= Hell on Wheels season 1 =

Hell on Wheels
- Season 1
- Region 1 Blu-ray cover art
- Showrunners: Joe Gayton; Tony Gayton
- No. of episodes: 10

Release
- Original network: AMC
- Original release: November 6, 2011 – January 15, 2012

Season chronology
- Next → Season 2

The first season of the AMC western-drama television series Hell on Wheels premiered on November 6, 2011 and concluded on January 15, 2012, comprising 10 episodes. The series was created and produced by Joe and Tony Gayton, who wrote four episodes. They also served as the series' showrunners. The series' executive producers include the Gaytons, Jeremy Gold, John Shiban, and David Von Ancken.

The season follows Cullen Bohannon, a former Confederate soldier who works as a foreman on the railroad as he tries to track down the Union soldiers who murdered his wife. His quest leads him to the settlement that accompanied the construction of First Transcontinental Railroad, referred to as "Hell on Wheels" by the Union Pacific company men, laborers, mercenaries, prostitutes, support workers, surveyors, and others who make the mobile encampment their home.

The first season was met with favorable reviews from critics, and the premiere was watched by 4.4 million viewers – AMC's second most watched series premiere in history, following The Walking Dead. In January 2012, following the season one finale, AMC put out a press release confirming Hell on Wheels as the network's second-highest rated original series behind The Walking Dead, averaging three million viewers per episode.

== Cast ==
=== Main cast ===
The first season has eight series regulars.

- Anson Mount as Cullen Bohannon, a former Confederate soldier who is determined to avenge the deaths of his son and his wife, Mary. (10 episodes)
- Colm Meaney as Thomas "Doc" Durant, a businessman and investor in the First Transcontinental Railroad, where he hopes to make his fortune. (10 episodes)
- Common as Elam Ferguson, a recently freed slave who is trying to find his place in the world. He works as security and general assistant to Bohannon. (10 episodes)
- Dominique McElligott as Lily Bell, a recent widow; her husband was a surveyor working on the transcontinental rail project. (10 episodes)
- Tom Noonan as Reverend Nathaniel Cole, a minister who formerly participated in Bleeding Kansas prior to the Civil War; he is sick of the slaughter and wants to help the whites and Indians avoid another war. (9 episodes)
- Eddie Spears as Joseph Black Moon, a Cheyenne who must choose between the new world and the traditions of his ancestors. (9 episodes)
- Ben Esler as Seán McGinnes, an ambitious young Irishman looking to make his fortune in the West. (7 episodes)
- Phil Burke as Mickey McGinnes, Seán's brother, who has travelled with Seán to America. (7 episodes)

=== Recurring cast ===
- Christopher Heyerdahl as Thor Gundersen, also known as "the Swede" (9 episodes)
- Robin McLeavy as Eva (8 episodes)
- Duncan Ollerenshaw as Mr. Gregory Toole (7 episodes)
- Diego Diablo Del Mar as Dix (7 episodes)
- Dohn Norwood as Psalms (6 episodes)
- James D. Hopkins as Senator Jordan Crane (6 episodes)
- Gerald Auger as Pawnee Killer (6 episodes)
- Kasha Kropinski as Ruth (5 episodes)
- April Telek as Nell (5 episodes)
- Ian Tracey as Bolan (5 episodes)
- James Dugan as Carl (3 episodes)
- Wes Studi as Chief Many Horses (3 episodes)
- Randy Birch as Deuce (3 episodes)
- Andrew Moodie as Henri (3 episodes)
- Robert Moloney as Robert Bell (2 episodes)
- Ian Kilburn as Frank Harper (2 episodes)
- Ty Olsson as Griggs (2 episodes)
- Tom Carey as Buckton Prescott (2 episodes)
- Jesse Lipscombe as William (1 episode)
- Ted Levine as Daniel Johnson (1 episode)

== Production ==
=== Conception ===
On November 8, 2011, co-creator Joe Gayton spoke of the series' origins. "We [Tony and I] started talking and remembered this story, American Experience, which was this really great documentary, and I thought, 'God, that's great. I just learned a bunch of stuff I had never learned before.' You just have this cursory information that the Chinese and the Irish built the railroad, but it got in underneath all the dirt and stuff that went on, with the financing of it, and the greed and corruption. And then, I heard about this Hell on Wheels place and I went, 'What a great setting for a western.' So, we pitched that to Jeremy Gold [at Endemol] and ended up taking it to AMC, and they loved it," he said.

Hell on Wheels was created by Joe and Tony Gayton in late 2008, and Endemol USA's scripted television division, headed by senior vice president of original programming Jeremy Gold, came on board to develop the series for AMC. On May 18, 2010, AMC placed a pilot order for Hell on Wheels with Endemol USA. Joe and Tony Gayton wrote the pilot, David Von Ancken was attached to the project as director, with Jeremy Gold, Joe Gayton and Tony Gayton serving as executive producers. On July 6, 2010, Endemol USA announced that they had entered into a partnership with Entertainment One, who would serve as the production studio on the project. Part of the deal between the two companies included provisions of international distribution, with Endemol retaining rights to the series across Europe, while Entertainment One acquired rights to Hell on Wheels in all remaining territories. As a result of the deal, Entertainment One also holds global rights for DVD and Blu-ray sales, as well as video-on-demand and other digital distribution services. The Canadian production company Nomadic Pictures was brought onto the project to serve as co-producers alongside Entertainment One. The pilot was delivered to AMC executives in November 2010. On November 12, 2010 it was reported by Deadline that the executives at AMC were impressed with the pilot, and, coupled with the fact that the network had just cancelled their drama series, Rubicon, were likely to order Hell on Wheels to series.

On December 15, 2010, AMC green-lighted the series with an order of 10 episodes. Along with the series pickup, AMC announced that Nomadic Pictures would again co-produce the series, as they had done for the pilot, with Mike Frislev and Chad Oakes joining the series as producers while John Shiban and David Von Ancken joined the series as executive producers; Von Ancken had previously served as director on the pilot. The network also announced that John Morayniss and Michael Rosenberg would oversee production for Entertainment One, while Joel Stillerman and Susie Fitzgerald would oversee production for AMC.

=== Filming ===
Filming of the first season took place in Calgary, as well as areas in central and southern Alberta, Canada. The T'suu T'ina Native Indian Reservation, an Indian reserve in southern Alberta, was the location for most of the exteriors.

== Episodes ==
No. overall	No. in season	Title	Directed by	Written by	Original release date	Prod. code	US viewers (millions)
1	1	"Hell on Wheels"	David Von Ancken	Tony Gayton & Joe Gayton	November 6, 2011	101	4.36
In 1865, former Confederate soldier Cullen Bohannon (Anson Mount) journeys to the Union Pacific Railroad's westward construction of the First Transcontinental Railroad to seek work and vengeance on the Union soldiers who killed his wife. Thomas "Doc" Durant (Colm Meaney) begins his "mad, noble quest" to expand his railroad westward. Lily Bell (Dominique McElligott), accompanies her ailing husband Robert (Robert Moloney) as he surveys the landscape for the Union Pacific. Their camp is attacked by Cheyenne braves and all are killed except Lily, who flees into the wilderness with maps that are essential to Durant's success. Reverend Nathaniel Cole (Tom Noonan) baptizes Joseph Black Moon (Eddie Spears), a Cheyenne, in the Missouri River. The two later arrive at Hell on Wheels, the name for the mobile camp that follows the railroad westward.
2	2	"Immoral Mathematics"	David Von Ancken	Tony Gayton & Joe Gayton	November 13, 2011	102	3.84
Cullen fights for his life as he answers to the Swede (Christopher Heyerdahl) for his deadly actions. Lily struggles to survive in the wilderness, as Durant attempts to spin tragedy for political gain. Durant offers a $100 ransom for saving Lily from the Indians, assuming and announcing that she was held captive by the attackers. Joseph tracks down the Cheyenne braves responsible for a massacre - one of whom is his own brother Pawnee Killer (Gerald Auger) - then he finds Lily and keeps her safe from the Indian warriors. Cullen escapes the captivity of the Swede and goes to Durant's office, where he asks for Johnson's job as the foreman. Durant gradually accepts, despite Cullen's having fought for the South during the Civil War.
3	3	"A New Birth of Freedom"	Phil Abraham	John Shiban	November 20, 2011	103	3.52
Cullen resumes his quest for vengeance by learning the name of one of the men responsible for his wife's death. His plans change when he crosses paths with Lily and Joseph. She has been wounded from a Cheyenne attack on her camp that also killed her husband. Joseph has been seeking answers from his former tribe, including his own brother, about the savage attack. When Bolan and his men try to forcibly escort Lily for the ransom, in the fire exchange Cullen shoots Bolan's ear, then he brings her near Hell On Wheels, but he lets her enter the camp alone, showing no interest for the ransom. Elam (Common) is approached by his fellow freeman about not doing his share of the work. Durant telegraphs Senator Crane (James D. Hopkin), appealing for federal troops to help with the natives. Crane wires back his dissent about the troop request, the pacing of the construction, and Robert Bell's murder.
4	4	"Jamais Je Ne T'oublierai"	Alex Zakrzewski	Jami O'Brien	November 27, 2011	104	3.28
Cullen searches for the man known only as "Harper", one of the men who murdered his wife, but he loses him after Harper shoots his horse. Lily arrives at Hell On Wheels to learn more about Durant, her deceased husband's employer, and his railroad, while she keeps him in the dark about saving the maps. Lily gives the ransom to Joseph, but he is reluctant to take it, eventually accepting it as a donation for the church. Elam finds solace in the arms of another social outcast, Eva (Robin McLeavy), a prostitute who had been marked by Indians with a facial tattoo during their captivity among them, which makes her a weird figure. The McGinnes brothers' show business, about city photos from Europe, does not go well. Cullen saves Bolan's life after a gunpowder explosion.
5	5	"Bread and Circuses"	Adam Davidson	Mark Richard	December 4, 2011	105	2.70
Rev. Cole's daughter Ruth (Kasha Kropinski) arrives in camp, but her father gives her a cold reception. Reverend Cole and Joseph travel into Cheyenne territory in hopes of a peace talk, while Joseph's brother endures a native ritual. Lily and Durant continue to discuss the future of the railroad construction as Durant deals with financial problems, such as, no payroll. Cullen and crewman Elam settle their differences in a public fight. Bets are made and Durant offers free whiskey, and the passions grow high. The McGinnes brothers win big, by using pepper to spice up the fight in their favor, for Elam's win. Ruth acknowledges the harsh reality of the camp. Lily reveals to Durant that she has the maps, but she wants something in exchange for them.
6	6	"Pride, Pomp and Circumstance"	Michael Slovis	Bruce Marshall Romans	December 11, 2011	106	2.15
Ruth makes herself useful in the church work with Joseph. Senator Crane arrives in town for an arranged peace talk with the Cheyenne and to discuss the Union Pacific Railroad's future with Durant. The Swede informs on Durant's financial doings to Senator Crane. Cullen is put in charge of security while the natives are in town. He prevents Lily from causing a scene, after she spots a female native wearing Lily's dead husband's hat. Cullen and the Swede prevent Mr. Toole and his gang from following the natives out of town and killing them. As a way of encouraging peace, Durant allows Pawnee Killer the chance to race a locomotive on horseback. The Cheyenne visitors leave without agreeing to peace. Lily gives the maps to Durant after seeing the Native Indian with her dead husband's hat, realizing that the Indian whom she killed with his own arrow during the fight in the massacre was her husband. Crane menaces to expose Durant's speculations and thus ruin him.
7	7	"Revelations"	Michelle MacLaren	Tony Gayton & Joe Gayton	December 18, 2011	107	2.27
Since Mr. Toole and his Irish gang can't attack the departing Cheyenne, they look for the "Heathen" whore Eva and find her in Elam's tent. Elam defends Eva so they grab him instead and intend to kill him for sport. Cullen interferes and helps him escape, and they both run away. The Swede persuades the men to pursue Bohannon. Bolan, in spite of Cullen having saved his life previously, volunteers to hunt him down. Alone in the wilderness, Elam and Cullen have a conversation and come to a mutual understanding, then Cullen teaches Elam how to shoot a gun. The Swede plants in Durant's head the idea that Lily fancies Durant. Durant and Lily travel by train to Chicago, for different reasons — he, to further discuss the railroad with Senator Crane; she, to meet with her deceased husband's family. Lily finds no comfort in her husband's family. Durant buys Crane's silence by giving him insight for further profitable investments in the railroad which later turn out to be false; Crane is ruined and Durant has him as a pawn. Durant proposes to Lily a stronger relationship. The posse hunting Elam and Cullen is ambushed by them in the woods but are killed.
8	8	"Derailed"	David Von Ancken	Mark Richard	January 1, 2012	108	2.51
Lily goes back with Durant on the railroad as a business partner, while he expects more. They come over a train derailed by the Cheyenne. Durant orders Cullen to lead a team to track them, thus openly disapproving the Swede's attitude in the previous events. While Ruth and Joseph grow closer, Rev. Cole seems to lose faith and seek vengeance, until he becomes ill, horrified by the deaths. Ruth confronts him for his drinking while she was a child. Lily moves out of Durant's coach and into her own tent beside the brothel, which allows her to become fast friends with Eva. Unhelped by a bitter Durant, she builds her home working with her hands. Elam and Joseph accompany Cullen and soldiers in chasing the Indian warriors. Tension mounts for Cullen's team in the pursuit of the renegade Indian tribe, more after they lose their horses and go on foot. The Swede comes up with info about Cullen's criminal acts, but Durant rebukes them, because he wants Cullen to fight his war. Durant does not give up on winning back Lily.
9	9	"Timshel"	John Shiban	John Shiban	January 8, 2012	109	2.29
Cullen and the search party, on foot after losing their horses, are attacked by the Cheyenne warriors, and the battle is fierce, but they win it, and Pawnee Killer is killed. Reverend Cole has recovered, but has difficulty reconciling with his daughter. The McGinnes brothers renew their business by showing nude photos of women. Lily retakes the topography work. Elam becomes a human asset to Durant. Toole shows up as miraculously having escaped death and he repents against Elam and Eva. Cullen refuses to kill the Swede for those who are spoiled by him. Joseph heavily regrets having helped in his brother's death, and Ruth comforts him affectionately. The railroad crew reaches the important 40-mile mark. During celebration, Durant warns Cullen that he is a wanted man for crimes in the past, while Reverend Cole suddenly kills an inquiring army officer.
10	10	"God of Chaos"	David Von Ancken	Tony Gayton & Joe Gayton	January 15, 2012	110	2.84
The Swede investigates Cullen's past, while Durant wants to remove Cullen. Lily gets some help from Cullen in building her house and they get closer somehow. After his crime, Reverend Cole becomes erratic. Elam distances himself from the other black workers. Elam and Eva each begin to see the future differently. Durant and Lily conspire to gain arriving investors' interests, after she pleads for Cullen to not let his vengeful path ruin him. Sean (Ben Esler) and Mickey McGinnes (Phil Burke) exact their own revenge on the Swede. Cullen tracks down the elusive Sergeant Harper and strangles him to death, but later he realizes that he killed the wrong man.

== Reception ==
=== Critical reception ===
Hell On Wheels' first season received "generally favorable" reviews from critics. Metacritic gave it a score of 63 out of 100 based on 27 reviews. The Washington Post's Hank Stuever rated the show highly, commenting, "Hands down, the most intriguing show on the fall slate. Though imbued with epic sweep, 'Hell on Wheels' is a western at heart, even if that heart is cold. Plenty of guns, knives, arrows, scalpings – mixed with the incendiary socio-psychological wounds left in the Civil War's wake." Robert Lloyd of the Los Angeles Times says the show "takes its cues more from the movies than from life ... Still, for all the unlikely things [the creators] make happen in order to get their characters into place, and the dogged refusal of a couple of those characters to become interesting at all, the show gathers steam as it goes on." The Wall Street Journal's Nancy Dewolf Smith considers the series "like a bag of unpolished stones ... Despite striking performances even in many of the smaller roles, the actors sometimes are made to symbolize very modern obsessions, e.g., with race and gender." Brian Lowry of Variety thinks "while the diverse mix of characters could work to the program's advantage over the long haul, jumping to and fro among them creates a diluted, herky-jerky ride in the early going."

=== Ratings ===
The pilot premiered on November 6. 2011. It was watched by 4.4 million viewers – AMC's second-highest series premiere in history, following The Walking Dead. Among key demographics, the pilot episode delivered 2.4 million viewers in adults 18–49. Among adults 25–54, it delivered 2.3 million viewers, according to Nielsen. The total viewership bested network slot rivals CSI: Miami or Pan Am. The sixth episode was watched by 2.15 million viewers, the lowest viewership of the first season and had a 0.6 rating with the 18-49 age range. The viewership numbers eventually rebounded with the season one finale being watched by 2.84 million viewers and maintained its steady 0.7 rating with the 18-49 age range. In January 2012, following the season one finale, AMC put out a press release confirming Hell on Wheels as the network's second-highest rated original series behind The Walking Dead, averaging three million viewers per episode.

== Home media release ==
=== DVD and Blu-ray sets ===
In May 2012, AMC released the first season of Hell on Wheels in DVD and Blu-ray Disc formats. Entitled "Hell on Wheels - The Complete 1st Season", the package includes three discs that contain all 10 episodes; extras such as "Recreating the Past: The Making of Hell on Wheels", "Crashing a Train: From Concept to Camera"; and episode, character, and making-of featurettes; as well as behind-the-scenes footage.

=== Soundtrack ===
In August 2012, the network released the soundtrack from the first season, featuring the Emmy-nominated theme song by Gustavo Santaolalla and music by Kevin Kiner. It is only available on iTunes for now.
