= Immoral Mathematics =

- Hell on Wheels episode
- The Swede (Christopher Heyerdahl) checks in on a prisoner.
- Episode no.: Season 1 Episode 2
- Directed by: David Von Ancken
- Written by: Tony Gayton; Joe Gayton
- Production code: 102
- Original air date: November 13, 2011

Guest appearances
- Christopher Heyerdahl as The Swede; Ian Tracey as Bolan; Diego Diablo del Mar as Dix; Dave Trimble as Durant's Man #1; Tefari Thompson as Freedman; Bruce Ramsay as Journalist; Dave Brown as Walking Boss; Kassia Warshawski as Mary Bohannon

Episode chronology
| ← Previous "Pilot" | Next → "A New Birth of Freedom" |

"Immoral Mathematics" is the second episode of the first season of the American television drama series Hell on Wheels; it aired November 13, 2011 on AMC, and was co-written by series co-creators Tony Gayton and Joe Gayton, and directed by David Von Ancken. Producers of this episode include: Tony Gayton, Joe Gayton, Jeremy Gold, John Shiban, and David Von Ancken.

The episode centers on Cullen Bohannon (Anson Mount) fighting for his life as he answers for Johnson's death. Meanwhile, Lily Bell (Dominique McElligott) struggles to survive in the wilderness, Thomas Durant (Colm Meaney) attempts to spin tragedy for political gain, and Joseph Black Moon (Eddie Spears) tracks down the Cheyenne braves responsible for a massacre only to find one of them is his own brother (Gerald Auger).

== Plot ==
Durant (Colm Meaney) arrives at Robert Bell's camp after the massacre and discovers Bell's body and that of his attacker, in the woods, along with a pocket watch containing a picture of Lily (Dominique McElligott) inside. The survey maps are nowhere to be found.

Cullen Bohannon (Anson Mount) gets introduced to a man known as "The Swede", Durant's head of security at Hell on Wheels. The Swede (Christopher Heyerdahl) questions Bohannon about Johnson's murder. Bohannon declines to implicate anyone on his crew, thus taking the fall for the crime. The Swede has Bohannon chained up inside a freight car, where Bohannon sees a loose floorboard nail and tries to pry it out. While doing so, Bohannon thinks back to Meridian and his wife Mary (Kassia Warshawski) stitching needlepoint.

Joseph Black Moon (Eddie Spears) finds the Cheyenne braves responsible for the massacre - one of which is his brother, Pawnee Killer (Gerald Auger). Joseph warns Pawnee Killer that his band will be hunted if they capture the white woman (Lily). Pawnee Killer doesn't care and reminds Joseph that he, too, once enjoyed killing and scalping whites. Joseph later finds an ailing Lily cowering from the nearby braves and helps her evade his brother's group.

The next morning, The Swede tauntingly eats breakfast in front of Bohannon while describing his past experiences. He was a former bookkeeper, then an Army quartermaster, when taken by Confederates as a prisoner of war. Starving, and set upon by another starving POW who sought to cannibalize him, The Swede began using "immoral mathematics" to control people.

Bohannon kicks The Swede's meal to the floor, and The Swede leaves without recovering his utensils. Bohannon uses the spoon to pry up nails in the car's floorboard, and escapes through the hole. Reverend Cole (Tom Noonan) aids Bohannon in eluding The Swede, then instructs Bohannon to beg God's forgiveness before he is caught. Bohannon refuses, stating he does not deserve forgiveness, and leaves. Elam (Common) later hammers the chain free from Bohannon's wrists.

Out on the prairie, The Swede finds Durant's caravan. Durant asks him to offer a $100 reward for Lily's return, adding his orders to not say a word about the missing maps.

Durant, upon entering his Pullman coach, is greeted by Bohannon, who boldly requests Johnson's job. Comparing railroad building to the Civil War, Bohannon boasts of his having motivating outnumbered, undersupplied troops to win battles, then stresses Durant's current predicament: the government funding doesn't take effect until Durant lays 40 miles of track. Bohannon also mentions Durant's war profiteering, and ends up getting the job.

The Swede sees Bohannon leaving the Pullman and draws his gun. However, Durant orders him to stand down, proclaiming Bohannon as his new foreman. When Bohannon goes into Johnson's former headquarters, he finds in his jacket a stitching that belonged to his deceased wife and ponders getting revenge on the last man that killed her.

== Set location ==
The T'suu T'ina Native Indian Reservation, an Indian reserve in southern Alberta, was the location for most of the exteriors.

== Reception ==
"Immoral Mathematics" received mixed reviews. Adam Raymond of New York Magazine stated the episode "spent the majority swinging more hammers in an attempt to get to a place that’ll allow this train to finally get out of the station." IGN rated the show 6 out of 10 on their website. Seth Amitin said, "it looks like Hell on Wheels still isn't sure what it's going to be. The Swede is an extraordinary addition to the series, though, and hopefully the series continues to build and progress as it goes on." TV Fanatic's Sean McKenna approved of the episode: "Thankfully, 'Immoral Mathematics' managed to focus itself on one central storyline and scatter a few smaller ones throughout. It chugged along at a much quicker pace and kept me interested for pretty much the entire episode."

Compared to the previous pilot episode, the second episode dropped in viewership to 3.84 million viewers but still did strong in 18-49 age range with 1.5 rating.
