= Derailed (Hell on Wheels) =

- Hell on Wheels episode
- Episode no.: Season 1 Episode 8
- Directed by: David Von Ancken
- Written by: Mark Richard
- Production code: 108
- Original air date: January 1, 2012

Guest appearances
- Gerald Auger as Pawnee Killer; Christopher Heyerdahl as The Swede; Robin McLeavy as Eva; Ty Olsson as Griggs; Kasha Kropinski as Ruth

Episode chronology
← Previous "Revelations"	Next → "Timshel"

"Derailed" is the eighth episode of the first season of the American television drama series Hell On Wheels, which aired on January 1, 2012 on AMC. It is written by Mark Richard, and directed by David Von Ancken. In the episode, a train is derailed by the Cheyenne and Durant (Colm Meaney) orders Cullen (Anson Mount) to lead a team to track them; Lily (Dominique McElligott) moves out of Durant's coach and into her own tent beside the brothel, which allows her to become fast friends with Eva (Robin McLeavy); and tension mounts for Cullen's team in the pursuit of the renegade Indian tribe.

== Plot ==
Durant and Lily's train returns from Chicago, only to stop for a derailment ahead of it. Lily attends to the wounded, while Durant surveys the train damage. The Swede (Christopher Heyerdahl) arrives and Durant orders him to have Cullen lead a team to respond to the attack. The Swede tells him that Cullen and Elam are considered wanted after the hanging incident. Durant scoffs at the idea of The Swede's vengeance. Moments later, Cullen and Elam (Common) arrive at the scene on horseback. The Swede and Cullen both pull guns, with Cullen the faster draw. The Swede kneels, pleading for mercy. Cullen smacks The Swede's face with his gun, then whips him with a leather strap until Lily and Durant intervene. In his coach car, Durant orders Cullen and Lieutenant Griggs (Ty Olsson), the lead U.S. cavalry officer, to track down the Cheyenne attackers. Griggs does not want to team up with an ex-Confederate but Durant threatens to contact his commanding general. Joseph (Eddie Spears) will accompany the mission to lead them to the Cheyenne camp and negotiate with Chief Many Horses. Alone with Cullen, Durant calls Griggs a hothead. They can't risk him starting a war, but the attacks must cease. He tells Cullen to kill the renegade Indians.

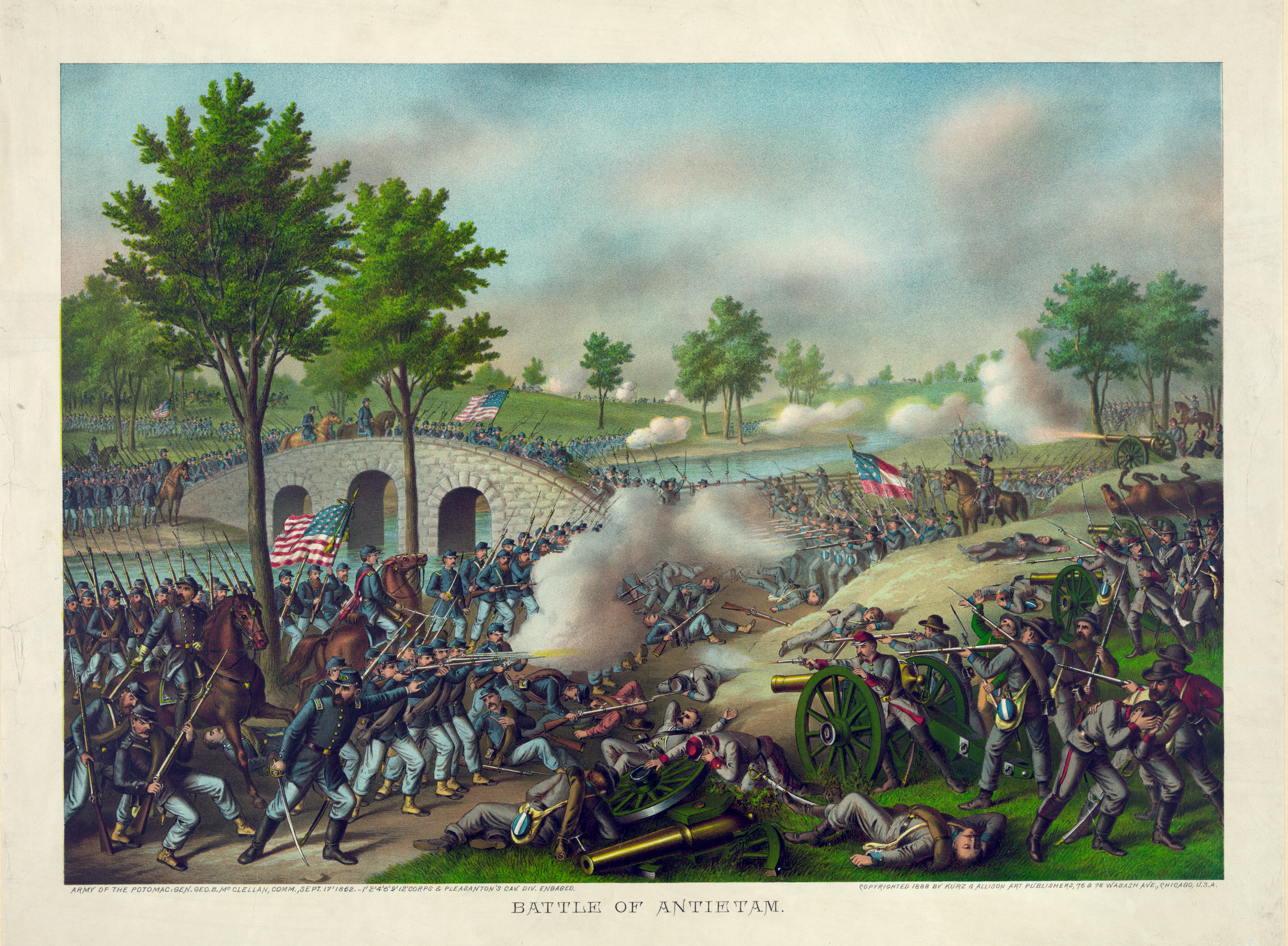
The Battle of Antietam, by Kurz & Allison, depicting the scene of action at Burnside's Bridge, which is the battle discussed in the episode.

Outside the cathouse, Cullen asks Elam to join the Indian pursuit. Cullen doesn't trust the Union soldiers to not take revenge on a Confederate. Joseph, Elam, and Cullen meet up with Griggs, who sneers that his eight-man contingent now includes the three men. In Cheyenne country, Joseph tells Griggs that Chief Many Horses will know where Pawnee Killer is. Alone with Joseph, Elam questions the Griggs's pledge not to harm the Indian women and children. Cullen notices the Confederate sabre on Griggs's belt. "Spoils of victory" from the Battle of Antietam, boasts Griggs. Around the campfire, Griggs jokingly describes the Confederate retreat at Antietam. It only happened, says Cullen, because his side ran out of ammunition after killing so many from the other side. "We won, and you lost," taunts Griggs, holding up the sword to prove it. Cullen moves to forcefully take the sword from Griggs, but Elam restrains him. The next morning, the men awake to a Union soldier's screams and discover him hanging, mutilated, from a nearby tree. Griggs blames the incident on Chief Many Horses, but Joseph says it's the work of Pawnee Killer.

After witnessing the carnage from the train being attacked, Reverend Cole has a breakdown and knows now that peace between the Cheyenne and the Railroad cannot exist. After Joseph leaves, Ruth confronts Reverend Cole in his tent reminding him about his past alcoholism and how he used to brutally beat her mother in his drunken fits. When Reverend Cole gets up to hit her, he is able to stop himself. Ruth coldly tells him that she is not her mother and she is not afraid of him.

Back at Hell on Wheels, after previously being asked by Cullen if she was a "kept woman," Lily informs Durant that she's moving out of his train car and into the encampment, using the tent she and Robert shared. He accuses her of playing him "like a fiddle" and denies her request for help in removing her belongings. Two men set up Lily's tent near the brothel. Eva appears and tells Lily to hire a carpenter to lay floorboards to avoid getting trench foot. At the outdoor mess kitchen, Eva reveals to Lily that Indians killed her family but spared her because she had smallpox. After she recovered, they sold her to another tribe. Lily describes her nightmares about the Indian she killed. His spirit wants to drag Lily into the dead world, Eva explains, and that Lily has invited "big magic." In her tent, Lily struggles in the mud to install floorboards. Outside, Durant calls to her. When she doesn't respond, he ties Robert's pocket watch to her tent.

While the men are in the woods, the Cheyenne steal their horses. Cullen suggests returning to Hell on Wheels, but Griggs insists on marching toward the Indian village anyway. Cullen tells Elam that if the villagers don't escape before Griggs arrives, there will likely be bloodshed and the two of them may have to battle the Union soldiers. Cullen realizes that Joseph is misdirecting the group to buy time so the Cheyenne villagers can escape. Joseph admits it's true but vows that once his family is safe he'll track down Pawnee Killer. After hearing an Indian call, two soldiers begin firing, but Cullen warns them to stop. Griggs's party comes upon a recently evacuated Indian encampment. Griggs accuses Joseph of plotting with his brother. A young brave appears, and Griggs shoots him dead. As Cullen, Elam, and Joseph aim weapons at Griggs, an arrow pierces his shoulder, and a large Cheyenne war party, led by Pawnee Killer (Gerald Auger), begins to attack.

== Reception ==
TV Fanatic's Sean McKenna rated the episode with 3 out of 5 stars, saying "Hell On Wheels has created a cast of entertaining characters and while 'Revelations' continued to lay out the groundwork for their developing backgrounds, it seems as if the show isn't entirely sure what to do with them." Phil Nugent of The A.V. Club gave the episode an F, stating, "The characters on Hell On Wheels who you're meant to hate don't last long, and the ones you're meant to like don't stay down for long, either. The ones you might be meant to have mixed-to-indifferent feelings about are few and far between."

The eighth episode was watched by 2.51 million viewers, and had a 0.7 rating with the 18-49 age range — gaining more viewers and a higher rating than the previous episode.
