= List of Hell on Wheels episodes =

Hell on Wheels is an American dramatic television series created and produced by Joe and Tony Gayton. The series was broadcast in the United States and Canada on the cable channel AMC and premiered on November 6, 2011. Set in the 1860s at the end of the United States Civil War, the series starred Anson Mount as Cullen Bohannon, a former Confederate soldier determined to exact revenge on the Union soldiers who murdered his wife. His quest for vengeance sent him westward to Nebraska's "Hell on Wheels", the lawless town that moved with the construction of the first transcontinental railroad. However, things got complicated when Cheyenne and Sioux tribes attack the construction of the railroad, bent on destroying the project because it is being built through their lands.

On November 7, 2014, AMC renewed the series for a fifth and final season of fourteen episodes. The final season was split into two parts, with seven episodes airing in the summers of 2015 and 2016 respectively. The fifth season premiered on July 18, 2015. The second half began on June 11, 2016, and the series ended July 23, 2016.

During the course of the series, 57 episodes of Hell on Wheels aired, between November 6, 2011, and July 23, 2016.

== Series overview ==
Season	Episodes		Originally released	
Season	Episodes		First released	Last released
1	10		November 6, 2011	January 15, 2012
2	10		August 12, 2012	October 7, 2012
3	10		August 10, 2013	October 5, 2013
4	13		August 2, 2014	November 22, 2014
5	14	7	July 18, 2015	August 29, 2015
5	14	7	June 11, 2016	July 23, 2016

== Episodes ==
=== Season 1 (2011–12) ===
No. overall	No. in season	Title	Directed by	Written by	Original release date	Prod. code	US viewers (millions)
1	1	"Hell on Wheels"	David Von Ancken	Tony Gayton & Joe Gayton	November 6, 2011	101	4.36
2	2	"Immoral Mathematics"	David Von Ancken	Tony Gayton & Joe Gayton	November 13, 2011	102	3.84
3	3	"A New Birth of Freedom"	Phil Abraham	John Shiban	November 20, 2011	103	3.52
4	4	"Jamais Je Ne T'oublierai"	Alex Zakrzewski	Jami O'Brien	November 27, 2011	104	3.28
5	5	"Bread and Circuses"	Adam Davidson	Mark Richard	December 4, 2011	105	2.70
6	6	"Pride, Pomp and Circumstance"	Michael Slovis	Bruce Marshall Romans	December 11, 2011	106	2.15
7	7	"Revelations"	Michelle MacLaren	Tony Gayton & Joe Gayton	December 18, 2011	107	2.27
8	8	"Derailed"	David Von Ancken	Mark Richard	January 1, 2012	108	2.51
9	9	"Timshel"	John Shiban	John Shiban	January 8, 2012	109	2.29
10	10	"God of Chaos"	David Von Ancken	Tony Gayton & Joe Gayton	January 15, 2012	110	2.84

=== Season 2 (2012) ===
No. overall	No. in season	Title	Directed by	Written by	Original release date	Prod. code	US viewers (millions)
11	1	"Viva la Mexico"	David Von Ancken	Tony Gayton & Joe Gayton	August 12, 2012	201	2.45
12	2	"Durant, Nebraska"	Adam Davidson	John Shiban	August 19, 2012	202	2.31
13	3	"Slaughterhouse"	Sergio Mimica-Gezzan	Jami O'Brien & Bruce Marshall Romans	August 26, 2012	203	2.50
14	4	"Scabs"	Catherine Hardwicke	Chris Mundy	September 2, 2012	204	2.47
15	5	"The Railroad Job"	Michael Nankin	Mark Richard	September 9, 2012	205	2.62
16	6	"Purged Away with Blood"	Joe Gayton	Tony Gayton & Tom Brady	September 16, 2012	206	2.70
17	7	"The White Spirit"	David Von Ancken	Jami O'Brien & Bruce Marshall Romans	September 23, 2012	207	2.32
18	8	"The Lord's Day"	Rod Lurie	Mark Richard & Chris Mundy	September 30, 2012	208	1.83
19	9	"Blood Moon"	Terry McDonough	Mark Richard & Jami O'Brien	October 7, 2012	209	2.18
20	10	"Blood Moon Rising"	John Shiban	John Shiban	October 7, 2012	210	2.18

=== Season 3 (2013) ===
No. overall	No. in season	Title	Directed by	Written by	Original release date	Prod. code	US viewers (millions)
21	1	"Big Bad Wolf"	David Von Ancken	Mark Richard	August 10, 2013	301	2.49
22	2	"Eminent Domain"	Adam Davidson	John Wirth	August 10, 2013	302	2.49
23	3	"Range War"	Dennie Gordon	Mark Richard & Reed Steiner	August 17, 2013	303	1.88
24	4	"The Game"	Adam Davidson	Jami O'Brien	August 24, 2013	304	2.00
25	5	"Searchers"	Neil LaBute	Bruce Marshall Romans	August 31, 2013	305	2.20
26	6	"One Less Mule"	David Straiton & Deran Sarafian	John Wirth & Lolis Eric Elie	September 7, 2013	306	2.07
27	7	"Cholera"	Deran Sarafian	Tom Brady	September 14, 2013	307	1.99
28	8	"It Happened in Boston"	Rosemary Rodriguez	Mark Richard	September 21, 2013	308	2.08
29	9	"Fathers and Sins"	Billy Gierhart	John Wirth & Reed Steiner	September 28, 2013	309	2.10
30	10	"Get Behind the Mule"	Neil LaBute	Mark Richard & Jami O'Brien	October 5, 2013	310	2.49

=== Season 4 (2014) ===
No. overall	No. in season	Title	Directed by	Written by	Original release date	Prod. code	US viewers (millions)
31	1	"The Elusive Eden"	Neil LaBute	Mark Richard	August 2, 2014	401	2.42
32	2	"Escape From the Garden"	Neil LaBute	Mark Richard	August 9, 2014	402	1.98
33	3	"Chicken Hill"	Dennie Gordon	John Wirth	August 16, 2014	403	2.17
34	4	"Reckoning"	Dennie Gordon	Jennifer Cecil	August 23, 2014	404	2.08
35	5	"Life's a Mystery"	David Straiton	Mark Richard & Tom Brady	August 30, 2014	405	1.78
36	6	"Bear Man"	Clark Johnson	Max Hurwitz	September 6, 2014	406	2.15
37	7	"Elam Ferguson"	Rod Lurie	Mark Richard & Tom Brady	September 13, 2014	407	2.18
38	8	"Under Color of Law"	Michael Nankin	John Romano	September 20, 2014	408	2.02
39	9	"Two Trains"	Marvin V. Rush	Bruce Marshall Romans	September 27, 2014	409	2.30
40	10	"Return to Hell"	Billy Gierhart	Jami O'Brien	October 4, 2014	410	2.26
41	11	"Bleeding Kansas"	Seith Mann	Michael C. Martin & Jimmy Mero	November 8, 2014	411	1.89
42	12	"Thirteen Steps"	Roxann Dawson	Tom Brady	November 15, 2014	412	1.74
43	13	"Further West"	Adam Davidson	John Wirth & John Romano	November 22, 2014	413	2.17

=== Season 5 (2015–16) ===
No. overall	No. in season	Title	Directed by	Written by	Original release date	Prod. code	US viewers (millions)
Part 1
44	1	"Chinatown"	David Straiton	Jami O'Brien	July 18, 2015	501	2.07
45	2	"Mei Mei"	Billy Gierhart	John Wirth & Thomas Brady	July 25, 2015	502	1.55
46	3	"White Justice"	David Straiton	John Romano	August 1, 2015	503	1.67
47	4	"Struck"	Clark Johnson	Max Hurwitz	August 8, 2015	504	2.00
48	5	"Elixir of Life"	Karen Gaviola	Michael Saltzman	August 15, 2015	505	1.90
49	6	"Hungry Ghosts"	Neil LaBute	Jami O'Brien & Miki Johnson	August 22, 2015	506	1.59
50	7	"False Prophets"	Rod Lurie	John Romano & Thomas Brady	August 29, 2015	507	1.85
Part 2
51	8	"Two Soldiers"	Michael Nankin	John Wirth & Thomas Brady	June 11, 2016	508	1.78
52	9	"Return to the Garden"	Marvin V. Rush	Jami O'Brien	June 18, 2016	509	1.49
53	10	"61 Degrees"	Michael Nankin	Max Hurwitz	June 25, 2016	510	1.51
54	11	"Gambit"	Adam Davidson	John Romano & Miki Johnson	July 2, 2016	511	1.43
55	12	"Any Sum Within Reason"	Tim Southam	Thomas Brady	July 9, 2016	512	1.72
56	13	"Railroad Men"	Jeremy Webb	John Wirth & Thomas Brady	July 16, 2016	513	1.60
57	14	"Done"	David Von Ancken	Jami O'Brien & Thomas Brady	July 23, 2016	514	1.65

== Ratings ==
Hell on Wheels : U.S. viewers per episode (millions)

Season	Episode number												
Season	1	2	3	4	5	6	7	8	9	10	11	12	13
1	4.36	3.84	3.52	3.28	2.70	2.15	2.27	2.51	2.29	2.84	–		
2	2.45	2.31	2.50	2.47	2.62	2.70	2.32	1.83	2.18	2.18	–		
3	2.49	2.49	1.88	2.00	2.20	2.07	1.99	2.08	2.10	2.49	–		
4	2.42	1.98	2.17	2.08	1.78	2.15	2.18	2.02	2.30	2.26	1.89	1.74	2.17
5A	2.07	1.55	1.67	2.00	1.90	1.59	1.85	–					
5B	1.78	1.49	1.51	1.43	1.72	1.60	1.65	–					

Audience measurement performed by Nielsen Media Research
