= Bread and Circuses (Hell on Wheels) =

- Hell on Wheels episode
- Episode no.: Season 1 Episode 5
- Directed by: Adam Davidson
- Written by: Mark Richard
- Production code: 105
- Original air date: December 4, 2011

Guest appearances
- Christopher Heyerdahl as The Swede; Wes Studi as Chief Many Horses; Gerald Auger as Pawnee Killer; Kasha Kropinski as Ruth; Robin McLeavy as Eva; Dohn Norwood as Psalms

Episode chronology
← Previous "Jamais Je Ne T'oublierai"	Next → "Pride, Pomp and Circumstance"

"Bread and Circuses" is the fifth episode of the first season of the American television drama series Hell on Wheels; it aired December 4, 2011 on AMC, and was written by Mark Richard and directed by Adam Davidson. Its title is a reference to the phrase "bread and circuses" taken from Juvenal's poem, "Satire X". In the episode, Joseph Black Moon and Reverend Nathaniel Cole travel into Cheyenne territory in hopes of a peace talk, Joseph's brother endures a native ritual, Lily Bell and Thomas Durant continue to discuss the future of the railroad construction, and Cullen Bohannon and his crewman Elam Ferguson settle their differences in a public fight.

== Plot ==
In Cheyenne territory, Chief Many Horses (Wes Studi) prepares Pawnee Killer (Gerald Auger) for the Sun Dance ceremony. With long leather straps attached from his chest to a lone tree, Pawnee Killer must spend a full day staring at the sun and praying. If successful, a vision will be granted him. Pawnee Killer collapses after completing the ceremony, telling Chief Many Horses that he was blessed with a vision of the "great steel beast", adding "I killed it". Reverend Cole (Tom Noonan) and Joseph (Eddie Spears) visit Chief Many Horses to ask him to come to Hell on Wheels and discuss peace. The chief will agree only if Joseph requests his presence, which Joseph does. Later, Reverend Cole's daughter, Ruth Cole (Kasha Kropinski), arrives in Hell on Wheels and informs him that her mother has died. Reverend Cole appears dismissive of his daughter and wishes to send her away, but must keep her in town as Ruth has nowhere else to go. Reverend Cole reveals that he has not seen Ruth in the last decade and there appears to be unresolved issues between the two.

Back in town, Thomas Durant (Colm Meaney) emerges from his Pullman coach. Cullen Bohannon (Anson Mount) informs him that the workers are unhappy about not having been paid, lately. Durant orders him to only pay the walking bosses to keep the rest of the workers quiet. Later at the work site, Cullen convenes with the walking bosses to inform them of the pay situation. Elam (Common) joins the group to declare himself a walking boss of the freedmen. When thwarted, he gets upset with the situation and walks off the job, daring Cullen to make him work. A fight breaks out between them. Durant orders them to stop, announcing to the whole crew that the payroll is on its way. He proposes to Cullen and Elam that they settle their differences in a public fight that evening. Durant, meanwhile, tells Lily (Dominique McElligott) that, without her deceased husband Robert's survey maps, he will be considered a failure, and Robert won't be thought of at all. She later accuses Durant of engineering the fight to distract his workers until they can be paid. He scoffs at her opinion of him. She then decides to tell him that she has Robert's maps, which detail the route through the Rocky Mountains and beyond. Durant is excited at the news, until she declines to reveal the maps' location. "How much?" he asks. "What Robert is owed", she replies.

Sean (Ben Esler) and Mickey (Phil Burke) McGinness' magic-lantern business has money trouble as well, with The Swede (Christopher Heyerdahl). He cuts their tent's rope supports, collapsing their place of business.

Before the arranged fight, Sean is sold "enough peppers to make a Mexican cry". Mickey helps Cullen prepare for the fight and tells him Sean has bet all their money on him. The fight begins and, at first, Cullen gets the best of Elam. However, between rounds, Psalms (Dohn Norwood) motivates Elam, comparing Cullen to a former slave master who mistreated Elam. Elam then beats Cullen down to the floor. As Mickey tries to raise Cullen, he notices Sean whisper to Psalms and slip something to him. The fight resumes. Elam lands a punch to Cullen's eyes. This staggers his opponent, blurring his vision. Elam eventually wins the fight.

Outside, Sean shows Mickey a sizable wad of money. Seeing his brother's confusion, he explains that he bet everything on Elam, not Cullen. Mickey says Sean cheated, and Cullen was their only friend. Sean disagrees; money is his only friend.

In the saloon, Lily sets a bucket of water at Cullen's head. He washes his eyes, then licks the residue from his fingers. He laughs at the peppery taste.

The next morning, in his tent, Cullen hands out payment bags to the walking bosses. Elam enters and again identifies himself as the freedmen crew's walking boss. Cullen offers Elam his money bag, but still clutches it when Elam tries to take it. He finally releases it to him, after they stare at each other.

== Title reference ==
The term "bread and circuses" is a metaphor for a superficial means of appeasement. The Roman satirist and poet Juvenal wrote the phrase in Satire X (circa 100 AD), wherein Roman politicians devise a plan, in 140 BC, to effectively win the votes of their new citizens and rise to power, by providing cheap food and entertainment, i.e., "bread and circuses".

[...] iam pridem, ex quo suffragia nulli / uendimus, effudit curas; nam qui dabat olim / imperium, fasces, legiones, omnia, nunc se / continet atque duas tantum res anxius optat, / panem et circenses. [...]

(Juvenal, Satire 10.77–81)

... Already long ago, from when we sold our vote to no man, the People have abdicated our duties; for the People who once upon a time handed out military command, high civil office, legions — everything, now restrains itself and anxiously hopes for just two things: bread and circuses.

== Reception ==
Reviews for the episode were mixed. Adam Raymond of New York Magazine commented: "'Bread and Circuses' was all half-naked Common and half-naked Anson Mount working through hundreds of years of slavery with their fists." IGN's Seth Amitin rated the episode as 6.5/10, calling it "a passable episode. It helped establish more character base and had some beautiful shots in there too ... The characters are there and that'll matter more over a full series. Sean McKenna of TV Fanatic gave the episode 4 out of 5 stars: "I'm growing more and more attached to these characters as Hell on Wheels moves along, with the combination of action and drama keeping the show from turning into a history lesson snooze fest."

The fifth episode was watched by 2.7 million viewers and had a 0.8 rating with the 18-49 age range.
