= Hell on Wheels (Hell on Wheels episode) =

- Hell on Wheels episode
- Cullen Bohannon (Anson Mount) begins his vengeful search.
- Episode no.: Season 1 Episode 1
- Directed by: David Von Ancken
- Written by: Tony Gayton; Joe Gayton
- Editing by: Skip Macdonald
- Production code: 101
- Original air date: November 6, 2011

Guest appearances
- James D. Hopkin as Senator Jordan Crane; Ted Levine as Daniel Johnson; Robert Moloney as Robert Bell; Tom Carey as the Union soldier

Episode chronology
← Previous —	Next → "Immoral Mathematics"

"Hell on Wheels" or "Pilot" is the pilot and first episode of the first season of American television drama series of the same name, which premiered November 6, 2011, on AMC in the United States and on TCM in the UK. The episode was written by creators Tony Gayton and Joe Gayton, and directed by David Von Ancken. The pilot introduces the series' protagonist, Cullen Bohannon (Anson Mount), a former Confederate soldier whose quest for vengeance has led him to the Union Pacific Railroad's westward construction of the first transcontinental railroad.

The pilot episode was filmed entirely in Alberta, Canada, with assistance from the provincial government of Alberta's film-development program. "Hell on Wheels" garnered a 3.1 HH rating, attracting 4.4 million viewers (2.4 million, aged 18–49; 2.3 million, aged 25–54) to become the second highest series premiere in AMC’s history. Critical reception of the pilot was mediocre. The Los Angeles Times said the show "gathers steam as it goes on," The Wall Street Journal called it "a bag of unpolished stones," and Variety pegged it as "a diluted, herky-jerky ride."

== Plot ==
The series opens in the year 1865, shortly after the assassination of Abraham Lincoln. A young Union soldier (Tom Carey) enters a church in Washington, D.C. to confess his sins. Shortly after he begins, the priest asks the soldier about Meridian. The soldier, confused, asks the priest how he knows about Meridian and is then shot dead by the priest, who exits the confessional to reveal that he is not a priest, but Cullen Bohannon (Anson Mount), a former Confederate soldier.

Meanwhile, Thomas "Doc" Durant gives an inspiring speech about building the Transcontinental Railroad to a group of prominent Americans, including Senator Jordan Crane (James D. Hopkin). Afterward, Durant reveals to Crane that, through the use of Durant's company, Crédit Mobilier, Durant will essentially pay himself to build the railroad with government subsidies. Durant bribes Crane with shares in Crédit Mobilier to secure his assistance in this endeavor, ensuring Crane's support by threatening to route his railroad to exclude the Nebraska lands Crane owns, which would significantly lower their value.

Arriving at the Hell on Wheels encampment, Bohannon seeks work from Foreman Daniel Johnson (Ted Levine), and though Bohannon has no experience in railroad work, Johnson hires him as a "walking boss" after learning Bohannon had owned slaves before the Civil War. Johnson introduces Bohannon to the "cut crew" - the men who dig the trail for the rails to be laid in - which is predominantly black.

In a nearby river, the idealistic Reverend Cole (Tom Noonan) baptizes a young Native American, Joseph Black Moon (Eddie Spears). Afterward, the two ride into the Hell on Wheels camp, to set up their church.

Deep in the Nebraska Territory, surveyor Robert Bell (Robert Moloney) plots the railroad's path, with a small surveying team that includes his wife, Lily (Dominique McElligott). Robert urges Lily to return to Chicago, as they are entering hostile Cheyenne territory, but he is ill, and she refuses to leave him. The following day, they are attacked by a small group of Cheyenne, which slaughters all the surveyors (most of whom are unarmed) except Robert and Lily, who manage to escape. However, they are caught by one of the Native American braves, who kills Robert and wounds Lily. She kills the brave, in self-defense, and takes Robert's maps, which show the route through the Rocky Mountains discovered by the team, and flees into the woods. On his way to Hell on Wheels, Durant learns of Bell's death, which greatly complicates things.

While digging the cut, Willie, one of Bohannon's workers, almost collapses because of the heat. Elam Ferguson (Common) aids him to get drinking water, but before they can return to the cut, Johnson arrives on horseback. A nearby explosion startles the horse, which kicks Willie twice, killing him. Although the death was unintentional, Johnson tells his workers, "This is what happens when you break my rules."

After the day's work is finished, Bohannon visits Elam's tent. He finds Elam sharpening a knife, intent on killing Johnson to avenge Willie's death. Bohannon tries to talk him out of it and later joins Johnson for a drink.

After they discuss the war, Bohannon asks Johnson if he has ever been to Meridian. Johnson responds by taking Bohannon hostage. Johnson tells Bohannon that he read of the Union soldier killed in Washington, DC by a Griswold revolver, and seeing Bohannon's Griswold when he hired him, coupled with Bohannon's mention of Meridian, confirmed his suspicions.

Johnson lets slip that Bohannon's wife was murdered; she did not commit suicide as the widower had thought. Rather, Johnson claims "the sergeant" strangled Bohannon's wife and hung her to cover up the murder, but Johnson refuses to grant Bohannon's request to name the sergeant. Elam appears and slits Johnson's throat, saving Bohannon but killing his chances learning the sergeant's identity.

== Filming, cinematography, and environmentalism ==
"Much like each and every film we produce, it is imperative that when we shoot on a pristine, untouched tract of land, that we leave it in better shape than when we found it before we set foot on that land. For example, the site chosen on T'suu T'ina Native Indian Reservation for the actual tent town site of 'Hell on Wheels' was put back (seeded) into prairie grass, to ensure we left no scarred earth, tire marks or foot print behind." — "Hell On Wheels" producer Chad Oakes.

Filming of the pilot took place between August 2010 and September 2010 on location in Calgary as well as in central and southern Alberta, Canada. The T'suu T'ina Native Indian Reservation, an Indian reserve in southern Alberta, was the location for most of the exteriors. The entire production team was mandated to preserve the environment in its wild state. They were also doing their part to protect the environment. "We were one of the first Canadian production companies to use the new Scenecronize System, which digitally distributes scripts and all production paperwork to the crew, network, studio and talent, cutting our photocopy usage down by 500,000 copies on the first season alone," producer Chad Oakes points out, adding that, after realizing that the crew consumed more than 25,000 bottles of water in the first half of the season, "We implemented water coolers and 'bring your own bottle to set' policy to cut down on our plastic bottle consumption."

== Reception ==
=== Critical reception ===
The show was rated 63 out of 100 on Metacritic, based on 27 reviews, indicating mixed reviews.

The Washington Post's Hank Stuever rated the show highly, commenting, "Hands down, the most intriguing show on the fall slate. Though imbued with epic sweep, 'Hell on Wheels' is a western at heart, even if that heart is cold. Plenty of guns, knives, arrows, scalpings — mixed with the incendiary socio-psychological wounds left in the Civil War’s wake."

Robert Lloyd of the Los Angeles Times says the show "takes its cues more from the movies than from life. Never, in the episodes I watched, did I feel as if I were actually seeing how a railroad got built, and sometimes it took a bit of squinting not to see the characters as actors in a field, reading lines. Still, for all the unlikely things [the creators] make happen in order to get their characters into place, and the dogged refusal of a couple of those characters to become interesting at all, the show gathers steam as it goes on."

Wall Street Journal's Nancy Dewolf Smith considers the episode "like a bag of unpolished stones... 'Hell on Wheels' finds enough beauty, danger and emotion to make some part of every episode seem fresh and worth waiting for. Not that new is always a good thing. Despite striking performances even in many of the smaller roles, the actors sometimes are made to symbolize very modern obsessions, e.g., with race and gender. The sight of modern sensibilities lurking behind the curtains can break ye olde spell."

Brian Lowry of Variety thinks: "while the diverse mix of characters could work to the program's advantage over the long haul, jumping to and fro among them creates a diluted, herky-jerky ride in the early going."

=== Viewership ===
The pilot premiered on November 6, 2011. It was watched by 4.4 million viewers - AMC's second-highest series premiere in history, following The Walking Dead. Among key demographics, the pilot episode delivered 2.4 million viewers in adults aged 18–49 and 2.3 million viewers aged 25–54, according to Nielsen. The total viewership bested network slot rivals CSI: Miami and Pan Am.
