= Jamais Je Ne T'oublierai =

- Hell on Wheels episode
- Lily Bell (Dominique McElligott) visits the grave of her husband, Robert.
- Episode no.: Season 1 Episode 4
- Directed by: Alex Zakrzewski
- Written by: Jami O'Brien
- Production code: 104
- Original air date: November 27, 2011

Guest appearances
- Ian Tracey as Bolan; Diego Diablo del Mar as Dix; Robin McLeavy as Eva; Duncan Ollerenshaw as Mr. Toole; Andrew Moodie as Henri

Episode chronology
← Previous "A New Birth of Freedom"	Next → "Bread and Circuses"

"Jamais Je Ne T'oublierai" is the fourth episode of the first season of the American television drama series Hell on Wheels; it aired November 27, 2011 on AMC, and was written by Jami O'Brien, directed by Alex Zakrzewski, and produced by Tony Gayton, Joe Gayton, Jeremy Gold, and John Shiban.

The episode centers on Cullen Bohannon (Anson Mount) continuing his vengeful quest of justice for his wife's murder; Lily Bell (Dominique McElligott) arriving at Hell On Wheels and learning more about her deceased husband's employer, Thomas Durant (Colm Meaney), and his railroad; and Elam (Common) finding solace in the arms of another social outcast, Eva (Robin McLeavy), a prostitute bearing a Cheyenne facial tattoo.

== Plot ==
Twenty miles west of Hell On Wheels, at a logging camp, Cullen learns that the mysterious "Harper" has already cut and run — direction, north. Hot on the trail, Cullen spots a figure dressed in Civil War garb, atop a horse. While viewing Harper through a pocket telescope, he sees and hears the man firing at him. Cullen returns fire. Harper strikes first, wounding Cullen's horse, which ends the pursuit.

Lily Bell enters the cemetery made for the massacre victims. Thomas Durant approaches the disheveled, blood-stained woman and assumes she is Robert Bell's widow. He assures her that she is safe and asks how she found the town. She tells him "a southerner" brought her to safety, and Durant correctly guesses he was Bohannon. Durant invites Lily to lodge in his Pullman coach for her duration at Hell on Wheels, offering her clothing, food, and a hot bath (none of which she's had access to in quite some time). When Durant asks Lily if he can get her anything, she requests the reward for her retrieval, so she can give it to the person who deserves it. She doesn't name him to Durant but personally delivers the reward to Joseph Black Moon (Eddie Spears).

Ridiculed that Eva, a cut-rate prostitute, will bed anything but a black man, Elam takes offense. Eva pulls him aside and explains that she will allow him to be a private customer, but for both their sakes, they must keep their liaisons a secret from the white men. At their first secret rendezvous, Eva tells Elam of the day she was bought from Indians for "three blankets and a horse". They bond over the fact that both of them were considered slaves at one time.

At the saloon, the Swede (Christopher Heyerdahl) reveals to Bohannon that he knows Bohannon killed Johnson, but he doesn't know why. The Swede later pays Bohannon some money to overlook the Swede and his men taking some black powder barrels coming in on the train tomorrow. Later, on the street, Reverend Nathaniel Cole (Tom Noonan) condemns Cullen's drinking to "wash away his wickedness". Cole speaks of his own involvement in the brutal massacre called "Bleeding Kansas", a late 1850s conflict over whether or not Kansas would enter the Union as a slave state or free state. Cole was a follower of abolitionist John Brown's, and with Brown's other supporters, killed anyone who owned slaves. Cole admits that he and Cullen were like-minded when it came to slaves, but each had different motivations.

The next morning, the shipment of gunpowder, which is used to loosen rocky ground, explodes on a rail car. Cullen and Lily pitch in to help the wounded, while others at Hell On Wheels attempt to clean up the damage. Once the situation seems under control, Cullen gives orders for the railroad builders to get back to the business at hand.

== Reception ==
Reviews for this episode were positive. TV Fanatic's Sean McKenna thinks the series' characters are finally taking shape. "If you haven't been watching yet, it's time to stamp your ticket because Hell On Wheels is settling itself in as another of AMC's great dramas." IGN's Seth Amitin rated the episode as 7.5/10, saying the overall series still needs direction or "a story that leads its characters into something ... There's just too much going on, without enough focus."

The fourth episode was seen by 3.28 million viewers and received a 1.2 rating among the 18-49 age group.

== Title reference ==
The episode's title translates to: "I will never forget you". The phrase refers both to the characters' lost loves, current dreams, homelands, and various vendettas, and to "A la claire fontaine", the French song (sung in the episode by Henri (Andrew Moodie)) with the following lyrics and translation:

"Il y a longtemps que je t'aime, Jamais je ne t'oublierai." (I have loved you for so long, I will never forget you.)
