= Pride, Pomp and Circumstance =

- Hell on Wheels episode
- Episode no.: Season 1 Episode 6
- Directed by: Michael Slovis
- Written by: Bruce Romans
- Production code: 106
- Original air date: December 11, 2011

Guest appearances
- Christopher Heyerdahl as The Swede; Gerald Auger as Pawnee Killer; James D. Hopkin as Senator Jordan Crane; Kasha Kropinski as Ruth; Robin McLeavy as Eva; Duncan Ollerenshaw as Mr. Toole; Wes Studi as Chief Many Horses; Sharon Taylor as Squaw

Episode chronology
← Previous "Bread and Circuses"	Next → "Revelations"

"Pride, Pomp and Circumstance" is the sixth episode of the first season of the American television drama series Hell on Wheels; it aired December 11, 2011, on AMC, and was written by Bruce Romans and directed by Michael Slovis. The episode title is a quote from Act III, Scene III of William Shakespeare's play Othello. In the episode, Senator Jordan Crane (James D. Hopkin) arrives in town for an arranged peace talk with the Cheyenne and to discuss the Union Pacific Railroad's future with Thomas Durant (Colm Meaney). Cullen Bohannon (Anson Mount) is responsible for security while the natives are in town. He prevents Lily Bell (Dominique McElligott) from causing a scene after she spots a female native wearing Lily's dead husband's hat.

== Plot ==
Thomas Durant prepares the town's makeshift depot for Senator Jordan Crane's arrival via train. Crane arrives and announces that he has come to discuss peace with the Cheyenne people. However, he threatens battle if the natives decline.

Over a meal served outside under a tent, Crane, Durant, and Lily Bell discuss payroll issues and the Union Pacific Railroad's finances. Durant tells the Senator things are fine. Lily comments about her husband Robert's missing survey maps and the path to the Rocky Mountains. Crane informs Durant that the rival Central Pacific Railroad has already laid its 40 miles of track, pushing east from California.

Cullen is responsible for security for the peace talks while the Cheyenne are in Hell on Wheels. Reverend Cole (Tom Noonan) comes to Cullen and asks that he please tell his foremen to keep the peace to prevent bloodshed between the town and the natives. Cullen then asks Elam (Common) to keep his crew civil during their visit. Elam speaks of their recent fisticuffs, and Cullen accuses him of cheating. Elam seems shocked at the mention of his peppered hand wraps and denies cheating.

Out of view from Durant's coach, The Swede (Christopher Heyerdahl) informs Crane that Durant used $147,000 of Union Pacific cash to speculate on railroad stock. Crane wonders about The Swede's interest in the matter. The Swede then requests information about Frank Harper, who is Cullen's current target in avenging his wife's death.

Chief Many Horses (Wes Studi) and his tribe arrive at Hell on Wheels. At the negotiations, the chief scoffs at Durant's opinion that Crane is offering the Cheyenne a better way of life. After debating who really owns the land they're discussing, the Cheyenne or the U.S. government, Durant storms off. The chief has rejected the proposal that his people live on a reservation. Crane warns Chief Many Horses that his people will be killed if he doesn't accept the U.S. government's deal. The chief threatens to slaughter Crane's people in return.

After Durant returns to the table, Chief Many Horses describes Pawnee Killer's "vision" of defeating the train. On a whim, Durant offers the chief's son a chance to make his vision a reality. As the Cheyenne and Hell on Wheels townsfolk watch, Pawnee Killer (Gerald Auger) races on horseback against a locomotive, taking the early lead as the train crew stokes the fire to increase speed. The locomotive eventually bests Pawnee Killer.

Durant boasts over his victory later to Crane, who congratulates him but again vows to ruin him over the embezzlement. Crane reports that he's sold his landholdings and Crédit Mobilier stock to prove he's not bluffing. Durant no longer has a figurative hold on Crane.

At the church tent, Ruth (Kasha Kropinski) and Joseph (Eddie Spears) mutually bond over losing their mothers, but Ruth tells Joseph that his mother cannot be in Heaven since she wasn't a Christian. The two later try to explain Christian beliefs to the female Cheyenne. Lily approaches Cullen to inform him that she is taking his advice and leaving town. She notices a Cheyenne woman wearing her dead husband's hat. Lily tries to snatch it from the squaw, but Cullen wrestles her away. She accuses Joseph of lying when he said it wasn't his tribe that attacked her camp. She intends to tell Durant that Robert's killers are in town. Cullen warns her that the price of her revenge will be the death of innocent women and children. The squaw with Robert's hat later offers it to Lily, stating her husband was killed in the massacre as well, with his own arrow. Lily awkwardly realizes that she killed the squaw's husband. After placing the hat on her husband's grave marker, Lily digs up the missing maps from his grave and gives them to Durant, urging him to complete the railroad.

Chief Many Horses leaves town, warning Joseph about the people with whom he now resides. Meanwhile, at the saloon, Toole (Duncan Ollerenshaw) and his gang attempt to incite the townsfolk against the natives. Although outnumbered, Cullen moves to stop him. The Swede also intervenes, reminding everyone that Durant does not want the natives harmed. The Swede suggests the men "find some amusement here in town". Toole heads with his men to the cathouse, demanding to see Eva, but is told she's not around. Eva (Robin McLeavy) and Elam are dressing in his tent when Toole and his men storm in to beat Elam and drag him away.

== Title reference ==
The episode title is a quote from Act III, Scene III of William Shakespeare's play Othello. In it, the title character bids farewell to being happily married and his career as a military general after receiving news that his wife has been unfaithful. He feels he can no longer experience "pride, pomp, and circumstance of glorious war."

== Reception ==
The episode received mixed reviews from critics. Adam Raymond of New York Magazine conveyed his happiness about seeing trains in the episode: "Before last night’s episode, I was ready to rename it Hell on Hooves because, you know, there are more horses than trains. But then 'Pride, Pomp and Circumstance' arrived bellowing enough black smoke to warrant a visit from the EPA." TV Fanatic's Sean McKenna gave the episode almost 4 out of 5 stars: "'Pride, Pomp and Circumstance' continued to move the show forward in its efforts to draw the characters closer towards a larger conflict ... Here's to hoping that the second half of the season begins to take all of those interesting story lines and make something of them." Phil Nugent of The A.V. Club would prefer the series to center more on Cullen. "The problem with giving the hero of a TV series a vengeance quest for his principal motivation is that, once it’s fulfilled, you have to figure out what he’s going to do next or the series has to end ... If the show becomes swamped by matters in which the man-of-action hero has no stake, then why should we care?"

The sixth episode was watched by 2.15 million viewers and had a 0.6 rating in the 18-49 age range — the lowest viewership of the season, so far.
