= God of Chaos =

- Hell on Wheels episode
- Episode no.: Season 1 Episode 10
- Directed by: David Von Ancken
- Written by: Tony Gayton; Joe Gayton
- Production code: 110
- Original air date: January 15, 2012

Guest appearances
- April Telek as Nell; Christopher Heyerdahl as The Swede; Ian Kilburn as Harper; Robin McLeavy as Eva; Duncan Ollerenshaw as Mr. Toole

Episode chronology
← Previous "Timshel"	Next → "Viva la Mexico"

"God of Chaos" is the tenth episode and the season finale of the first season of the American television drama series Hell On Wheels, which aired on January 15, 2012 on AMC. It is written by Tony Gayton and Joe Gayton, and directed by David Von Ancken. In the episode, Thomas C. Durant (Colm Meaney) and Lily Bell (Dominique McElligott) conspire to gain arriving investors' interests, after she pleads for Cullen Bohannon (Anson Mount) to not let his vengeful path ruin him; Sean and Mickey McGinnes (Ben Esler, Phil Burke) exact their own revenge on The Swede (Christopher Heyerdahl); and Elam (Common) and Eva (Robin McLeavy) each begin to see the future differently.

== Plot ==
The episode opens with a flashback. Home from the Civil War, Cullen finds the barn burning and his home ransacked. He searches for his wife Mary, only to find her dead, hanging from a rafter on the porch. After burying her body and his son's, he rides away.

In the present, Durant continues to celebrate his railroad's reaching the 40-mile goal by hosting a dance, to which senators, investors, and other dignitaries may attend. He asks the town's prostitutes to escort any arriving visitors, telling them to behave like "proper ladies." Sean and Mickey McGinnes inform Cullen that The Swede left town with two bottles of whisky, possibly to get drunk. Cullen tells them that The Swede doesn't drink. Meanwhile, at Council Bluffs, Iowa, The Swede pours drinks for Sergeant Harper (Ian Kilburn). The sergeant produces a document showing that he was discharged from the army two weeks before Mary died, and was not involved. The Swede tells him that he may not have been present, but Harper can still testify to federal marshals about Cullen's motivation to kill Johnson and the other soldiers. The marshals are en route to Hell On Wheels and will protect Harper.

Back in town, Lily struggles to install floorboards in her tent and Cullen stops in to assist her. Lily learns, while Cullen works, that he has lost his wife and son. Not wishing to think about the past, nor discuss it with her, he moves to leave. Lily pleads with him not to let what happened to his wife and son kill the man they loved. Cullen replies that "it's too late for that." After Cullen leaves, Durant visits her, presenting her with a new dress, and asks her to come to the dance to help lure potential investors. She agrees to his current need, after he allows her to remain with the railroad till its completion.

Reverend Cole (Tom Noonan) loads Griggs's body into a coffin. Cullen soon enters the church tent seeking moral guidance. Cole stuns Cullen by lamenting over God's failures in the face of evil, and telling him to choose hate, because "it's so much easier."

The Swede and Harper ride into town. Sean informs Cullen that The Swede's companion is wearing a Union jacket with sergeant's stripes. Cullen returns to his tent and cleans his gun. Elam stops in to suggest that Cullen could be wrong about Harper and, echoing Cullen's advice to Elam about slavery, urges Cullen to let go of the past.

Durant visits The Swede, admitting that he told Cullen about the marshals so he'd leave, but since he hasn't, Durant now wants The Swede's plan to succeed. Later, The Swede warns Harper to hide from Cullen until the marshals reach town that evening. He does hide after seeing Cullen approach the railcar. Cullen enters, armed with a pistol, demanding to know Harper's whereabouts. The Swede claims he doesn't know and dares Cullen to shoot him, which he doesn't.

Eva watches as men erect a permanent town for the people staying behind after the railroad workers move on. Elam appears, and Eva mentions marrying and settling down with him. While he has agreed that he asked her to be "his", he explains that he has just received a taste of freedom, has been well paid by Durant for his labor, and isn't ready for marriage.

At the dance, Durant and Lily impress the investors with tales of the speed traveling across country will be with the railroad. They dance together, but she scans the room for Cullen. In town, Cullen searches for Harper, while the McGinnes brothers and an angry mob surround The Swede. A man on horseback lassos him, and the mob tars and feathers him and runs him out of town. By nightfall, Cullen still hasn't found Harper, but continues searching the camp. As the train bearing the marshals arrives, Cullen finds Harper and chases him down, but loses his gun. Harper picks it up and points it at Cullen. He insists that he has proof he didn't kill Mary. Cullen, refusing to believe him, runs at him, knocks the gun away, and then strangles him. After Harper dies, Cullen sees the discharge notice sticking out of Harper's pocket. Reading the document, Cullen realizes his mistake. At the dance, he watches from afar as Lily dances with Durant. Lily glimpses Cullen, but he slips out of view as Durant wheels her around. When she comes full circle, Cullen is gone. Down by the tracks, Cullen admits to Elam that he killed the wrong man. With the rising sun, Cullen rides out of town and The Swede, scarred from his tarring, comes across a wanted poster offering a $250 bounty for the capture of Cullen Bohannon.

== Reception ==
TV Fanatic's Sean McKenna rated the episode with 4 out of 5 stars, saying, "Overall, 'God of Chaos' didn't end with the same bang that the show first started out with, but it left the door wide open for plenty of strong possibilities for the future." Phil Nugent of The A.V. Club rated the episode a C, saying that the season finale was "livelier" than episodes before it, adding, "Anyone who's ever made a dollar as a storyteller ought to have some ideas about how to get an audience's attention at the start of things, and how to bring things to a boil at the close, especially if the close is also meant to get them to come back in a year."

The season one finale was watched by 2.84 million viewers, marking the highest viewership since the fourth episode, and kept its steady 0.7 rating with the 18-49 age range.
