= Timshel =

- Hell on Wheels episode
- Episode no.: Season 1 Episode 9
- Directed by: John Shiban
- Written by: John Shiban
- Production code: 109
- Original air date: January 8, 2012

Guest appearances
- Wes Studi as Chief Many Horses; Gerald Auger as Pawnee Killer; Robin McLeavy as Eva; Ty Olsson as Griggs; Duncan Ollerenshaw as Mr. Toole; Kasha Kropinski as Ruth; James D. Hopkin as Senator Jordan Crane

Episode chronology
| ← Previous "Derailed" | Next → "God of Chaos" |

"Timshel" is the ninth episode of the first season of the American television drama series Hell on Wheels, which aired on January 8, 2012, on AMC. It is written and directed by John Shiban. In the episode, Cullen Bohannon (Anson Mount) and the search party find the Cheyenne who attacked the surveyor's camp and later derailed a train; Elam (Common) and Eva (Robin McLeavy) discuss their future, before getting a strange visitor; and the railroad crew reaches the important 40-mile mark. The episode title has several meanings – from the Mumford & Sons song of the same name, which was heard in the episode, to the actual Hebrew word translation of man's triumph over sin.

== Plot ==
The Cheyenne renegades attack Cullen and the search party. Bow and arrows and gunfire quickly become a melee. Joseph (Eddie Spears) rescues Griggs (Ty Olsson) from Pawnee Killer (Gerald Auger), who moves to kill Griggs, after a young brave had been killed. Pawnee Killer flees into the woods but is shot dead by Joseph with an arrow. The natives are defeated. Griggs aims to resume tracking the Cheyenne villagers, but no one else wants to continue helping him. Joseph and Elam agree that Durant will want proof of victory. They suggest taking the natives' scalps. Cullen declines, but Elam accepts, knowing Durant's $20-per-head bounty. Thomas C. Durant (Colm Meaney) then enlists Elam to do things "off the books."

Joseph wants to honor his brother's death by burning his body in a funeral pyre. The ritual is attended by his father, Chief Many Horses (Wes Studi), who says he mourns the loss of both of his sons, admitting that losing Joseph to the "white man" hurts him more. The McGinnes Brother's theater is back in business with newly acquired pornographic slides. Bohannon affirms his suspicions that his boxing match had been fixed and is offered a bounty of $100 by Sean McGinnes (Ben Esler) to kill the Swede.

Meanwhile, Elam and Eva cuddle in his tent, discussing their future, when Mr. Toole (Duncan Ollerenshaw) calls to him outside. Toole, his head draped in cloth, is still alive, after the bullet Elam fired into his mouth exited out the back of his neck. Toole begs for forgiveness, and Elam insists that he apologizes instead to Eva. Durant witnesses the Swede (Christopher Heyerdahl) conspiring outside his railcar about the man the Pinkertons located. The Swede later enters the bar and proposes a toast to Bohannon and his company for bravely slaying the Indians. Bohannon instead rallies the bar to hit their 40-mile mark, which they accomplish triumphantly the following day. The camp celebrates, including Lily (Dominique McElligott) who orders a brandy with Bohannon at the bar. Durant sees them and interrupts to tell Bohannon that he's offering him a "bonus" – information that the Swede is plotting against him, by sending telegrams to the authorities with evidence of Bohannon's past murders.

Joseph returns to the church where Ruth (Kasha Kropinski) consoles him over the death of his brother. The two kiss by lantern-light. Meanwhile, Griggs returns to the camp, intent on killing Joseph, but finds only Reverend Cole (Tom Noonan). The reverend pleads for Griggs's forgiveness of Joseph, but Griggs insists that Joseph be killed. As Griggs turns to leave, the reverend removes the soldier's sword and chops off his head.

== Notes ==
The episode's title has several usages. "Timshel" is a song on the album Sigh No More by the group Mumford & Sons. The song plays during the episode's opening battle. "Timshel" or "timshol" (תימשל) is also a Hebrew word which has different translations, including "thou will rule," "thou can rule," or the more proper "thou mayest rule."

== Reception ==
Sean McKenna of TV Fanatic rated the episode with 4 out of 5 stars, saying "'Timshel' was a rather enjoyable piece, touching on all of the major characters." However, The A.V. Club's Phil Nugent rated the episode a D, stating that Hell On Wheels "is the work of hacks, people whose lack of personal obsession and conflicted emotions render it an ambiguity-free zone."

The ninth episode was watched by 2.29 million viewers and had a 0.7 rating with the 18–49 age range – the series' third-lowest viewership of the season.
