= Revelations (Hell on Wheels) =

- Hell on Wheels episode
- Episode no.: Season 1 Episode 7
- Directed by: Michelle MacLaren
- Written by: Tony Gayton; Joe Gayton
- Production code: 107
- Original air date: December 18, 2011

Guest appearances
- Amadou Diallo as Young Elam; Trevor Leigh as The Master; Christopher Heyerdahl as The Swede; Robin McLeavy as Eva; Duncan Ollerenshaw as Mr. Toole; Ian Tracey as Bolan; Diego Diablo Del Mar as Dix; Chantal Perron as Charlotte Bell; James D. Hopkin as Senator Crane

Episode chronology
← Previous "Pride, Pomp and Circumstance"	Next → "Derailed"

"Revelations" is the seventh episode of the first season of the American television drama series Hell On Wheels; it December 18, 2011 on AMC and was written by the series co-creators Joe Gayton and Tony Gayton, and directed by Michelle MacLaren. In the episode, Thomas C. Durant (Colm Meaney) and Lily Bell (Dominique McElligott) travel by train to Chicago, for different reasons; the Irishmen from Hell On Wheels intend to kill Elam (Common) to entertain themselves, but Cullen Bohannon (Anson Mount) interferes and helps Elam escape.

== Plot ==
The episode opens with a flashback. Young Elam Ferguson (Amadou Diallo) reads aloud from the Bible. Elam's "owner" and father (Trevor Leigh) has made a bet with his friends that slaves can be taught to read. The master's friends voice their concerns over this, but the master proves that Elam does not comprehend anything he just read. Later, with his fellow slaves, Elam recites another biblical passage. This particular one is about God's promising to deliver the Israelites from slavery.

In the present, Thomas C. Durant escorts Lily Bell to Chicago. She plans to meet with her deceased husband's family, while Durant plans to meet with Senator Crane (James D. Hopkin) to settle the railroad's financial difficulty.

Meanwhile, Eva (Robin McLeavy) begs Cullen to save Elam. The Swede (Christopher Heyerdahl) is allowing the Irish crew to hang Elam as entertainment. At the saloon, Toole (Duncan Ollerenshaw) strings Elam up, while Cullen charges in on horseback, shoots one man holding the rope, and tells Elam to ride off on one of the horses outside. Cullen cautions the Irish against pursuing them, then he and Elam ride out of town. Later, Bolan (Ian Tracey) and Dix (Diego Diablo Del Mar) lead a posse, which includes Toole, after the wanted men.

Cullen and Elam stop far away from town. Cullen puts the blame on Elam for having sex with a white woman. By a campfire that night, Elam wonders what would happen if he owned a white woman, had a son by her, and educated the boy just enough that he considered himself different from his fellow white slaves. Reflecting on his own life, Elam concludes that, in truth, the boy wouldn't be different at all. Cullen tells Elam he freed his own slaves before the war to please his wife, realizing only later that she was right to make him do so. Following her murder, his barn was set on fire. The slave woman, who raised Cullen, died inside the barn trying to shield his son from the flames. The next morning, Cullen teaches Elam to shoot a gun. Elam misses all the targets. Cullen explains that the better thing to do is to count the rounds and make sure his opponent has to reload his weapon first.

In the train coach, Durant tells Lily that he's figured a way out of his Crane situation. The Union Pacific needs a connecting route back to New York, and the two options are the Mississippi and Missouri Railroad and the R&R Railroad. Durant believes Crane would do anything for a stock tip about Durant's choice.

Durant delivers Lily to Robert's family's home in Chicago for what turns out to be a memorial gathering. Robert's sister Charlotte (Chantal Perron), wearing black, comments that Lily, dressed in red, must have already stopped mourning.

Durant leaves Lily to go to Crane's office. The senator demands the stock tip outright and threatens Durant with prison for remaining silent. Durant tells him to invest in the R&R railroad.

Meanwhile, Lily hears Charlotte mention that Robert would still be alive if he hadn't tried to save Lily. When Lily interjects that she, not Robert, killed their attacker, Charlotte calls her a liar. Lily slaps Charlotte and describes ripping the arrow from her own shoulder and thrusting it into the Indian's throat.

Bolan's men reach Cullen and Elam's camp, which appears abandoned. Bolan discovers warm horse feces and stands to warn the others about the ambush, but he gets shot in the chest. Before he dies, Bolan asks Cullen if he'll find peace on the other side. Cullen states that he doesn't know if men like them ever find peace, but he sure hopes that they will. Cullen kills two more men, and Elam a third. Toole slips into the woods and Elam gives chase. The two fire at each other until Toole maneuvers himself in front of Elam, gun drawn. Smiling, Elam says Toole's gun is empty and offers him last words, but cuts them off by shooting Toole in the mouth.

Durant purchases the M&M Railroad instead of the R&R. He visits Crane's office, gloating over the senator's financial ruin. The deal has yielded Durant $5 million, covering the $147,000 missing from the Union Pacific's funds.

Durant returns to the Bell house in time to hear Lily's account of the Indian massacre. When she finishes, he escorts her away. On the train back to Hell on Wheels, Lily tells Durant that she refuses to return to London and a life she now despises. Durant admires Lily, then tries to woo her.

Meanwhile, standing among the bodies, Cullen finds a Bible and ponders reading a passage over the dead men. Elam suggests the 23rd Psalm. The two men recite it together, Elam from memory.

== Critical and popular reception ==
Sean McKenna of TV Fanatic said, "the episode really captured the core characters in a way that was compelling and entertaining to watch." New York Magazine's Adam Raymond commented, "Hell on Wheels isn’t going to be the tension-filled, character-driven drama we all wanted it to be." Phil Nugent of The A.V. Club stated, "I was rooting for some real action scenes to break [loose] on this show, and "Revelations" makes a couple of large-scale attempts to deliver the goods, but it's a case of too-clumsy-too-late."

The seventh episode was watched by 2.27 million viewers and had a 0.6 rating with the 18-49 age range — gaining more viewers than the previous episode, while maintaining the same age range rating.
