= A New Birth of Freedom =

- Hell on Wheels episode
- Cullen (Anson Mount) protects Lily (Dominique McElligott).
- Episode no.: Season 1 Episode 3
- Directed by: Phil Abraham
- Written by: John Shiban
- Production code: 103
- Original air date: November 20, 2011

Guest appearances
- Christopher Heyerdahl as The Swede; James D. Hopkin as Senator Jordan Crane; Ian Tracey as Bolan; Diego Diablo del Mar as Dix; Dohn Norwood as Psalms; Robin McLeavy as Eva; Duncan Ollerenshaw as Mr. Toole; David Lereaney as Telegraph Operator; Chris Ippolito as Young Engineer; Kassia Warshawski as Mary Bohannon

Episode chronology
| ← Previous "Immoral Mathematics" | Next → "Jamais Je Ne T'oublierai" |

"A New Birth of Freedom" is the third episode of the first season of American television drama series Hell on Wheels; it premiered November 20, 2011 on AMC in the United States, and on TCM in the UK. The episode was written by John Shiban and directed by Phil Abraham.

Cullen Bohannon resumes his quest of vengeance by learning the name of one of the men responsible for his wife's death. His plans change when he crosses paths with Lily Bell and Joseph Black Moon. She has been wounded in a Cheyenne attack on her camp that also killed her husband. Joseph has been seeking answers from his former tribe, including his own brother, about the savage attack.

== Plot ==
While exploring his new canvas home, the foreman's tent, Cullen Bohannon (Anson Mount) comes across a photograph of now-deceased foreman Daniel Johnson, depicting him as a Union captain posing with some of his regiment. Bohannon reflects on having previously killed three men in the picture. His eyes fixate on the last of them: Sergeant Harper, whom Bohannon believes strangled Bohannon's wife and then hanged her body to stage her suicide and cover up the murder.

Back at work, Bohannon gives his crew their cut assignment, but The Swede (Christopher Heyerdahl) has other plans for them: find Lily Bell and receive $100. Bohannon threatens all of them with termination should they take The Swede's offer. Elam (Common), seeing the number of men opting to pursue the bounty, offers that his crew of freedmen can handle the entire assignment, and advises Bohannon to let the white workers who want to go do so. Before releasing the men, Bohannon inquires about a Frank Harper. He's told that Harper was westward with the logging crew.

In Nebraska, Bohannon finds Joseph (Eddie Spears) with an unconscious, feverish Lily (Dominique McElligott), her wounds worsening. Once he removes a sliver of arrow from her shoulder and sees that she's stabilizing, he begins to leave, but quickly returns. He knows Joseph would be killed if Joseph brought Lily back to town. The news of the massacre has circulated, and everyone would assume Joseph, an Indian, was accountable. Therefore, Bohannon escorts Lily. He learns of her bounty when one of the Swede's security force, Mr. Bolan, and two other men, try to "rescue" Lily.

Lily tries to ward them off, but the three are aggressive. They view Lily both as a cash prize and, possibly, as a parallel for Eva (the Cheyenne-tattooed prostitute at Hell on Wheels), because Durant has circulated the story that Lily was "sullied" by her attackers.

Bohannon kills the other two and wounds Bolan by shooting his ear off, then escorts Lily to the perimeter of Hell on Wheels, telling her where to find a doctor there. He leaves her, without collecting the bounty, as he has a higher priority in Cheyenne territory.

Durant telegraphs Senator Crane (James D. Hopkin), appealing for federal troops to help protect his railroad construction. "We must displace the savage," he tells the senator, meaning the Native American tribes. Senator Crane wires back to deny the troop request, and expresses concerns about the slow progress of the construction and Robert Bell's murder.

Durant gets drunk and laments the entire project. He visits the McGinnes brothers' magic-lantern show and pays for a private screening. While viewing the slides of Ireland, Durant asks Sean (Ben Esler) why he and Mickey (Phil Burke) left there to work on the railroad. Mickey tells him of the brothers' experience traveling to Dublin by train as lads. "The railroad gave you freedom," acknowledges Durant.

Reverend Cole (Tom Noonan) conducts a funeral for the massacre victims, quoting the Bible and pleading with the townsfolk not to seek revenge. Durant quotes another biblical passage, describing situations that justify war. Durant takes over the sermon, telling the funeral attendees not to let "Stone Age primitives" slow things down. Praising Joseph for adopting the white man's ways, Durant says there may be peace if other Indians follow Joseph's example. If they don't, he adds, they are the authors of their own destruction.

== Reception ==
"A New Birth of Freedom" garnered mostly favorable reviews. Sean McKenna at TV Fanatic approved, saying "Hell On Wheels continues to chug along and unfold its grand scale filled with revenge, new beginnings, loyalty, and the perfect melting pot of men searching for purpose. The journey is still worth the ride." New York Magazine's Adam Raymond thought the episode was the best of the series so far: "We’re three episodes into Hell on Wheels and things are finally starting to move. Characters are developing, motives are becoming clear, and, for me at least, expectations are lowering, making 'A Birth of Freedoms' easier to enjoy than the last two episodes." IGN, though, rated the show 4.5 out of 10 on their website. Seth Amitin commented: "Dull...Who knows where Hell on Wheels goes from here. By episode three, we, the viewers, should see some major plot arc forming. Hell seems more dystopic than structured and the storylines are meandering."

The third episode was watched by 3.52 million viewers and had a 1.2 rating with the 18-49 age range.

== Title reference ==
The quote "a new birth of freedom" comes from U.S. President Abraham Lincoln's Gettysburg Address, which he delivered during the American Civil War, on Thursday, November 19, 1863, at the dedication of the Soldiers' National Cemetery in Gettysburg, Pennsylvania. He used the term to describe the war's effort to unify the nation and each state's rights.
