= Timshel (disambiguation) =

"Timshel" is an episode of Hell on Wheels.

Timshel may also refer to:

- Timshel (company), a company associated with the Hillary Clinton 2016 presidential campaign
- "Timshel", a song by Mumford & Sons from Sigh No More
- "Timshel", a comic by Lark Pien

== People with the given name ==
- Timshel Matheny, member of Roman Candle

== See also ==
- East of Eden (novel)
