= À la claire fontaine =

Traditional French song

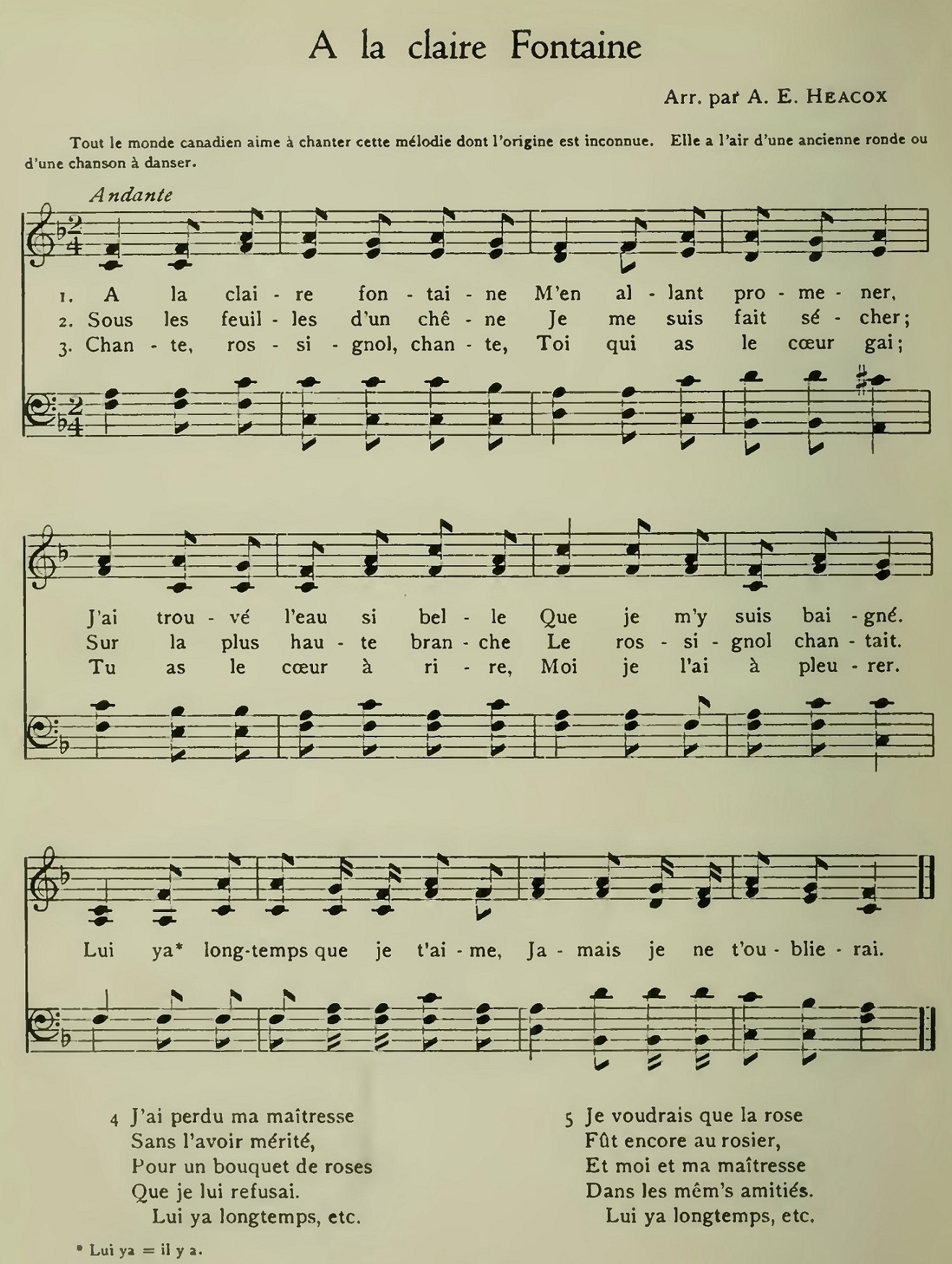

Song
- Language: French
- Released: ~ 1604
- Genre: Traditional
- Songwriter: Unknown

"À la claire fontaine" (French: [a la klɛʁ(ə) fɔ̃tɛn]; lit. 'By the clear fountain') is a traditional French song, which has also become very popular in Belgium and in Canada, particularly in Quebec and the Maritime provinces of New Brunswick, Nova Scotia, and Prince Edward Island.

== History ==
The song may have appeared as early as 1604 when the first permanent French settlement was established in the Maritimes. As with all traditional songs, numerous versions of both music and lyrics can be found, and versions known in France and Belgium vary from those known in Canada.

== Musicality ==
The melody is pentatonic, and uses only four notes of the scale. The verse employs an alternating 7- and 6-syllable, with the refrain adding an extra syllable to each line.

== Meaning ==
Like another famous children's song, "Au clair de la lune", it has an adult theme - in this case, one of lost love. The song speaks of a lover bathing in a fountain, hearing a nightingale singing, and thinking about her lover whom she lost long ago after refusing a bouquet of roses he was offering her, most likely symbolizing him proposing to her. The nightingale's heart laughs but hers weeps.

The refrain is repeated at the end of each verse:

"Il y a longtemps que je t'aime, Jamais je ne t'oublierai."
"I've loved you for a long time, I will never forget you."

The song came to be interpreted as having a hidden political meaning of resistance against British invasion of Canada: the Rose representing the British, the clear fountain representing the St. Lawrence River, and the sentence "I've loved you for a long time, I will never forget you" intended for France and French Canada.

== Complete lyrics ==
The lyrics are:

À la claire fontaine m'en allant promener
J'ai trouvé l'eau si belle que je m'y suis baignée.

(refrain) Il y a longtemps que je t'aime, jamais je ne t'oublierai

Sous les feuilles d'un chêne, je me suis fait sécher.
Sur la plus haute branche, un rossignol chantait.
(refrain)
Chante, rossignol, chante, toi qui as le cœur gai.
Tu as le cœur à rire... moi je l'ai à pleurer.
(refrain)
J'ai perdu mon ami sans l'avoir mérité,
Pour un bouquet de roses que je lui refusai...
(refrain)
Je voudrais que la rose fût encore au rosier,
Et que mon doux ami fût encore à m'aimer.
(refrain)

As I was walking by the clear fountain,
I found the water so lovely I had to bathe.

(refrain) I've loved you for so long, I will never forget you

Under the oak's leaves, I lay and dried.
On the highest bough, a nightingale sang.
(refrain)
Sing, nightingale, sing, you who has a joyous heart.
Your heart is made for laughing... mine can only cry.
(refrain)
I lost my love without deserving it,
Because of a bouquet of roses I refused...
(refrain)
I wish the rose were still on the bush,
And my sweetheart loved me still.

== Regional variants ==
The Quebec oral tradition preserves an additional verse not found in most French versions. This verse, documented in Alan Mills' 1955 recording Folk Songs of French Canada (Folkways FE 4147), extends the narrator's wish beyond the return of the rose:

Je voudrais que la rose
Fût encore au rosier
Et que le rosier même
À la mer fût jeté

I wish the rose
were back on the bush
And that the rosebush itself
Were cast into the sea

== Modern usage ==
The song can be heard at the end of the 2006 film The Painted Veil, sung by a children's choir.

It inspired the title of the 2008 French film Il y a longtemps que je t'aime and appears as a recurring theme.

It has been performed by Dame Emma Albani and Nana Mouskouri, among others. Kate & Anna McGarrigle regularly sang it as an encore in their live performances and released a recording of it on their compilation album ODDiTTiES.

It has been adapted and arranged, notably a choral arrangement by the French composer Jean Langlais, and a jazz version by the English arranger Bob Chilcott.

It was sung by Henri (Andrew Moodie), Thomas Durant's butler, in "Jamais Je Ne T'oublierai - Episode 4", Season 1 of AMC's Hell On Wheels.

Michael Tippett inscribed his String Quartet No. 5 (1990–1) with a verse from the folk song. It lends the quartet a symbolic significance and adds a strong conceptual dimension to the composition.

In a poignant moment at the end of the French film Things to Come (L'Avenir) by Mia Hansen-Løve, 2016, the character Nathalie, played by Isabelle Huppert, sings the song to her granddaughter to comfort her.

Before being approached by a bounty hunter, Rivard can be seen humming the tune in the first episode of Frontier (Netflix) Season 2.

During the Netflix documentary film Icarus, that tells the story of the Russian athletics doping scandal, a rendition of the song sung by artist Genevoise is used to illustrate the heartache felt by Grigory Rodchenkov after he says goodbye to his wife and prepares to enter the United States Federal Witness Protection Program.

In Louis Malle's 1987 film Au Revoir Les Enfants, on their way to the public baths, the main character's group sings the song.

In Sid Meier's Civilization VI, the song is used as an ambient theme for the Canadian civilization in the expansion pack, Sid Meier's Civilization VI: Gathering Storm.

A version of the song is used in Episode 4 of the Netflix Docuseries, The Devil Next Door.

In the 2021 film The French Dispatch the song is sung by the kidnapped son of the police commissioner.

An excerpt of the song is used in Season 3 Ep. 8 of the Netflix show, Shadowhunters: The Mortal Instruments. In City of Ashes, the second book of The Mortal Instruments, it is the lullaby Maryse Lightwood used to sing to her children.

There is a recording by Eva Gauthier available through the United States Library of Congress.

The song was used during the Québec ceremony for the Day of national remembrance of the victims of COVID-19, on 11 March 2021. It was sung by the choral group Les Petits Chanteurs de Beauport.
