= Robert Moloney =

Canadian actor

- Born: Calgary, Alberta, Canada
- Education: Studio 58
- Occupation: Actor
- Years active: 1995–present

Robert Moloney is a Canadian actor, best known for playing Professor Alistair Gryffen in the TV series K-9.

== Life and career ==
Moloney trained at Studio 58 at Langara College in Vancouver, British Columbia. In 1995 he made his first TV appearance as Kevin McSwain in Highlander. In 2001 he appeared as Borren in Stargate SG-1, in 2008 as Koracen in Stargate: Atlantis. In 2007 he received a Leo Award as Best Lead Performance by a Male in a Feature Length Drama for playing Lou Boyd in Christmas on Chestnut Street. In K-9 Moloney played the main character Professor Alistair Gryffen. In 2012 Moloney appeared as David in Random Acts of Romance. Next to his appearances in film and television, Moloney also appears on theatre. For his role in the play Clybourne Park Moloney was awarded the Jessie Richardson Theatre Award as best supporting actor. He also appeared as Astrov in Uncle Vanya. Furthermore he played the radio host Tommy Bane in Except in the Unlikely Event of War.

== Filmography ==
=== Film ===
Year	Title	Role	Notes
1997	Bounty Hunters 2: Hardball	Celia Goffman	Video
2000	Trixie	Alvin	
2008	Impulse	Elliott	Video
2011	The Odds	Bruce Orr	
2012	Random Acts of Romance	David	
2013	Embrace of the Vampire	Dr. John Duncan	Video
2015	The Revenant	Dave Stomach Wound	
2016	Brain on Fire	Dr. Ryan	
2017	While You Were Dating	Kyle	
2017	Power Rangers	Ted Hart	
2017	Day to Night	Darren	Post-production
2021	Diary of a Wimpy Kid	Joshie	Voice

=== Television ===
Year	Title	Role	Notes
1995	Highlander: The Series	Kevin McSwain	"Homeland"
1996	Lonesome Dove: The Series	Tyler Horn	"Bounty", "Angel"
1996	Madison	Fred	"No Sell-Out"
1997	The Sentinel	Tregaser	"Dead Drop"
1997	The X-Files	Bruce Bearfeld	"Tempus Fugit"
1997	Viper	Scott Ramsey	"Whistle Blower"
1998	The Hunted	Dorse	TV film
1998	Playing to Win: A Moment of Truth Movie	Artie	TV film
1998	Voyage of Terror	Simon	TV film
1998	First Wave	Drew	"Hypnotic"
1998	The New Addams Family	Ed	"Halloween with the Addams Family"
1998	Welcome to Paradox	Jules Lawson	"Options"
1998	The Outer Limits	Veeter	"The Hunt"
1999	The Outer Limits	Agent Pinter	"Essence of Life"
1999	Nothing Too Good for a Cowboy	Connor McCann	"The Stud"
1999	Viper	Alan Simms	"Hell Hath No Fury"
1999	A Murder on Shadow Mountain	Prosecuting Attorney Carter	TV film
1999	Sweetwater	Fred Herrera	TV film
1999	Evolution's Child	Craig	TV film
1999	Y2K	Caldwell Stone	TV film
2000	The Spring	Caleb Dunn	TV film
2000	Beggars and Choosers	Ari	"Death in Malibu"
2000	The Immortal	Irv	"Studio D"
2000	Cold Squad	Reed Logan	"Root Cause"
2001	Strange Frequency	Pete	"Cold Turkey"
2001	Stargate SG-1	Borren	"2001"
2001	Pasadena	Carter	"Hostile Environment"
2002	Jeremiah	Farralon	"City of Roses"
2003	The Twilight Zone	Joe	"It's Still a Good Life"
2003	Betrayed	Harvey Swank	TV film
2003	Jake 2.0	Nicholas Wright	"Training Day"
2003	Hollywood Wives: The New Generation	Eric Vernon	TV film
2004	The Dead Zone	Alec	"Speak Now"
2005	Into the West	John Charles Fremont	"Manifest Destiny"
2005	Mayday	Ced Roberts	"Helicopter Down"
2005–2006	Godiva's	Bruce	Recurring role
2006	Disaster Zone: Volcano in New York	Jacob	TV film
2006	Prairie Giant	Woodrow Lloyd	TV miniseries
2006	Touch the Top of the World	Sam	TV film
2006	Reunion	Gary	"1997"
2006	Intelligence	Hardy	"Don't Break Your Brother's Heart"
2006	Christmas on Chestnut Street	Lou Boyd	TV film
2007	Secrets of an Undercover Wife	Paul	TV film
2007	The 4400	Philip Delacroix	"Audrey Parker's Come and Gone"
2007	Masters of Science Fiction	Pierce	"A Clean Escape"
2007	Whistler	Brad Dexter	"Hazed and Confused"
2007	Supernatural	Peter Warren	"Red Sky at Morning"
2007	Kaya	Rossi	Main role
2008	Storm Cell	Sean	TV film
2008	Stargate: Atlantis	Koracen	"Ghost in the Machine"
2008	Trial by Fire	Dan	TV film
2009	Ice Twisters	Frank	TV film
2009–2010	K9	Professor Alistair Gryffen	Main role
2011	Fairly Legal	Paul Hainsley	"Coming Home"
2011	He Loves Me	Charlie	TV film
2011	R. L. Stine's The Haunting Hour: The Series	Charles	"My Sister the Witch"
2011	Endgame	Gavin Grady	"Gorillas in our Midst"
2011	True Justice	DEA Agent Victor Zollo	"Street Wars: Part 2", "Payback"
2011	Hell on Wheels	Robert Bell	"Hell on Wheels"
2011	Deck the Halls	Austin	TV film
2011	17th Precinct	Deputy Mayor Ben Cole	TV film
2012	Arctic Air	Jack Andrews	"Vancouver Is Such a Screwed Up City"
2012	Rags	Arthur McGowens	TV film
2012	Arrow	Commissioner Brian Nudocerdo	"Year's End"
2013	End of the World	Reiser	TV film
2013	The Mystery Cruise	Oliver	TV film
2013	Almost Human	Sebastian Jones	"Skin"
2014	The Good Mistress	Lloyd Lawson	TV film
2014	Bates Motel	Lee Berman	"Gone But Not Forgotten"
2014	Motive	Craig Davis	"Kiss of Death"
2015	If There Be Thorns	Malcolm Foxworth	TV film
2015	Supernatural	Rudy	"The Prisoner", "Brother's Keeper"
2015	Signed, Sealed, Delivered: Truth Be Told	Captain Markham	TV film
2016	Appetite for Love	Deacon	TV film
2016	A Heavenly Christmas	Tyler	TV film
2016	The Man in the High Castle	Hector	"Travelers"
2017	He Loves You Not	Stu Brown	TV film, post-production
2019	You Me Her	Ben Silva	TV series
2022	Resident Alien	Tanner Corrington	TV series
2023	Christmas on Cherry Lane	Quinn Lewis	Television film

== Awards and nominations ==
Leo Awards

- 2007: Best Lead Performance by a Male in a Feature Length Drama (Christmas on Chestnut Street)

Jessie Richardson Theatre Awards

- 2012-2013: Outstanding Performance by an Actor in a Supporting Role (Clybourne Park)
