= John Shiban =

American television writer and producer

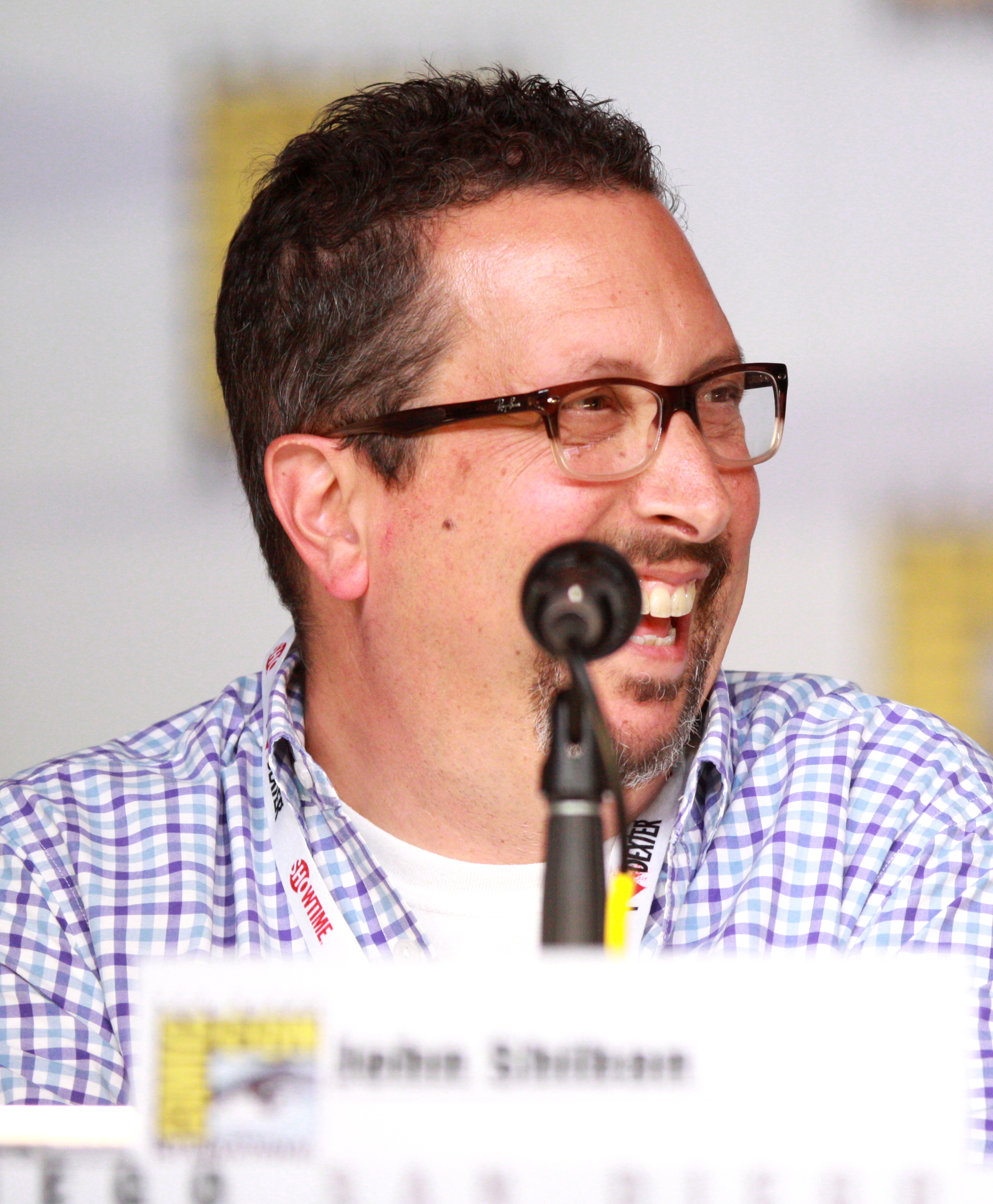
- Shiban in 2013
- Occupations: Television writer, producer and director
- Writing career
- Notable works: The X-Files; Breaking Bad; Torchwood: Miracle Day

John Shiban is an American television writer and producer.

== Career ==
Shiban worked in both capacities on The X-Files, its spin-off The Lone Gunmen, Star Trek: Enterprise, Smallville, Supernatural, Legend of the Seeker, Breaking Bad, and The Vampire Diaries. In 1997, he was nominated for a Primetime Emmy Award for Outstanding Writing for a Drama Series for his work on The X-Files episode "Memento Mori". He shared the nomination with co-writers Chris Carter, Frank Spotnitz, and Vince Gilligan. In 1998, Shiban shared a nomination for the Primetime Emmy Award for Outstanding Drama Series with The X-Files production team.

In 2009, Shiban reunited with Gilligan to work as a writer/producer on the second season of Gilligan's series Breaking Bad. Shiban was nominated for a Writers Guild of America Award for episodic drama for the episode "Phoenix" in 2010. Shiban and the writing staff also shared a nomination for the WGA award for best drama series for their work on the second season. Shiban returned as a consulting producer for the third season of Breaking Bad. He left the crew at the end of the third season.

In August 2010, Shiban was confirmed as a writer for Torchwood's fourth series Torchwood: Miracle Day.

In 2011, Shiban joined the series Hell on Wheels as executive producer and writer. In November 2012, the show's creators Joe and Tony Gayton decided to no longer be involved in the day to day production. Shiban was thought to be a good candidate to take over, however he stated that he would also be leaving the series. Since 2020, he has been writing and executive producing for the show Ozark.

== Credits ==
=== The X-Files ===
Story Editor/Co-Producer/Producer/Supervising Producer/Co-Executive Producer/Executive Producer
Season	Title	Notes
3	"The Walk"	Writer
3	"Teso Dos Bichos"	Writer
4	"El Mundo Gira"	Writer
4	"Leonard Betts"	Written by Shiban & Vince Gilligan & Frank Spotnitz
4	"Memento Mori"	Mythology; Written by Shiban & Chris Carter & Vince Gilligan & Frank Spotnitz; Nominated for a Primetime Emmy Award for Outstanding Writing for a Drama Series
4	"Elegy"	Writer
5	"Christmas Carol"	Written by Shiban & Vince Gilligan & Frank Spotnitz
5	"Emily"	Follows on from "Christmas Carol"; Written by Shiban & Vince Gilligan & Frank Spotnitz
5	"Travelers"	Written by Shiban & Frank Spotnitz
5	"All Souls"	Written by Shiban & Frank Spotnitz
5	"The Pine Bluff Variant"	Writer
6	"Dreamland"	Written by Shiban & Vince Gilligan & Frank Spotnitz
6	"Dreamland II"	Follows on from "Dreamland"; Written by Shiban & Vince Gilligan & Frank Spotnitz
6	"S.R. 819"	Mythology; Writer
6	"Monday"	Written by Shiban & Vince Gilligan
6	"Milagro"	Story by Shiban & Frank Spotnitz (Teleplay by Chris Carter)
6	"Three of a Kind"	Written by Shiban & Vince Gilligan
6	"Field Trip"	Teleplay by Shiban & Vince Gilligan (Story by Frank Spotnitz)
7	"The Amazing Maleeni"	Written by Shiban & Vince Gilligan & Frank Spotnitz
7	"Theef"	Written by Shiban & Vince Gilligan & Frank Spotnitz
8	"Badlaa"	Writer
9	"Underneath"	Writer & Director
9	"Jump the Shark"	Written by Shiban & Vince Gilligan & Frank Spotnitz
9	"Release"	Story by Shiban & David Amann (Teleplay by Amann)

=== Breaking Bad ===
Writer/Director/Consulting Producer
Season	Title	Notes
2	"Negro y Azul"	Writer
2	"Phoenix"	Writer
3	"Sunset"	Writer & Director
3	"Abiquiu"	Co-writer with Thomas Schnauz

=== Torchwood: Miracle Day ===
Writer
Episode	Title	Notes
4	"Escape to L.A."	Co-writer with Jim Gray
6	"The Middle Men"	Writer

=== Hell on Wheels ===
Writer/Director/Executive Producer
Season	Title	Notes
1	"A New Birth of Freedom"	Writer
1	"Timshel"	Writer & Director
2	"Durant, Nebraska"	Writer
2	"Blood Moon Rising"	Writer & Director

=== Better Call Saul ===
Writer/Director/Executive Producer
Season	Title	Notes
2	"Rebecca"	Director
3	"Sunk Costs"	Director
4	"Talk"	Director

=== Shut Eye ===
Writer/Director/Executive Producer
Season	Title	Notes
2	"We're Not in Kansas Anymore"	Writer
2	"Karma Charmeleon"	Writer & Director
2	"There's No Place Like Home"	Writer & Director

=== NOS4A2 ===
Writer/Director/Executive Producer
Season	Title	Notes
1	"The Graveyard of What Might Be"	Director
1	"The Gas Mask Man"	Director
2	"Bad Father"	Director
2	"Good Mother"	Director

=== Ozark ===
Writer/Executive Producer
Season	Title	Notes
3	"Boss Fight"	Writer
3	"BFF"	Writer
4	"Ace Deuce"	Writer
4	"You're the Boss"	Writer

=== Supernatural ===
Writer/Co-Executive Producer/Executive Producer
Season	Title	Notes
1	"Skin"	Writer
1	"Hook Man"	Writer
1	"Scarecrow"	Teleplay by Shiban (Story by Patrick Sean Smith)
1	"The Benders"	Writer
1	"Dead Man's Blood"	Written by Shiban & Cathryn Humphris
2	"Everybody Loves a Clown"	Writer
2	"Croatoan"	Writer
2	"Tall Tales"	Writer
2	"Folsom Prison Blues"	Writer

=== Star Trek: Enterprise ===
Writer/Co-executive Producer
Season	Title	Notes
2	"Minefield"	Writer
2	"Dawn"	Writer
2	"Canamar"	Writer
2	"The Breach"	Teleplay by Shiban & Chris Black (Story by Daniel McCarthy)
2	"First Flight"	Written by Shiban & Chris Black
