= Mark Richard =

American writer, novelist, and poet

- Born: 1955 (age 70–71); Lake Charles, Louisiana, United States
- Occupations: author, screenwriter, poet
- Writing career
- Genres: poetry, short stories, television, film

Mark Richard is an American short story writer, novelist, screenwriter, and poet. He is the author of two award-winning short story collections, The Ice at the Bottom of the World and Charity, a bestselling novel, Fishboy, and House of Prayer No. 2: A Writer's Journey Home.

== Early life ==
Mark Richard was born in Lake Charles, Louisiana, and grew up in Texas and Virginia. As heard on the Diane Rehm Show on NPR: He grew up in the 1960s in a racially divided rural town in Virginia. His family was poor. He was born with deformed hips and spent years in and out of charity hospitals. When his father walked out, his mother withdrew further into a world of faith. In a new memoir "House of Prayer No. 2" he details growing up in the American South as a "The Special Child" and how the racial tensions and religious fervor of his home town animate his writing today.

He attended college at Washington and Lee University.

== Career ==
His first book, the short story collection The Ice at the Bottom of the World, won the 1990 PEN/Ernest Hemingway Foundation Award. His short stories have appeared in The New Yorker, Harper's, Esquire, GQ, The Paris Review, The Oxford American, Grand Street, Shenandoah, The Quarterly, Equator, and Antaeus.

He is the recipient of the PEN/Ernest Hemingway Award, a National Endowment for the Arts fellowship, a Whiting Award, a New York Foundation for the Arts fellowship, the Mary Francis Hobson Medal for Arts and Letters, and a National Magazine Award for Fiction. He has been writer-in-residence at the University of California Irvine, University of Mississippi, Arizona State University, the University of the South, Sewanee, and The Writer's Voice in New York. His journalism has appeared in The New York Times, Harper's, Spin, Esquire, George, Detour, Vogue, The Oxford American, and The Southern Review, and he has been a correspondent for the BBC.

He has also worked as a screenwriter, writing the 2008 war drama Stop-Loss. He wrote and produced on several television series, such as Chicago Hope, The Man in the High Castle, Fear the Walking Dead and Hell on Wheels. He co-created and wrote the Showtime limited series, The Good Lord Bird, which starred Ethan Hawke as abolitionist, John Brown.

== Personal life ==
He lives in Los Angeles with his wife Jennifer Allen and their three sons.
