= Gerald Auger =

Canadian film actor

- Born: Gerald Auger; Wabasca, Alberta, Canada
- Years active: 1995–present
- Website: www.geraldauger.ca

Gerald Auger (born March 20, 1978) is an Indigenous Canadian actor, producer, writer, director entrepreneur and motivational speaker of Woodland Cree descent.

== Biography ==
He graduated from Grande Prairie Regional College in 1995 with a Marketing Management diploma and a Small Business Management certificate. He also became president of the campus’ Student Association, president of the Student Society for Alberta Vocational College and the Circle of Aboriginal Students, and received the Charles S. Noble Student Leadership Award from the Department of Advanced Education and the Province of Alberta.

In 1996 and 1997 Auger was awarded the National Native Role Model by the Governor General of Canada and spent the next two years visiting more than 30 communities across Canada, inspiring his aboriginal peers, relating stories about his experiences and bonding with locals through cultural events and ceremonies. Auger is the first aboriginal recipient of the Rotary International Integrity Award for the Avenue of Nations in Alberta.

After being spotted at the opening ceremonies of the 1995 Canada Winter Games, Auger was given a supporting role in the 1998 film Il mio West (later dubbed Gunslinger’s Revenge), also starring David Bowie and Harvey Keitel. Filmed in Italy for Pacific Pictures, it was the first Spaghetti Western to use First Nations actors in aboriginal roles.

In 1999 Auger became the first aboriginal recipient of the Rotary International Integrity Award for the Avenue of Nations in Alberta.

Auger had a lead role in the 2002 National Geographic IMAX-production Lewis & Clark: Great Journey West, and the next year he played Crow Hunter in an episode of the four-part Hallmark Entertainment TV miniseries Dreamkeeper.

In 2005 Auger had the supporting lead of Soaring Eagle in the first episode of the Steven Spielberg’s DreamWorks-produced six-part miniseries Into the West; in 2006 he completed the film Klatsassin with Stan Douglas; and in 2007 he was cast as Chief Ambrose McQuinna in the CTV-produced Luna: Spirit of the Whale with Adam Beach, Graham Greene, Tantoo Cardinal and Jason Priestley of Beverly Hills, 90210.

In addition to being in the opening and closing ceremonies for the Arctic Winter Games as Anook the Rockman for The Heroes Journey in 2010, Auger had a role in the cult classic FUBAR 2 and played a Native guide and interpreter in Western Confidential (starring FUBAR’s Paul Spence) as well as a Native policeman in The Plateau.

In 2011 Auger had a cameo on primetime series Blackstone and landed the lead role of Pawnee Killer who represents the Indian resistance in Entertainment One's historical western drama Hell on Wheels, directed by David Von Ancken and filmed in Calgary.

Auger produced, wrote and directed the 2007 short film Walking Alone about the life of rapper Shawn Bernard, and the 2008 National Film Board of Canada documentary Honour Thy Father that tells the story of his conflict with the Anglican Church (which refused his late father to have a traditional native funeral), and won Best Film Representing Cultural Diversity at the Alberta Motion Picture Industry Awards in 2009.

In 2012 he wrote and produced the series The Ancients for Aboriginal Peoples Television Network and worked on the sequel to his film Honour Thy Father—Our Journey Home, which deals with Christianity and Native spirituality in Indian country. He was also cast in the soon-to-be filmed Scattered Leaves: Legend of the Ghostkiller and the horror movie The Silent Darkness—The Rise of The Witch.

Auger has been featured in commercials for Pfizer Pharmaceuticals in Los Angeles and a South Korean car commercial for Magnus.

As Owner and President of the business 4 Directional Studios www.4directionalstudios.com, Auger aims to produce films, television series and documentaries aiming to advance the status and expose the stereotyping of his people.

In 2013, Auger worked on his latest film project Yeshua in the Lodge – The Forgotten Truth of the Wilderness where he explored the idea that the Son of God was the first Sundancer, for he was one of the first men to give his flesh to a tree.

Auger had a busy fall in 2015, with roles in three short films. In October, he flew to St. Petersburg, Russia to film Petersburg. A Selfie, a collection of seven stories by director Natalia Kudryashova. The theme is Russia’s most beautiful city seen through the perspective of seven women on the concept of love. Anichkov Bridge is one of the stories in which Auger plays a modern-day Native American with a rock star style, making cinematic history as the first indigenous actor to shoot a film in Russia. In 2016, he played the native chief Makamuk in the short film Lost Face, directed by Sean Meehan, a retelling of the classic story by Jack London that takes place in mid-1800s Russian America.

== Film ==
- Il mio West (1998) – Native warrior
- Lewis & Clark: Great Journey West (2002) – Shoshone chief
- Klatsassin (2006)
- Murder Inc.
- Luna: Spirit of The Whale (2007) – Chief Ambrose McQuinna
- FUBAR 2 (2010)
- Alone (2010) – Native policeman
- The Plateau (2010) – Mike Cardinal
- Western Confidential (2011) – Native guide and interpreter
- Anichkov Bridge (2015) – Modern-day Native in Russia

== Television ==
- Be Aware
- North of 60
- The Long Walk
- Stories from the 7th Fire
- How the Fiddle Flows (2002)
- Dreamkeeper (2003) – Crow Hunter
- Into the West (2005) – Soaring Eagle
- Blackstone (2011) – Dan Brown
- Hell on Wheels (2011, 2012) – Cheyenne Brave Pawnee Killer

== Video Short ==
- Higher Ground (2011) – Komonake

== Docudrama/Industrial ==
- I Am Alcohol
- Crimestoppers
- I Will Not Cry Alone
- Dream Makers (2006)

== Voice-over roles ==
- Cree 10/20/30
- Blanket of Silence
- Stories from the 7th Fire

== Theatre ==
- Canada Winter Games opening ceremonies (1995) – performer
- Canada Winter Games opening and closing ceremonies (2010) – Anook the Rockman
- National Aboriginal Achievement Awards

== Filmmaking ==
- Walking Alone (2007) – film
- Honour Thy Father (2008) – documentary
- Jesus in the Lodge – The Forgotten Truth of the Wilderness (2013) – documentary
- Bohemian Blood (2015) – short film
