= Tony Gayton =

American movie producer and screenwriter

Tony Gayton is an American movie producer and screenwriter.

== Early life ==
Gayton graduated from Merritt Island High School in 1977 in Merritt Island, Florida. Gayton is also a graduate of the USC School of Cinematic Arts, where he received the Jack Nicholson Writing Scholarship.

== Career ==
After graduating, he worked as a production assistant for John Milius. Gayton has been a professional screenwriter for over ten years, working both by himself and with his brother, Joe Gayton (Uncommon Valor, Shout).

Gayton also directed the critically acclaimed documentary film Athens, GA: Inside/Out, which featured the bands R.E.M. and the B-52's as well as the eccentric folk artist Reverend Howard Finster.

Gayton produced the 2010 action-drama Faster, co-written with his brother Joe, and starring Dwayne Johnson and Billy Bob Thornton.

In 2011, he and brother Joe teamed up again to create a dramatic television series for the cable channel AMC, titled Hell On Wheels, which premiered on November 6. Set in 1865, the series centers on the settlement and its people that accompanied the construction of the first transcontinental railroad, referred to as "Hell on Wheels."

== Filmography ==
=== Films ===
Year	Title	Notes
1983	Uncommon Valor	Assistant: John Milius
1987	Athens, GA: Inside/Out	Director, screenwriter
1995	Riders in the Storm	Based on an idea (uncredited)
2002	Murder By Numbers	Screenwriter
2002	The Salton Sea	Screenwriter
2005	Cursed	Screenwriter (uncredited)
2006	Two Headed Cow	Director, screenwriter
2010	Faster	Co-screenwriter, producer
2024	Absolution	Screenwriter

=== Television ===
Year	Title	Notes
2006	Southern Comfort	Screenwriter, TV movie
2011-2016	Hell on Wheels	Creator, Writer, Executive Producer, Executive Consultant
2014	The Novice	Screenwriter, Executive Producer, TV Movie
TBA	The Magnificent Seven	Executive Producer

=== Unrealized projects ===
Title and Description	Ref.
Airtight, co-written with Joe Gayton, a caper pic set in contemporary Florida that would have been directed by Neil Burger.	
All the Men in the Sea: The Untold Story of One of the Greatest Rescues in History, an adaption of the nonfiction book by Michael Krieger that tells the story of the divers and seamen of a cargo ship caught in the path of Hurricane Roxanne, with John Moore attached as director.	
An untitled suspense thriller that centered on a man’s journey to clear his name as a suspect in a 20-year-old unsolved murder that would have been produced by Harry Colomby for Castle Rock Entertainment.	
Con Game, An action heist script about four convicts who pull off a big heist with a perfect alibi.	
The Dime, An adaptation of the Kathleen Kent novel of the same name that would have been produced by Matt Reeves.	
Thicker Than Water, a comedy about two brothers in Las Vegas, that would have been produced by Jim Kouf and Lynn Bigelow.	
Zero Hour, An adaption of the Joseph Finder novel of the same name.	
