= David Von Ancken =

American filmmaker (1964–2021)

- Born: David Henry Von Ancken; December 5, 1964; New York City, U.S.
- Died: July 26, 2021 (aged 56); Agoura Hills, California, U.S.
- Occupations: Film director, television director, screenwriter
- Years active: 1997–2020

David Henry Von Ancken (December 5, 1964 – July 26, 2021) was an American film director, television director and screenwriter.

== Life and career ==
He directed one feature film, the 2006 Western Seraphim Falls starring Liam Neeson and Pierce Brosnan.

Some of Von Ancken's credits as a television director include Oz, Without a Trace, Numb3rs, The Shield, Heroes, Gossip Girl, CSI: NY, Cold Case, Californication, Tut, Ghost Wars, Hell on Wheels, The Vampire Diaries and The InBetween.

Von Ancken died on July 26, 2021, at his home in Agoura Hills, California, after battling stomach cancer. He was 56 years old.

== Filmography ==
Short film

Year	Title	Director	Writer	Executive producer
1997	Box Suite	Yes	Yes	No
2001	Bullet in the Brain	Yes	Yes	No
2010	Elegy	No	No	Yes

Feature film

Year	Title	Director	Writer	Executive producer
2006	Seraphim Falls	Yes	Yes	No
2021	The Last Son	No	No	Yes

Television

Title	Year	Director^{[*]}	Executive producer	Notes
Oz	2003	Yes (1)	No	
Touching Evil	2004	Yes (1)	No	
The Jury	2004	Yes (1)	No	
Cold Case	2004–09	Yes (7)	No	
Without a Trace	2004	Yes (1)	No	
Jonny Zero	2005	Yes (1)	No	
Numbers	2005–06	Yes (2)	No	
CSI: NY	2005–12	Yes (9)	No	
The Shield	2005	Yes (1)	No	
Day Break	2007	Yes (1)	No	
Saving Grace	2007	Yes (1)	No	
Californication	2007–14	Yes (15)	No	
Heroes	2008	Yes (1)	No	
Gossip Girl	2008	Yes (1)	No	
The Vampire Diaries	2010–13	Yes (3)	No	
Memphis Beat	2010	Yes (1)	No	
Awakening	2011	Yes	No	Unsold pilot for The CW
Hell on Wheels	2011–16	Yes (8)	Yes	Executive producer (season 1); Consulting producer (season 2)
Person of Interest	2012	Yes (1)	No	
The Mentalist	2012	Yes (1)	No	
Body of Proof	2013	Yes (1)	No	
House of Lies	2013	Yes (1)	No	
The Following	2013	Yes (1)	No	
Hostages	2013	Yes (1)	No	
Intelligence	2014	Yes (1)	No	
Salem	2014	Yes (5)	Yes	Executive producer (season 1)
Tut	2015	Yes (3)	Yes	Miniseries
Code Black	2015–17	Yes (7)	Yes	Executive producer (season 1: 13 episodes, season 2)
MacGyver	2016	Yes (1)	Yes	Director (Unaired pilot); Executive producer (episode "The Rising")
Ghost Wars	2017–18	Yes (1)	Yes	
The Crossing	2018	Yes (2)	Yes	Executive producer (10 episodes)
The Purge	2018	Yes (1)	No	
The InBetween	2019	Yes (2)	Yes	Executive producer (9 episodes)
The Order	2019–20	Yes (3)	Yes	Executive producer (19 episodes)

- * The numbers in parentheses indicate the amount of directed episodes of the corresponding series.
