= Eddie Spears =

American actor (born 1982)

- Born: Edward Spears; November 29, 1982 (age 43); Chamberlain, South Dakota, U.S.
- Occupation: Actor
- Years active: 1992–present
- Family: Michael Spears (brother)

Edward Spears (born November 29, 1982) is an American actor.

== Early life ==
Spears was born in Chamberlain, South Dakota, near the Lower Brulé Indian Reservation. He has five brothers and one sister; his older brother Michael is also an actor. Spears grew up on the Lower Brulé Indian Reservation until the first grade when his family moved to Pierre, South Dakota. After that, his family moved to Aberdeen, South Dakota, where he grew up and attended Aberdeen Central High School.

== Career ==
=== Acting ===
Spears began his acting career at age ten. His first role was in TNT's production of Geronimo, which was shot in Arizona.

Spears has said his most rewarding role to date was Shane Chasing Horse in the 2003 film Dreamkeeper.

When cast for the lead in the 2004 film Black Cloud (directed by Rick Schroder), he trained for three months with boxing trainer Jimmy Gambia before filming started. The film is about a Navajo boxer training for the Golden Gloves with the promise of a spot at the Olympics while struggling with the secrets of his family's past. One of the scenes was filmed in Las Vegas during the 2003 Golden Gloves National Championship.

In 2011 and 2012, Spears played Joseph Black Moon in AMC's TV series Hell On Wheels. Spears was the voice of "Grey Beaver" in the 2018 animated film White Fang.

Recent TV spots include a 2019 supporting role in season 2 of the TV series Yellowstone and a cameo in season 2 of Rutherford Falls on Peacock.

=== Other work ===
In 2005, Spears and his brother Michael modeled for Cochiti Pueblo fashion designer Virgil Ortiz for his "Indigene" clothing line, and were featured on the cover of the August 2005 issue of New Mexico Magazine.

== Awards ==
- FAITA Best Actor Award in 2004 for Hallmark Entertainment's miniseries Dreamkeeper.
- Phoenix Film Festival Best Actor Award in 2004 for his lead role in Black Cloud.
- Bronze Wrangler Award at the Western Heritage Awards in 2012 for lead actor in Yellow Rock
- Red Nation Film Festival and Awards: Nominated in 2014 for Best Supporting Actor in TV Movie, Miniseries, Special, Comedy or Pilot as Joseph Black Moon in Hell on Wheels .

== Personal life ==
Spears co-hosted the 39th Annual American Indian Film Institute Awards in 2014 along with actress Tonantzin Carmelo. Spears attended and was a mentor at the second annual HatcH Audiovisual Festival in Bozeman, Montana in October 2005.

Spears and his brother Michael also worked with Native Wind and ICOUP (Intertribal Council on Utility Policy), of which their father Patrick Spears was formerly president. ICOUP was formed in 1994 to provide a forum for utility issues discussion from regulatory and economic perspectives.

Spears speaks some Lakota. He is an avid outdoorsman, powwow singer, and Traditional and Grass dancer. He also travels nationally as a keynote speaker. He currently resides in Montana.

== Filmography ==
Year	Title	Role	Notes
1993	Geronimo	Ishkiye	TV
1998	The Witness	Wampishe	Film
2002	The Slaughter Rule	Tracy Two Dogs	Film
2003	Dreamkeeper	Shane Chasing Horse	Film
2003	Edge of America	Franklin	Film
2004	Black Cloud	Black Cloud	Film
2005	Into the West	Red Lance	TV mini-series
2007	Bury My Heart at Wounded Knee	Chasing Crane	TV
2008	Comanche Moon	Quannah Parker	TV mini-series
2011	Guns, Girls and Gambling	Darkeyes	Film
2011	The Legend of Hell's Gate: An American Conspiracy	Wakaree	Film
2011	Yellow Rock	Angry Wolf	Film
2011-2012	Hell On Wheels	Joseph Black Moon	TV series
2013	We The People	Narrator	Documentary
2014	Sleepy Hollow	Big Ash	TV series
2015	Z Nation	Gordon Red Hawk	TV series
2015	Bone Tomahawk	Warrior	Film
2017	Longmire	Elwood	TV series
2018	White Fang	Grey Beaver	Animated Film
2019	Yellowstone	Marcus	TV series
2021	Chief Tendoy	General Parker	Short Film
2022	Rutherford Falls	Curtis	TV series
2022	Deep Woods	Nick Youngblood	Film
2025	Frontier Crucible	TBA	Film
2026	The Lowdown	Mekko Dean	TV series
