= Dominique McElligott =

Irish semi-retired actress (born 1986)

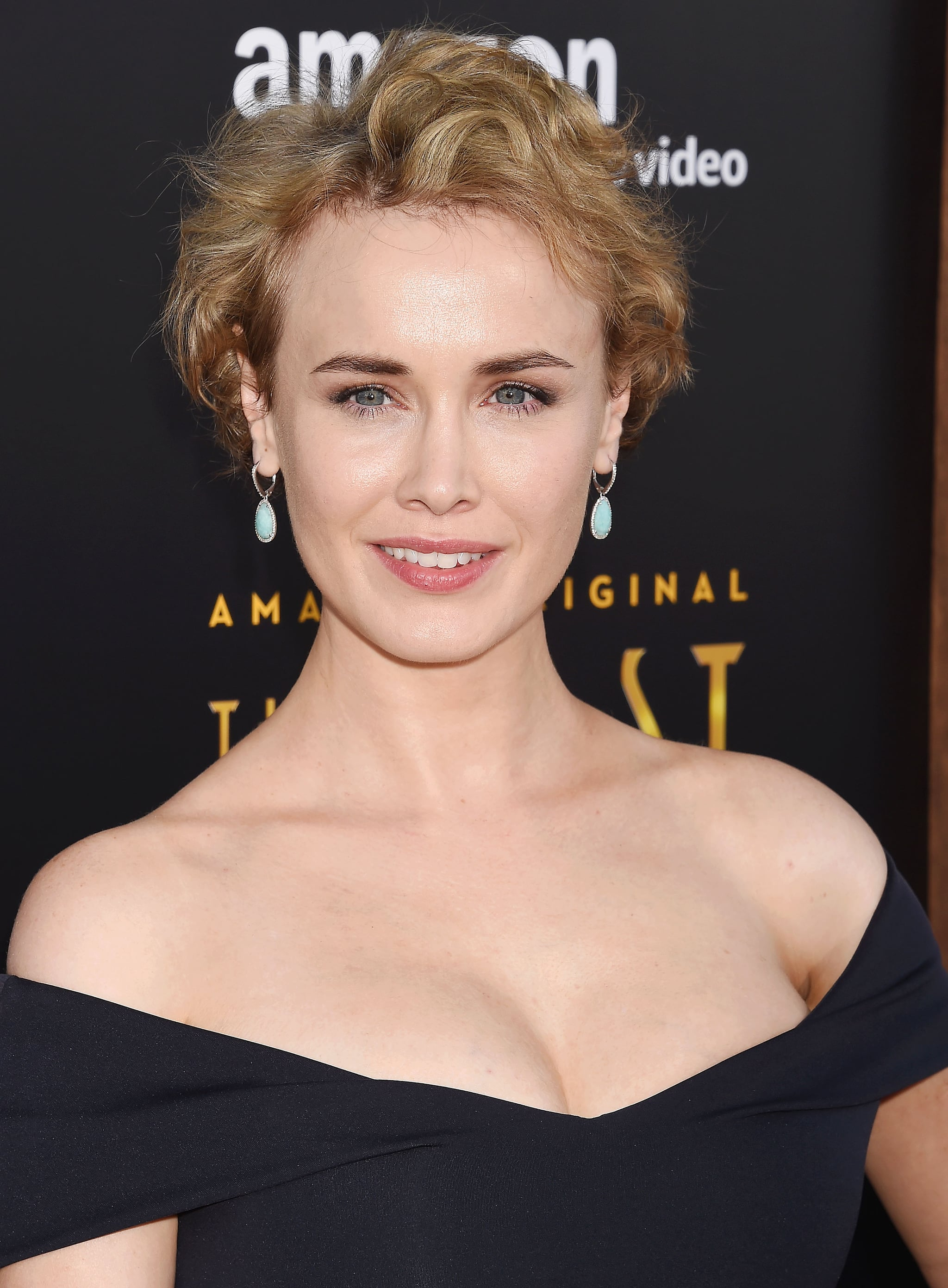
- McElligott in July 2017
- Born: 5 March 1986 (age 40); Dublin, Ireland
- Education: University College Dublin
- Occupation: Actress
- Years active: 2001–2022

Dominique McElligott (born 5 March 1986) is an Irish semi-retired actress. She appeared as a series regular on Raw (2008), Hell on Wheels (2011–2012), The Astronaut Wives Club (2015), House of Cards (2016–2017), and The Last Tycoon (2016). She portrayed Maggie Shaw / Queen Maeve in the superhero series The Boys (2019–2022) and The Boys Presents: Diabolical (2022).

== Early life and education ==
McElligott grew up in Dublin and began acting during secondary school. She is a graduate of University College Dublin.

== Career ==
McElligott's first role was alongside Sean McGinley and Amy Huberman in the 2001 RTÉ television series On Home Ground, which was set in a rural Gaelic football club. She starred in Moon (2009) and the RTÉ series Raw before leaving to film Leap Year (2010). In 2011, she appeared in the movie The Guard. From 2011 to 2012, she played a lead role in the AMC series Hell on Wheels. In 2015, she starred in ABC's The Astronaut Wives Club. In 2016, McElligott played Hannah Conway, wife of the Republican presidential nominee, in the fourth and fifth season of the Netflix show House of Cards. She played Queen Maeve on Amazon Prime Video's original series The Boys, which is based on the comic book series of the same name. In a 2026 interview, series creator Eric Kripke said that she had "mostly retired" from acting.

== Filmography ==
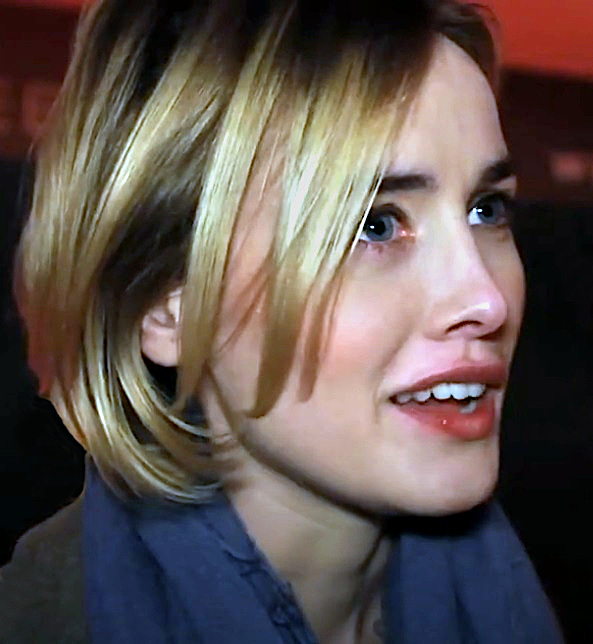
Dominique McElligott at JDIFF 2012

=== Film ===
Year	Title	Role
2008	Dark Floors	Emily
2008	Satellites & Meteorites	Dr. Johnson
2009	Moon	Tess Bell
2010	Leap Year	Bride
2011	The Guard	Aoife O'Carroll
2011	Blackthorn	Etta Place
2012	Not Fade Away	Joy Dietz
2019	Two/One	Martha

=== Television ===
Year	Title	Role	Notes
2001–2002	On Home Ground	Cora Collins	10 episodes
2005	Whiskey Echo	Rachel	Television film
2008	Being Human	Lauren	Episode: "Pilot"
2008	Raw	Rebecca Marsh	6 episodes
2009	The Philanthropist	Bella Olazabal	The Bella Olazabal character was apparently dropped from The Philanthropist before it was aired.
2011–2012	Hell on Wheels	Lily Bell	Main cast (seasons 1–2); 20 episodes
2015	The Astronaut Wives Club	Louise Shepard	Main cast; 10 episodes
2016–2017	House of Cards	Hannah Conway	Recurring role (season 4); Main cast (season 5); 15 episodes
2016–2017	The Last Tycoon	Kathleen Moore	Main cast; 9 episodes
2019–2022	The Boys	Maggie Shaw / Queen Maeve	Main cast; 22 episodes
2022	The Boys Presents: Diabolical	Maggie Shaw / Queen Maeve	Voice; episode: "I'm Your Pusher"
