= Anson Mount =

American actor (born 1973)

- Mount in 2026
- Born: February 25, 1973 (age 53); Arlington Heights, Illinois, U.S.
- Education: University of the South (BA); Columbia University (MFA)
- Occupation: Actor
- Years active: 1999–present
- Spouse: Darah Trang (m. 2018)
- Children: 2

Anson Adams Mount IV (born February 25, 1973) is an American actor. He became known for his television roles on the western drama series Hell on Wheels (2011–2016) and Conviction (2006). He also starred in various films including Crossroads (2002) and Cook County (2009).

He gained recognition for his role as Black Bolt in the Marvel Cinematic Universe (MCU) media franchise series Inhumans (2017), a role he went on to reprise in Doctor Strange in the Multiverse of Madness (2022). He has since portrayed Captain Christopher Pike in the Star Trek franchise beginning with the television series Star Trek: Discovery.

== Early life ==
Mount's father, Anson Adams Mount II, was one of the original contributing editors to Playboy magazine. His mother, Nancy Smith, is a former professional golfer. From his father's first marriage, Mount has an older brother (Anson Adams Mount III) and two sisters.

Mount attended Dickson County High School in Dickson, Tennessee, Sewanee: The University of the South, and Columbia University.

== Career ==
=== Stage ===
In 1998, Mount starred in Terrence McNally's Corpus Christi, for which he was honored by the Drama League.

In 2008, he was a finalist for the American Playwrights Conference at the O'Neill Center in 2008 for his full-length play Atomic City, and won the Maxim Mazumdar New Play Prize for his one-act play Love Liza? In 2010 he appeared in Anton Chekhov's Three Sisters at Classic Stage Company. In 2018 he appeared in Robert O'Hara's Mankind at Playwrights Horizons.

=== Film ===
Mount made his feature film debut in 2000 as Tully Coats in the independent film Tully.

In 2009, he produced and starred in the independent film Cook County, which earned awards at several major film festivals, including Hollywood, AFI Dallas, Nashville and SXSW.

In 2022, Mount portrayed Black Bolt in the Marvel Cinematic Universe (MCU) film Doctor Strange in the Multiverse of Madness, reprising his role from 2017's Inhumans.

=== Television ===
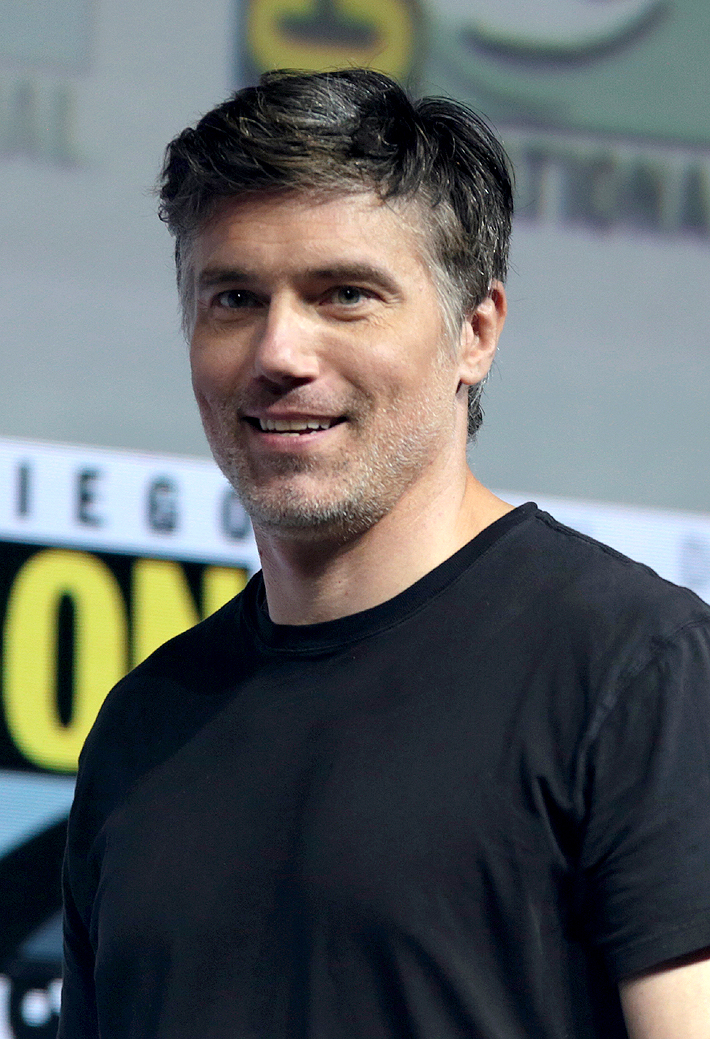
Mount at the 2018 San Diego Comic-Con.

Mount is known for his role as Cullen Bohannon on AMC's series Hell on Wheels, which he also produced from 2014 to 2016.

In 2017, he starred as Black Bolt in the Marvel Cinematic Universe (MCU) ABC television series Inhumans.

In 2018, he was cast as Captain Christopher Pike of the Starship Enterprise in the CBS series Star Trek: Discovery. His performance was well received, and inspired a petition for a Pike spin-off series. In 2019, he reprised his role as Pike in a few Star Trek: Short Treks episodes. In May 2020, it was announced that, due in part to fans' requests, he would return as Pike in the new series Star Trek: Strange New Worlds, which premiered on May 5, 2022.

=== Academic ===
Mount is an adjunct assistant professor at Columbia University, teaching audition technique for graduate actors.

His non-fiction pieces have been published in the magazines Mosaic, The Daily Beast and Cowboys & Indians, and in the Calgary Herald newspaper.

== Personal life ==
On July 8, 2017, Mount announced his engagement to his longtime girlfriend, photographer Darah Trang. They were married on February 20, 2018, and have a daughter, who was born in December 2021. He is an Episcopalian.

He is also a member of the board of directors of METI International.

== Credits ==
=== Film ===
Year	Title	Role	Notes
2000	Urban Legends: Final Cut	Toby Belcher	
2000	Tully	Tully Coates Jr.	
2000	Boiler Room	Broker	
2002	Crossroads	Ben Kimble	Nominated – Golden Raspberry Award for Worst Screen Combo (shared with Britney Spears); Nominated – Teen Choice Award for Best Chemistry (shared with Britney Spears)
2002	City by the Sea	Dave Simon	
2002	Poolhall Junkies	Chris	
2003	The Battle of Shaker Heights	Miner Weber	
2004	The Warrior Class	Alec Brno	
2005	In Her Shoes	Todd	
2006	All the Boys Love Mandy Lane	Garth	
2006	Walk the Talk	Larry	
2006	Hood of Horror	Tex Jr	
2007	Privacy Policy	Detective Barry	
2008	The Two Mr. Kissels	Robert Kissel	TV movie
2009	Cook County	Bump	
2009	Burning Palms	Tom	
2011	Straw Dogs	Coach Stan Milkens	
2011	Hick	Nick	
2012	Safe	Alex Rosen	
2012	Seal Team Six: The Raid on Osama Bin Laden	Cherry	TV movie
2014	Non-Stop	Jack Hammond	
2014	The Forger	Keegan	
2014	Supremacy	Paul Sobecki	
2015	Mr. Right	Richard Cartigan	
2015	Visions	David Maddox	
2021	The Virtuoso	The Virtuoso	
2021	Injustice	Bruce Wayne / Batman	Voice
2022	Doctor Strange in the Multiverse of Madness	Blackagar Boltagon / Black Bolt (Earth-838)	
2022	MK Ultra	Ford Strauss	
2026	Batman: Knightfall – Part 1: Knightfall	Bruce Wayne / Batman	Voice
2026	Batman: Knightfall – Part 2: Knightquest	Bruce Wayne / Batman	Voice

=== Television ===
Year	Title	Role	Notes
1999	Ally McBeal	Kevin Wah	Episode: "Civil War"
1999	Sex and the City	Gregory	Episode: "Twenty-Something Girls vs. Thirty-Something Women"
2000–2001	Third Watch	Dr. Montville	5 episodes
2003	Smallville	Paul Hayden	Episode: "Precipice"
2003-2004	Line of Fire	Roy Ravelle	13 episodes
2004	CSI: Miami	Tony Macken	Episode: "Not Landing"
2004–2005	The Mountain	Will Carver	13 episodes
2005	Lost	Kevin	Episode: "Man of Science, Man of Faith"
2006	Conviction	Jim Steele	
2007	Law & Order	Reverend James Sterling	Episode: "Church"
2007	The Cure	Darren Elliot	
2009	Dollhouse	Vitas	Episode: "Gray Hour"
2011–2016	Hell On Wheels	Cullen Bohannon	Lead role; 55 episodes
2013	Red Widow	Evan Walraven	3 episodes
2017	Inhumans	Black Bolt	Lead role; 8 episodes
2019	Star Trek: Discovery	Captain Christopher Pike	Series regular; 14 episodes
2019–2023	The Ready Room	Himself	4 episodes
2019	Star Trek: Short Treks	Captain Christopher Pike	3 episodes
2021–2022	Dota: Dragon's Blood	Kaden	Voice role; 12 episodes
2022–present	Star Trek: Strange New Worlds	Captain Christopher Pike	Main role; 40 episodes Nominated—Saturn Award for Best Actor in a Streaming Series (2022); Nominated—Saturn Award for Best Actor in a Television Series (2024)

=== Theater ===
Year	Production	Theater	Role
1998	Cymbeline	Delacorte Theater	Iachimo/Jupiter
1998	Cymbeline	Delacorte Theater	Frenchman/Roman Captain
1998	Corpus Christi	New York City Center/ Stage I	Joshua
1998	The Caucasian Chalk Circle	La MaMa E.T.C.	
2002	Elle	Zipper Theatre	photographer
2008	Glengarry Glen Ross	Macha Theater	Richard Roma
2009	Mourning Becomes Electra	Acorn Theater	Captain Adam Brant
2010	Fifth of July	Bay Street Theatre	Kenneth Talley Jr.
2011	Three Sisters	East 13th Street/CSC Theatre	Solyony
2013	Venus in Fur	Singapore Repertory Theatre-DBS Arts Centre	Thomas
2018	Mankind	Playwrights Horizons	Mark

=== As producer/director/writer ===
Year	Production	type	Producer/Director/Writer	Awards
2008	Cook County	film	Producer/starring	Dallas International Film Festival 2008 Special Jury Prize Hollywood Film Awards 2008 Hollywood Discovery Award - Best Feature Film Nashville Film Festival 2008 Best of Festival Award - Honorable Mention The SXSW Film Awards 2008 The Audience Award Sidewalk Film Festival 2008 Best Feature Film
2008	Atomic City	theater	Dramaturg/playwright	
2009	In Stereo	short	Producer	
2011	Love Liza?	theater	Playwright	Maxim Mazumdar New Play Prize
2013	Last Time We Checked	short	Executive producer/Director/Writer	
2015–2016	Hell on Wheels	TV	Producer	Alberta Film & Television Awards 2015; Rosie Awards: Best Dramatic Series; Alberta Film & Television Awards 2016; Rosie Awards: Best Dramatic Series

=== Podcast ===
Mount writes, produces, and hosts The Well podcast with his longtime friend Branan Edgens. He has served as a narrator on the Pseudopod podcast, reading the Thomas Ligotti story "The Town Manager".

=== Video games ===
Year	Title	Voice role	Notes
2014	The Evil Within	Sebastian Castellanos	
2015	The Assignment (DLC)	Sebastian Castellanos	Cameo
