= Range War (Hell on Wheels) =

- Hell on Wheels episode
- Episode no.: Season 3 Episode 3
- Directed by: Dennie Gordon
- Written by: Mark Richard; Reed Steiner
- Production code: 303
- Original air date: August 17, 2013

Episode chronology
← Previous "Eminent Domain"	Next → "The Game"
- Hell on Wheels (season 3)

"Range War" is the third episode of the third season of the American television drama series Hell on Wheels, which aired on August 17, 2013 on AMC. The twenty-third episode of the series is co-written by Mark Richard and Reed Steiner and directed by Dennie Gordon. In the episode, when his railroad crew is attacked, Cullen Bohannon (Anson Mount) first suspects the natives but learns Thomas Durant (Colm Meaney) might be behind it. Declan Toole (Damian O'Hare) arrives in town to claim Eva (Robin McLeavy) and her baby to honor his brother's memory and Irish custom. The Swede (Christopher Heyerdahl), now calling himself "Mr. Anderson," helps a stranded family.

== Plot ==
Cullen and his work crew re-set downed telegraph poles. A man approaches on the tracks via a handcar to reveal he has a scalped head. He says Indians have killed five railroad men and stolen 300 head of cattle. Cullen telegraphs the fort with the message to pursue and kill Indians and show no mercy. He and Elam (Common) then ride off in search of the Indian raiders.

Back in town, the scalped cattle wrangler repeats the events to anyone who pays a nickel for his tale. Louise Ellison (Jennifer Ferrin) listens in, although he changes his story each time. After hearing a woman scream, she enters the prostitutes' tents. Eva tends to a bleeding woman. Mickey McGinnes (Phil Burke) tells Eva that his whorehouse is not a hospital, but a place of business. When Louise calls him a pimp, he says she doesn't understand their world at Hell on Wheels.

Cullen and Elam find a horse that's been painted — not dyed — and realize that their cattle were not stolen by Indians, but white men. From a hill, they watch a group of drunk and sleeping rustlers camped by the river. Cullen tells Elam to not kill them all. They rush the campsite, shooting all the men but one. He tells Cullen that he doesn't know where the cattle are, but the plan was to get paid out of Omaha. Cullen suspects Durant is behind all this. Elam shoots the rustler dead when he tries to run.

Declan Toole arrives via train at Hell on Wheels. He enters the saloon and introduces himself to Mickey as Gregory Toole's (Duncan Ollerenshaw) brother. Declan asks Mickey for information about his brother's death.

Carrying the rustler's corpse, Cullen kicks open the door to an Omaha restaurant. He drops the corpse at Durant's table and pulls up a chair. He accuses Durant of hiring men to kill his crew and steal his cattle. The sheriff enters and supports Durant, then tells Cullen to leave. Cullen leaves the body at Durant's table. Outside, he tells Elam they need to telegraph the fort and call off Bendix (Leon Ingulsrud). Maggie Palmer (Chelah Horsdal), a rancher in negotiations with Durant, introduces herself to Cullen. She offers him a good deal for her cattle, foreseeing a future range war that Cullen's railroad is about to breach.

Eva continues tending to the sick prostitute while Louise watches. She asks about Eva's past as a prostitute. Eva says Elam and Toole helped her survive it. She blames herself for Toole's death and believe things are now cursed. That night, Declan knocks on Eva's tent. He's come for her and the baby — it's Irish custom to marry a brother's widow. She closes the door in his face.

The Swede (Christopher Heyerdahl), now calling himself "Mr. Anderson," repairs a family's wagon axle. He thanks them for providing food and shelter, then grieves over his own family, who he says have been killed by Indians. He later leads a prayer before a meal with the traveling family.

In town, Cullen orders Sean McGinnes (Ben Esler) to send railroad stock to Maggie as payment for the cattle. He then tells Sean that Durant sends his regards. Major Bendix and his troops ride into town carrying poles with piked Indian heads. Cullen reminds him of his redacted orders, but Bendix says he's just hastening the end of the war with the Indians. Cullen later warns him that the Indians will now retaliate. Bendix claims the Indians need to be wiped out. Cullen tells him to fight the war and Cullen will build the railroad. Outside, Sean tells Cullen that Indians have attacked the surveyors. He warns Sean not to tell anyone, then instructs him to request more soldiers. Cullen and Elam bury the dead surveyors then go to the saloon. Declan enters and confronts Elam about Eva and the baby. He wants to take them back to New York, but Elam forbids it, warning Declan to stay away from his family.

Cullen brings Ruth food in the church. He admits innocent people have died at his hand. Ruth tells him killing is a sin, but adds Cullen can be redeemed if he hates his sin, even if he can't turn away from it.

Walking through a field, Durant and Maggie discuss plans for their railroad city. Elsewhere, Cullen places the severed Indian heads on a sacred burial platform.

== Reception ==
=== Ratings ===
"Range War" was watched by 1.88 million viewers and received a 0.5 rating among viewers aged 18 to 49.

=== Critical reception ===
TV Fanatic's Sean McKenna gave the episode a 4.4 out of 5 stars, stating "where 'Big Bad Wolf/Eminent Domain' was the slow start of setting everyone back on the track of building the railroad, the third episode provided the beginnings of some real conflict and story direction for the characters, all with some cool action, slow-mo shots and a little much needed humor."
