= Hell on Wheels season 5 =

Hell on Wheels
- Season 5
- Region 1 DVD cover for Vol. 1 and Vol. 2
- Showrunner: John Wirth
- No. of episodes: 14

Release
- Original network: AMC
- Original release: July 18, 2015 – July 23, 2016

Season chronology
- ← Previous; Season 4

The fifth and final season of the AMC television series Hell on Wheels premiered on July 18, 2015 and comprised 14 episodes. The season was evenly split; the first half aired in late 2015, and the second half aired in mid-2016. This season, set in California and Laramie, Wyoming, focused on the race to complete America's First transcontinental railroad, as Cullen Bohannon switched from working with the Union Pacific to the Central Pacific Railroad, upon the CP developer's promise to help find Cullen's family.

== Cast ==
=== Main cast ===
The fifth season features 13 series regulars; with Tim Guinee, Byron Mann, Reg Rogers, Angela Zhou, and Chelah Horsdal added to the main cast.

- Anson Mount as Cullen Bohannon, a former Confederate soldier, who worked with the Union Pacific Railroad but switched to the Central Pacific, upon Collis Huntington's promise to help find Cullen's family (13 episodes)
- Colm Meaney as Thomas C. Durant, whose Union Pacific railroad is in a race to lay more track than the rival Central Pacific (10 episodes)
- Christopher Heyerdahl as Thor "The Swede" Gundersen, who works for both Cullen and the Mormons and, yet, still maintains a hidden agenda (8 episodes)
- Robin McLeavy as Eva, a former Indian captive and prostitute, turned madam for Mickey McGinnes (9 episodes)
- Jennifer Ferrin as Louise Ellison, a journalist and editor of The Cheyenne Leader newspaper, who investigates the swindling of the railroad (7 episodes)
- Phil Burke as Mickey McGinnes, the owner of a casino and whorehouse, and Mayor of Cheyenne (8 episodes)
- Dohn Norwood as Psalms Jackson, head of a skeleton crew of Freedmen who are pressured to beat the Union Pacific's rivals (5 episodes)
- Tim Guinee as Collis Huntington, developer of the Central Pacific Railroad and Cullen's new employer (10 episodes)
- Byron Mann as Chang, labor contractor for the Central Pacific Railroad (9 episodes)
- Reg Rogers as James Strobridge, construction superintendent for the Central Pacific Railroad (8 episodes)
- MacKenzie Porter as Naomi Hatch Bohannon, Cullen Bohannon's wife, who struggles to build a new life, family, and home and is awakening her own desire to experience adventures beyond the Mormon fort (4 episodes)
- Angela Zhou as Fong/Mei, a Chinese worker for the Central Pacific Railroad. Originally disguised as Tao's son, Fong, she is discovered by Cullen to be a woman named Mei. (9 episodes)
- Chelah Horsdal as Maggie Palmer, the richest woman in Cheyenne and owner of the Palmer Hotel, who is often at odds with Durant (5 episodes)

=== Recurring cast ===
- Josh Caras as Phineas Howe Young, Brigham Young's son, who leads the Mormon work crew under the influence of Thor Gundersen (7 episodes)
- Tzi Ma as Tao, head of the Chinese crew for the Central Pacific Railroad (6 episodes)
- Andrew Howard as Johnny Shea, Mickey's Irish cousin from New York, who is made railroad foreman (3 episodes)
- Jennifer Lim as Wai-Ling, Chang's enslaved wife who works in his brothel (3 episodes)
- Amber Chardae Robinson as Mary Fields, stagecoach driver (3 episodes)
- Victor Slezak as President Ulysses S. Grant (3 episodes)
- Jake Weber as John Allen Campbell, a former Brigadier General for the Union Army, appointed provisional governor of Wyoming by Ulysses S. Grant. Campbell is determined to civilize the West and seize control of the city from railroad mogul Durant. (3 episodes)
- Gregg Henry as Brigham Young, the leader of the Mormons (2 episodes)
- Toby Hemingway as Isaac Vinson, a farmhand for the Hatches. In Cullen's absence, Naomi has fallen in love with him. (2 episodes)
- Andy Yu as Hoi, a Chinese worker who was the first to give his life for the railroad after Cullen's decision to switch from traditional gunpowder to nitroglycerin. (2 episodes)

== Production ==
On November 7, 2014, AMC renewed Hell On Wheels for a fifth and final season, consisting of 14 episodes, which premiered July 18, 2015. AMC also announced the season would be split into two parts, with half the episodes to air in 2015 and the other half beginning July 2016. About the season, showrunner John Wirth stated: "The end of the story is written down in history, so we know how the story would end for the railroad." He added: "What we didn't know is how the story would end for each of our characters, especially the ones that we created. It's been really challenging to wrap up people's stories in a satisfying way [...] We've gone down a lot of blind alleys and we've taken a lot of wrong turns and we've lost our way. Now, we've kind of clawed our way back to what I think is going to be a pretty good wrap up for the series."

The fifth season's production filming took place on the CL Ranch, west of Calgary, for the Truckee, California, and Laramie, Wyoming, locations. The Kananaskis Country park system, 40 miles west of the ranch, serves as the Sierra Nevada mountains the Central Pacific Railroad must cross.

== Episodes ==
No. overall	No. in season	Title	Directed by	Written by	Original release date	Prod. code	US viewers (millions)
Part 1
44	1	"Chinatown"	David Straiton	Jami O'Brien	July 18, 2015	501	2.07
Cullen visits Collis Huntington in Truckee, California, to lay out a plan for the Central Pacific Railroad to traverse into Nevada and Utah to meet the Union Pacific. Huntington pays him to start tracking down "fresh Chinamen" for hire. Cullen enlists help from restaurant owner Chang (Byron Mann), Tao, and his son, Fong. Huntington later shows Cullen a telegram that Naomi and family have been banned from all Mormon settlements. The Swede arrives to tell Cullen that Brigham Young was a "false prophet" and that Cullen is a devil sent to test him. Regardless of their history, Cullen hires the Swede to work for the Central Pacific.
45	2	"Mei Mei"	Billy Gierhart	John Wirth & Thomas Brady	July 25, 2015	502	1.55
Cullen and Fong have difficulty working in the Sierra Nevadas, where Cullen discovers Fong is actually a woman named Mei. The Swede works for both the Central Pacific and the Mormons to get boots for the California workers. Cullen returns Mei back to her father, but keeps her secret safe.
46	3	"White Justice"	David Straiton	John Romano	August 1, 2015	503	1.67
After Cullen and Tao save Chang from some slighted American workers who attempt to hang him, Chang seeks justice but must abide by American law. He is later told the men will not stand trial. Mei heals from her injuries and seeks to return to work on the railroad, as she is hiding as Fong from a promised marriage in China. The Swede points out some errors in the Mormon financial ledgers, causing Brigham Young's son Phineas and the California workers to ponder rebellion.
47	4	"Struck"	Clark Johnson	Max Hurwitz	August 8, 2015	504	2.00
Chang succeeds in organizing a strike among the Chinese workers, as the men who attempted to hang him are taken by wagon out of town. Cullen is able to negotiate for some but not all of the Chinese demands. In Laramie, Wyoming, Thomas Durant notes the Central Pacific's progress has increased with Cullen's help. Durant assigns Mickey's cousin, Shea, as his new foreman.
48	5	"Elixir of Life"	Karen Gaviola	Michael Saltzman	August 15, 2015	505	1.90
Chang and Cullen arrive in Truckee with more Chinamen to employ and items for a festival. It is then that Cullen informs Chang that Tao is taking over the payroll. In Laramie, Louise Ellison enlists Eva's help with her abortion. Maggie Palmer arrives, furious with Durant proclaiming Laramie, rather than Cheyenne, to be the hub. Durant promises to revert his decision. In Truckee, Cullen investigates the Swede's receiving rifles in rice crates as Chang allows Tao to be shot dead.
49	6	"Hungry Ghosts"	Neil LaBute	Jami O'Brien & Miki Johnson	August 22, 2015	506	1.59
Cullen travels with Mei who intends to take Tao's body home. Their train gets delayed on the tracks so they set off on a different path, only to face danger at a river. Brigham Young arrives in Laramie, insisting that Durant pays him for the Mormon workers. As Durant and Maggie hatch a plan, Young speaks with Eva, who reveals her Mormon upbringing. Louise is determined to interview Young, who stated that Salt Lake City will be the hub for both railroads. Upon learning of Durant's shady dealings with Young, she writes an article calling the railroads the "greatest swindle" of the time.
50	7	"False Prophets"	Rod Lurie	John Romano & Thomas Brady	August 29, 2015	507	1.85
All interested railroad parties arrive in Salt Lake City to meet with President Grant, who believes the Transcontinental Railroad program is in chaos. The Swede and Phineas arrive to speak with Young, who is short with them. Cullen promises Young to push for the hub to be in the city if Young tells him where Cullen's family is. At a meeting, it's suggested that Promontory, Utah, be the terminus. Cullen states that there shouldn't be one and that the race should be for Ogden. Meanwhile, The Swede and Phineas plot to assassinate Young, which is subterfuge for The Swede to learn the location of Cullen's family.
Part 2
51	8	"Two Soldiers"	Michael Nankin	John Wirth & Thomas Brady	June 11, 2016	508	1.78
In 1863, Confederate soldiers raid a Union camp, and Thor "The Swede" Gundersen, among others, is captured and taken to Andersonville Prison. The conditions there cause Thor's friend to start chewing on him. In an attempt to save himself, Thor drowns his friend in a mud puddle. Years later, The Swede finds his way to the Hatch farm, kills Naomi's father and sister, and stalks her and baby William into the woods. Cullen, though, is not far behind. However, The Swede shoots him in the leg and they struggle in a river. Cullen has the opportunity to drown him but doesn't, after seeing him smile from underwater. Against Naomi's wishes, he takes him on a two-day journey to Fort Douglas, a military garrison, for trial. The perilous trek weakens Cullen, and the two men fight before reaching the fort. Cullen manages to shoot The Swede in the side and fire shots in the air to bring soldiers. Four days later, The Swede has been found guilty of the Hatch deaths and is scheduled to hang. He pleads instead for justice and forgiveness from Cullen but is led to his gallows death as Cullen watches.
52	9	"Return to the Garden"	Marvin V. Rush	Jami O'Brien	June 18, 2016	509	1.49
Cullen returns to the Hatch farm to be with his family, only to realize that, in the time he has been away, Naomi has fallen in love with farmhand Isaac Vinson (Toby Hemingway). Isaac informs him that he, Naomi, and William will be moving to Zion (Salt Lake Valley), if Brigham Young will welcome them. Cullen promises to escort them and speak with Young. Upon arrival, Young considers Cullen an apostate for returning the "gifts" God has given him to die "a lonely, wretched thing". Cullen manages to get Young agree on blessing Naomi and Isaac's wedding, then leaves Naomi and William. In Laramie, the residents are upset at Durant over the news of Cheyenne's being made a railroad hub. He blames the railroad board and agrees to buy their land back at 10 cents an acre above the going rate. He also asks Mickey for more Irish workers, but Mickey wants railroad shares in return. Durant initially refuses, but Maggie later assures him that he needs Mickey. Meanwhile, Mei returns to Truckee, despondent over the loss of her father and news that Cullen is with his family. However, Cullen returns, and they share a passionate kiss.
53	10	"61 Degrees"	Michael Nankin	Max Hurwitz	June 25, 2016	510	1.51
After spending the night together, Cullen and Mei (as Fong) return to work on the railroad. There is tunnel work to be done, and Cullen suggests using nitroglycerin to do the blasting. James Strobridge teaches the Chinese how to make blasting caps. In Laramie, Durant proposes marriage to Maggie, who says she'll never remarry but will stay with him, if Durant promises no more schemes. They must then deal with an angry mob wanting payment. Durant and Mickey later plot a fake kidnapping to get $250,000 ransom money from the railroad board; Durant will pay Mickey $25,000 for organizing it. Mickey has Shea lead the kidnapping, which goes awry when Shea kills the chief engineer, and then nearly kills Louise, until Durant speaks up. Following the death of a tunnel worker mishandling the nitroglycerine, Cullen suggests they continue to use the explosive, but that he and James will clear future blasts. James refuses to participate and is fired from the railroad. The tunnel is later completed, and Chang becomes suspicious when he catches Cullen exiting Fong's tent.
54	11	"Gambit"	Adam Davidson	John Romano & Miki Johnson	July 2, 2016	511	1.43
A flash-forward to 1885 shows Durant dying a lonely, poor, and forgotten man. In the present, Mickey and Durant's kidnapping plot hits a snag, when Governor Campbell arrives with cavalry to bring the men responsible to justice. Mickey mentions to Eva his concern that Shea is unstable; she suggests killing him, despite him being family. Mickey and Shea give Campbell an ultimatum in the form of a booby trap: pay the money, or Durant dies. Campbell wires for the money but later balks when he suspects Durant is part of the plot. Maggie puts her own money together and rides to find Durant. She is shot and killed when Shea is dissatisfied with the amount. He turns to shoot Durant, but Mickey shoots his cousin, killing him. Back in town, Shea is considered escaped, Campbell must absolve Durant without proof, and Eva consoles a forlorn Mickey.
55	12	"Any Sum Within Reason"	Tim Southam	Thomas Brady	July 9, 2016	512	1.72
Fearful that Chang knows Mei's secret, Cullen sends her to Cheyenne. Cullen then suggests Huntington remove the Chinese from the railroad construction and hire Irishmen to finish. Huntington counters by saying China is the future, and Cullen should think beyond completing the railroad. Cullen then tries to buy Mei's contract from Chang, who refuses, stating Cullen rejected his previous offer to own a share of the railroad. Cullen gets a telegraph from Mei, who is in Washoe City, Nevada. However, Chang arrives before he does, and Cullen must kill him and the group who came with him. Mei tells Cullen that she will still be hunted and doesn't want that life for him. While he manages to dissuade a Chinese general from looking for her, she leaves to return to China but writes him a note in Chinese.
56	13	"Railroad Men"	Jeremy Webb	John Wirth & Thomas Brady	July 16, 2016	513	1.60
Louise narrates each railroad's historical accomplishments and challenges as both now race toward Ogden. The Union Pacific has ten miles left, while the Central Pacific has only six, and Strobridge has taken both the Irish and Chinese workers in as miners. Mickey manages to convince his countrymen to return to railroad work, while Cullen fails to convince the Chinese. Huntington tries to swindle Governor Campbell into proclaiming him the victor, but Campbell states that Grant's presidency will be "free from corruption". Within the last few miles, the Chinese return to help Cullen, while Durant's urgings cause Psalms and the freedmen to switch teams. The Central Pacific reaches the end marker first. Durant and Huntington bicker over who owns Ogden's hub, and Huntington cedes, upon the promise that the coming ceremony will be held on the CP side. After evading Louise's questions about his future, Cullen drunkenly collapses in his train car, reflecting on all that he has lost.
57	14	"Done"	David Von Ancken	Jami O'Brien & Thomas Brady	July 23, 2016	514	1.65
Following the golden spike ceremony, both Durant and Cullen are given summonses to appear before Congress in Washington, D.C. Durant has been charged with bribery, fraud, and corruption. Cullen asks a Chinese worker to translate Mei's note: it's an address in China. Eva declines Louise's book deal offer, her "survivor story", saying that she is "done whoring". In Washington, President Grant offers Cullen a position as army colonel and undersecretary for the western territories. Cullen states that he is a railroad man, to which Grant counters that he is a soldier "without a war to fight". Dressed in his Union Army uniform before Congressmen, Cullen refuses to implicate Durant, repeating that their railroad could not have been built without Durant. Cullen then goes to the church where he killed a man in the first episode, and a priest asks if he seeks salvation. Cullen breaks down, thanks him, and leaves. Despite Durant's lawyer's invoking the Fifth Amendment, his client defiantly describes the future that he has wrought for them. As Durant speaks, Mickey departs for San Francisco, Eva rides her horse into the sunset, and Cullen boards a train, leaving his uniform behind. He disembarks in San Francisco and boards a ship for China to be reunited with Mei.

The finale was followed by two additional bonus specials, on July 24, 2016, on AMC, titled "Series Wrap-Up" and "Inside the Final Episode".
