= Eminent Domain (Hell on Wheels) =

- Hell on Wheels episode
- Episode no.: Season 3 Episode 2
- Directed by: Adam Davidson
- Written by: John Wirth
- Production code: 302
- Original air date: August 10, 2013

Episode chronology
← Previous "Big Bad Wolf"	Next → "Range War"
- Hell on Wheels (season 3)

"Eminent Domain" is the second episode of the third season of the American television drama series Hell on Wheels, which aired on August 10, 2013, on AMC. The twenty-second episode of the series is written by showrunner John Wirth and directed by Adam Davidson. In the episode, the railroad progress is interrupted by a family of Mormons in its path. When a family member kills Dick Barlow (Matthew Glave), the railroad's chief engineer, Cullen Bohannon (Anson Mount) seeks justice. Louise Ellison (Jennifer Ferrin), a New-York Tribune reporter, arrives in town to witness it all.

== Plot ==
Cullen gives Louise, who's writing a story about the First transcontinental railroad, a tour of the town. He claims he doesn't need Thomas C. Durant's (Colm Meaney) help in the race against the Central Pacific Railroad. She asks where Lily Bell is buried. Cullen replies Lily is in a wildflower field, adding that Hell on Wheels is no place for a lady. Elam Ferguson (Common) meets Dick Bartlow, who says Elam now works for him.

Three armed riders enter town and order Cullen to keep the railroad off their property. Cullen rides to a nearby farm and meets Aaron Hatch (James Shanklin), a Mormon, and his family. Hatch invites him to dinner, during which he insists his family is not moving. Cullen says he'll try to find a route around the farm, but the family will have to move if none can be found. Cullen spends the night and, in the barn, he and the eldest daughter, Naomi (Siobhan Williams), begin to kiss. Her inquisitive younger brother Henry (Christian Laurian-Kerr) interrupts them.

The next day, Cullen is told an alternate route can be built but would put them five weeks behind schedule. Back in town, Sean McGinnes (Ben Esler), the railroad's new bookkeeper, tells Cullen that Durant has cancelled the livestock contracts and cornered the market. An angry Cullen says he should have killed Durant long ago. Louise overhears this. Later in the church, Cullen tells Ruth Cole (Kasha Kropinski) about the Hatch family situation. She cautions that Mormons are a "violent people."

In Omaha, Nebraska, Durant dines with some ranchers, one of which is a woman whom he proposes building a commercial railroad terminus on her land. As a representative of Crédit Mobilier, he offers $100 per acre to prevent the railroad from claiming eminent domain. At the bar, he is joined by Sean, who slips him an envelope stuffed with money and the Union Pacific telegraph routing code. Durant can now eavesdrop on Cullen. Sensing Sean's unease, Durant assures him that he's not doing anything wrong. At Hell on Wheels, Louise is cornered by a large, drunk worker, who forces himself on her. She slashes his face with a razor and he strikes her.

The next day, Elam and Dick have breakfast together. Cullen arrives and instructs them to ride out and order the Mormons off their land. At the Hatch farm, Dick approaches the boarded-up house. He hears Hatch yell that, again, the family isn't leaving. Dick is shot in the stomach. Elam drags him away and rides back to town with him draped over the horse. Elam tells Cullen he doesn't know who fired the shot. Eva declares Dick has no chance of surviving. Dick asks to see Elam's baby. declaring her beautiful as Elam had described. Dick dies and Cullen places his police badge on Elam's vest. Elam says he didn't want the job in this manner.

Cullen, Elam, Louise and a cavalry arrive at the farm with a writ of execution. Hatch and his two sons approach the railroad group with weapons. Cullen tells Hatch that he must be accountable for the murder. After Hatch insists his family will not survive without him, Cullen assures him they'll be taken to a Mormon settlement. Hatch grabs his eldest son, Jeb (Ben Sullivan), and says the boy killed Dick. A reluctant Jeb agrees with his father and is hanged as his family watches. Hatch tells Cullen that he now owes him a life. Cullen rides off and stakes the property for the railroad. Later, Louise composes her newspaper story, writing that the railroad business has always involved unscrupulous and corrupt people, neither of whom Cullen Bohannon seems to be.

== Production ==
In an August 2013 interview, Anson Mount (Cullen Bohannon) discussed the scene with the seemingly young daughter (Siobhan Williams, who is actually 23) in the barn: "The network almost made us cut that [sex] scene out, and we fought for it to stay in. I'm not interested in pure, untainted heroes, just like I'm not that interested in strength. I'm interested in weakness, and I'm interested in what makes somebody human. Just because somebody's had their heart broken doesn't mean that they don't get a hard on every now and then. Okay. It's just realistic. He's out there alone. The only thing he's seen is whores, and half of 'em have syphilis. What's he gonna do?" He added, "The reason the sex is so important in that scene is that he has to hang her brother the next day and he doesn't even question it. He has to get on with the railroad. The law is the law. It makes the killing of that boy much more difficult, but he does it. We also had a scene in that episode in which I was reading to her little sister before she went to bed. We didn't have room for it, unfortunately, but that's the kind of stuff that we were trying to set up to make that ending so much more difficult."

== Reception ==
=== Ratings ===
Seen as the second hour of the third season's premiere, "Eminent Domain" was watched by 2.49 million viewers and received a 0.5 rating among viewers aged 18–49, an increase from the second season's premiere and double the network's Saturday prime time average.

=== Critical reception ===
The A.V. Club's Alasdair Wilkins gave the episode a B− grade, stating "There's certainly some promise in this apparent new direction; if nothing else, the show seems to be more directly about railroads than it ever was in the first two seasons."
