= Hell on Wheels season 3 =

Hell on Wheels
- Season 3
- Region 1 DVD cover art
- Showrunner: John Wirth
- No. of episodes: 10

Release
- Original network: AMC
- Original release: August 10 – October 5, 2013

Season chronology
- ← Previous; Season 2 Next → Season 4

The third season of the AMC television series Hell on Wheels aired from August 10 through October 5, 2013, and consists of 10 episodes. The season follows Cullen Bohannon as he abandons seeking revenge for the deaths of his family in order to continue to drive the westward expansion of Union Pacific Railroad, while battling Thomas "Doc" Durant for control.

== Cast ==
=== Main cast ===
The third season features ten series regulars. Kasha Kropinski and Dohn Norwood are promoted from recurring status, and Jennifer Ferrin is added to the main cast.

- Anson Mount as Cullen Bohannon, a former Confederate soldier, who puts vengeance and his past behind him to serve as head of the Union Pacific Railroad. (10 episodes)
- Colm Meaney as Thomas "Doc" Durant, who fights his way back from prison and political ruin to regain power over the railroad. (10 episodes)
- Common as Elam Ferguson, an emancipated slave, is now the new chief of railroad police, he is engaged to Eva. (10 episodes)
- Christopher Heyerdahl as Thor Gundersen also known as "the Swede", he's being nursed back to health by a family of Mormons after barely surviving a fall from a bridge. (6 episodes)
- Jennifer Ferrin as Louise Ellison, a smart, witty, and flirtatious journalist hired by the New York Sun to cover the "story of the century". (7 episodes)
- Robin McLeavy as Eva Toole (née Oates), a former Indian captive turned whore, is now engaged to Elam. (10 episodes)
- Phil Burke as Mickey McGinnes, the new owner of the whorehouse in Cheyenne. (9 episodes)
- Ben Esler as Sean McGinnes, after finding work as Cullen's railroad accountant, Sean has found his loyalties divided once again after Durant recruits him to work as his spy in Hell on Wheels. (8 episodes)
- Kasha Kropinski as Ruth, after her father's death, she sets down roots as preacher in the burgeoning city of Cheyenne. (10 episodes)
- Dohn Norwood as Psalms, a former slave and criminal, whose prison sentence has been purchased by the railroad. (7 episodes)

=== Recurring cast ===
- Tayden Marks as Ezra Dutson (7 episodes)
- Kira Bradley as Eleanor Dutson (4 episodes)
- Chelah Horsdal as Maggie Palmer (4 episodes)
- Serge Houde as Congressman Oakes Ames (4 episodes)
- Sean Hoy as Joseph Dutson (4 episodes)
- Haysam Kadri as Dutch (4 episodes)
- Damian O'Hare as Declan Toole (3 episodes)
- James Shanklin as Aaron Hatch (3 episodes)
- Tim Guinee as Collis Huntington (2 episodes)
- Siobhan Williams as Naomi Hatch (2 episodes)

== Production ==
On October 29, 2012, AMC renewed Hell On Wheels for a third season, consisting of 10 episodes. The third season premiered August 10, 2013.

Creators Tony and Joe Gayton had stepped down as showrunners, but remained with the series as consulting producers. John Shiban had also stepped down as executive producer, putting the third season renewal on hold until a replacement was found. AMC officially green-lit the third season on December 12, 2012, and announced that John Wirth would serve as the new executive producer.

Wirth stated the third season would "be a western about work — the building of the railroad, the binding of the nation after the Civil War, and the rehabilitation of the men who lived and fought their way through those exploits." He added, "This season we're placing Cullen Bohannon at the center of the show, and taking him away from the revenge motive which propelled him into the series."

=== Exterior filming ===
Filming of the third season was suspended on June 20, part way through the sixth episode, as the location was part of the mandatory evacuation area due to the flooding in southern Alberta. Originally producers had announced a two-day shut down, when only the road to the location was under water. Later on June 21, producers announced that the production hiatus that was scheduled to begin on June 27 would take effect immediately. Anson Mount shared pictures of the flooding of the nearby river and the exterior sets via Twitter on June 20 and 21. In an August 2013 interview, Mount called the situation "precarious," adding, "We had (production assistants) posted along the river with measuring sticks. We were continuing to work through the day until the local government told us we had to leave." Calgary producer Chad Oakes called it "a true defining moment" of his career: "The credit goes to people who gave up their hiatus, worked around the clock, seven days a week, over the long weekend and having their families and kids understanding that this was so critical ... We could not fail. The repercussions of losing not only the season but the whole series was definitely sitting in our laps."

=== Music ===
For the sixth episode of the season, "One Less Mule", series producer and star Anson Mount asked musician Charlie Daniels to create a song to which his Cullen Bohannon and Louise Ellison dance. Daniels wrote and recorded "a little fiddle tune" with acoustic instruments. He said he "imagined somebody in a beer joint in a railroad town back in the 1800s." He called the tune "Hell on Strings."

== Episodes ==
No. overall	No. in season	Title	Directed by	Written by	Original release date	Prod. code	US viewers (millions)
21	1	"Big Bad Wolf"	David Von Ancken	Mark Richard	August 10, 2013	301	2.49
Cullen Bohannon (Anson Mount) attempts to obtain engineer control of the Union Pacific Railroad, while an imprisoned Thomas C. Durant (Colm Meaney) wishes to prevent that. Elam (Common) and Eva (Robin McLeavy) welcome their new baby.
22	2	"Eminent Domain"	Adam Davidson	John Wirth	August 10, 2013	302	2.49
The railroad progress is interrupted by a family of Mormons in its path. When a family member kills the railroad's sheriff (Matthew Glave), Cullen seeks justice. Louise Ellison (Jennifer Ferrin), a New York Tribune reporter, arrives in town to witness it all.
23	3	"Range War"	Dennie Gordon	Mark Richard & Reed Steiner	August 17, 2013	303	1.88
When his railroad crew is attacked, Cullen first suspects the natives but learns Durant might be behind it. Declan Toole (Damian O'Hare) arrives in town to claim Eva and her baby to honor his brother's memory and Irish custom. The Swede (Christopher Heyerdahl), now calling himself "Mr. Anderson," helps a stranded family.
24	4	"The Game"	Adam Davidson	Jami O'Brien	August 24, 2013	304	2.00
Cullen and Elam must travel into Kiowa territory to barter for lumber, only to learn they must play a game of stickball with their own lives at stake. Back in town, Durant arrives to tell Louise of Cullen's murderous past and Eva ponders her and her baby's future. Out on the prairie, the Swede learns the Dutson family is traveling to Fort Smith, where Mr. Dutson will be a bishop.
25	5	"Searchers"	Neil LaBute	Bruce Marshall Romans	August 31, 2013	305	2.20
As storm clouds draw closer to town, Cullen joins Elam in his search for the missing baby; Psalms interrogates Declan Toole for his possible involvement; Eva questions her motherhood; and Durant offers a reward. Meanwhile, the Swede witnesses the Dutson son's baptism.
26	6	"One Less Mule"	David Straiton & Deran Sarafian	John Wirth & Lolis Eric Elie	September 7, 2013	306	2.07
Cullen's railroad job is in jeopardy, as Durant brings the Crédit Mobilier Board, as well as Ulysses S. Grant (Victor Slezak), to town for a competency hearing. Jasper Prescott (Matt Hurley) arrives in town seeking revenge on Cullen for killing his brother. Elam proposes marriage to Eva and she accepts. The Swede kills the Dutson parents.
27	7	"Cholera"	Deran Sarafian	Tom Brady	September 14, 2013	307	1.99
Cullen sets out in search of fresh water when some of his workers, himself included, suffers from cholera. He gets no help from Durant, who has difficulties of his own when Senator Metcalf (Wayne Duvall) threatens to remove him from Crédit Mobilier. Eva makes a decision about her child's future. The Swede poses as Bishop Dutson, telling about the loss of his family to his Fort Smith escort. Ezra Dutson saves both Cullen and the town by leading him to water.
28	8	"It Happened in Boston"	Rosemary Rodriguez	Mark Richard	September 21, 2013	308	2.08
Elam's and Eva's relationship becomes strained, when he learns she gave the baby to Declan. Cullen and Durant ride to Fort Smith to reclaim the deserted workers, but must first have dinner with Collis Huntington (Tim Guinee), owner of the Central Pacific Railroad and the fort. Sean informs Mickey of his plans to confess his past crimes; the revelation to Ruth results in fatal consequences.
29	9	"Fathers and Sins"	Billy Gierhart	John Wirth & Reed Steiner	September 28, 2013	309	2.10
Bohannon's plan for the railroad to reach the nearby town of Cheyenne must continue without him, when he is captured by armed men led by Aaron Hatch and taken to Fort Smith. Elam rallies the railroad workers to resume the construction. Eva mistakes Louise Ellison's concern for her as something more. Ruth questions Mickey about Sean's death, believing it to be senseless.
30	10	"Get Behind the Mule"	Neil LaBute	Mark Richard & Jami O'Brien	October 5, 2013	310	2.49
Cullen is taken before the Mormon bishop, whom he recognizes as the Swede. He is shown mercy, but must marry the pregnant Naomi Hatch. Durant, owning a majority share of the railroad, usurps control. Elam makes a dangerous decision to rescue Cullen on his own.

== Reception ==
Early reviews for the season were generally positive, scoring a 74 out of 100, based on four reviews from Metacritic. Linda Stasi of the New York Post gave the premiere high praise, criticizing only the inclusion of Ellison's reporter character: "What this well-written series does not need is a character whose only job seems to be moving the story along with expository dialogue in the guise of interviews." The New York Times's Mike Hale focused on the relationship between Cullen and Elam: "A prickly alliance founded on mutual respect and constantly threatened by both history and present, unpleasant circumstance, it's more subtle and moving than your average TV bromance and brings out the best in Common and Mr. Mount."

Its two-part season premiere saw an increase in viewers from the second season's premiere and double the network's Saturday prime time average.
