= Hell on Wheels season 4 =

Hell on Wheels
- Season 4
- Region 1 DVD cover art
- Showrunner: John Wirth
- No. of episodes: 13

Release
- Original network: AMC
- Original release: August 2 – November 22, 2014

Season chronology
- ← Previous; Season 3 Next → Season 5

The fourth season of the AMC television series Hell on Wheels premiered on August 2, 2014, and comprised 13 episodes. This season continued to focus on the westward expansion of the Union Pacific Railroad. Conflicts among the government, businesses, ranchers, homesteaders, and the railroad are also depicted, as all of those interests compete with one another for control of Cheyenne, Wyoming, the most important railroad hub in 1867.

== Cast ==
=== Main cast ===
The fourth season features eleven series regulars. Jake Weber and MacKenzie Porter are added to the main cast. Common, who plays Elam Ferguson, is not credited among the main cast until his reappearance in the episode "Bear Man".

- Anson Mount as Cullen Bohannon, a former Confederate soldier, who is imprisoned in a Mormon fort with his pregnant wife, Naomi, and must find a way out from under the Swede (12 episodes)
- Colm Meaney as Thomas C. Durant, who must figure out how to get the railroad moving without Cullen Bohannon, all the while warding off the arrival of big government that threatens to seize control of Cheyenne and his railroad (12 episodes)
- Common as Elam Ferguson, the chief of railroad police who pursued the masked gang who kidnapped Cullen, only to be mauled by a bear on the prairie and left for dead (2 episodes)
- Christopher Heyerdahl as Thor "The Swede" Gundersen, who, after stealing the identity of the patriarch of a Mormon ward, uses his new identity and power as "Bishop" to keep Cullen Bohannon as his personal prisoner (7 episodes)
- Robin McLeavy as Eva, a former Indian captive turned whore, who finds herself homeless, penniless, and alone after giving away her baby to her brother-in-law Declan Toole, and Elam Ferguson goes missing (12 episodes)
- Jennifer Ferrin as Louise Ellison, a journalist and editor of The Cheyenne Leader (daily newspaper) (9 episodes)
- Phil Burke as Mickey McGinnes, the owner of a casino and whorehouse and the honorary Mayor of Cheyenne (11 episodes)
- Dohn Norwood as Psalms Jackson, head of a skeleton crew of freedmen who are leading the charge to break through the mountains holding the railroad's progress at bay (12 episodes)
- Kasha Kropinski as Ruth Cole, a preacher in the burgeoning city of Cheyenne. She finds new purpose as a mother to the Mormon boy Ezra. (8 episodes)
- MacKenzie Porter as Naomi Hatch Bohannon, Cullen Bohannon's wife, who struggles to build a new life, family, and home, awakening her own desire to experience adventures beyond the Mormon fort (7 episodes)
- Jake Weber as John Allen Campbell, a former Brigadier General for the Union Army, appointed provisional governor of Wyoming by Ulysses S. Grant. Campbell is determined to civilize the West and seize control of the city from railroad mogul Durant. (12 episodes)

=== Recurring cast ===
- David Wilson Barnes as Martin Delaney (10 episodes)
- Tayden Marks as Ezra Dutson (7 episodes)
- Kevin Blatch as Judge Webber (7 episodes)
- Billy Wickman as Heckard (6 episodes)
- Kevin Davet as Paddy Quinn (6 episodes)
- Chelah Horsdal as Maggie Palmer (5 episodes)
- Peter Benson as Marshal Jessup (5 episodes)
- James Shanklin as Aaron Hatch (5 episodes)
- Jonathan Scarfe as Sydney Snow (5 episodes)
- Haysam Kadri as Dutch Dufray (5 episodes)
- Michael Tiernan as Treasurer Atwood (4 episodes)
- Kirsten Robek as Mrs. Hatch (4 episodes)
- Gregg Henry as Brigham Young (4 episodes)
- Christian Sloan as Parker (4 episodes)
- Andrew Howard as Johnny Shea (3 episodes)
- Duval Lang as Elder Moss (3 episodes)
- Leon Ingulsrud as Major Bendix (3 episodes)
- Brendan Fletcher as Dultey (3 episodes)
- Sara Canning as Charlotte (3 episodes)
- Tim Guinee as Collis Huntington (2 episodes)
- John Lacy as Virgil Farnsworth (2 episodes)
- Collin Sutton as George Van Dorn (2 episodes)
- Tom Noonan as Reverend Nathaniel Cole (1 episode)

== Production ==
On November 14, 2013, AMC renewed Hell On Wheels for a fourth season, consisting of 13 episodes, which premiered August 2, 2014. About the season, showrunner John Wirth has stated: "The consequences of the stories we told last year will continue to reverberate throughout the season, and fans can expect to see some shocking events that will not only change the lives of our characters, but the landscape of the series as the railroad continues its relentless march westward."

=== Casting ===
This season, MacKenzie Porter plays Naomi Hatch, taking over for Siobhan Williams from the third season, due to Williams' scheduling conflicts with her role on Black Box. Jake Weber joined the cast in April 2014, originally as a character named Harlan Fell, which was changed preseason to John Campbell. In May 2014, Jonathan Scarfe was cast as recurring character Sydney Snow, who introduced himself as Cullen Bohannon's old war friend.

== Awards ==
In 2015, the series won the Western Heritage Award for Outstanding Fictional Drama.

== Episodes ==
No. overall	No. in season	Title	Directed by	Written by	Original release date	Prod. code	US viewers (millions)
31	1	"The Elusive Eden"	Neil LaBute	Mark Richard	August 2, 2014	401	2.42
At Fort Smith, Cullen Bohannon tells Aaron Hatch that he will remain there until Naomi gives birth and the crops are planted. He also warns him about the bishop, whom Bohannon knows is The Swede. After the baby is born, the bishop blocks Cullen's departure, when Cullen states he is taking Naomi and baby William with him. In Cheyenne, Wyoming, Thomas Durant tries to maintain control of both the town and the railroad after a disaster occurs. He also awaits the arrival of the newly appointed governor, John Campbell. Meanwhile, Eva tries to cope with being without both Elam and her child by earning her keep, doing chores for the brothel.
32	2	"Escape From the Garden"	Neil LaBute	Mark Richard	August 9, 2014	402	1.98
When Cullen realizes The Swede has taken the bishop role too far, and will not let him and Naomi leave the fort, he publicly confesses his own past crimes, while also revealing the bishop to not be who he claims to be. In Cheyenne, Campbell arrives with his legislative team to impose law in the town. He also gives reporter Louise Ellison an interview. After Ezra Dutson sets some horses free, Durant scares him by giving him a train pass to Council Bluffs, Iowa, where Durant says Ezra will be placed in an orphanage, fed bread, and beaten daily. However, Durant tells Ruth to be loving to the boy, and she later tears up the train pass. On the way to Cheyenne, Cullen and his family meet Psalms and the crew. Psalms informs Cullen that Elam has not returned from his search for Cullen.
33	3	"Chicken Hill"	Dennie Gordon	John Wirth	August 16, 2014	403	2.17
Cullen and family arrive in Cheyenne. He assaults Marshal Jessup and Heckard when they seem threatening. Cullen then asks Durant for his former chief engineer job, but is denied when Durant states that Cullen is undependable. Psalms offers Cullen a job on the crew and his family a tent to live in. Durant decides to tunnel through a hill that impedes the railroad's progress. He debates the use of another hill with Campbell, who says it will be the future site of the statehouse, unless Durant establishes a structure on it within 24 hours, so Durant has Delaney erect chicken coops on it. Eva loses a game of poker at the casino but thinks the winner cheated. She later exchanges sex for cheating lessons from him. Cullen saves the rail crew when Delaney uses too much blasting powder on the hill, which contains methane-infused shale. Campbell offers to buy sundries for Naomi and later visits their tent to offer Cullen a better-paying job. Cullen declines, telling Naomi that all he has gone through means nothing if the railroad is not finished. Later, Cullen is beaten unconscious by Jessup and Heckard.
34	4	"Reckoning"	Dennie Gordon	Jennifer Cecil	August 23, 2014	404	2.08
Since Delaney nearly caused the deaths of his crew by trying to tunnel into the hill, Cullen takes it upon himself to plot a line of track over it. In town, Naomi faces religious differences with Ruth and later tries to find comfort from her busy husband. Meanwhile, Campbell's men claim eminent domain over the saloon, causing proprietor Mickey McGinnes to put up a fight and land in jail. When Durant refuses to help, Cullen reminds Mickey of coming to this country with nothing yet finding a way to succeed. Eva, without a job, tries to prostitute herself to Durant, who gives her money simply because she is the only one in town he respects. At Fort Smith, Aaron Hatch seeks evidence that The Swede is not Bishop Dutson. The Swede suggests asking Brigham Young to make the final judgement.
35	5	"Life's a Mystery"	David Straiton	Mark Richard & Tom Brady	August 30, 2014	405	1.78
In Juárez, Sydney Snow (Jonathan Scarfe) escapes a lynching by killing the Fuentes Brothers, who had been intent on hanging him. Sydney flees, not noticing Marcos Fuentes (Zak Santiago) survived. Snow arrives in Cheyenne, claiming to be Cullen's war buddy. Although Cullen doesn't remember him, Cullen nonetheless houses Snow and vouches for him with Psalms to work on the crew. Snow divulges to Naomi, to Cullen's chagrin, an old war story where Cullen had killed scores of Union soldiers convalescing in a hospital. Later, Marcos arrives with his men. Snow not only kills Marcos in the general store, he also fires wildly and kills a young boy. When the store clerk confronts Snow, he's also killed. Naomi, hiding with the baby, is found by Snow, who is then stopped by Cullen, who contemplates whether or not to kill them. Meanwhile, Durant elicits Campbell's anger by flattening his government office. A decree stating the site has been approved for a roundhouse is handed to Campbell, who later vows to take over Cheyenne and then the railroad. Brigham Young (Gregg Henry) arrives at Fort Smith. In private, he appears to know The Swede is not Bishop Dutson by asking him about Cullen, Durant, and the railroad, but Young is willing to overlook the charade in order to facilitate the Mormons' expansion of their own railroad. After Jessup insults Mickey in the bar, Mickey later strangles him in an alley. Heckard, hinting to Durant that he and Jessup were lovers and believing Durant is Jessup's killer, attacks Durant viciously in the latter's railcar.
36	6	"Bear Man"	Clark Johnson	Max Hurwitz	September 6, 2014	406	2.15
Two Comanche braves find Elam Ferguson, barely alive, near the carcass of the bear that attacked him. The braves take him back to their village. A Comanche medicine man's wife, Smiling Crow (Michelle Thrush), nurses Elam back to health, even though he loses vision in his left eye and has hallucinations. Elam continually fights a brave called White Feather (Moses Brings Plenty) for ownership of Charlotte (Sara Canning), a white woman brought from a raid whom Elam thinks is Eva. Later, Elam is taken to the village's sweat lodge, where the medicine man unites him and White Feather by blood. Elam is taught how to say his new name, Bear Killer, in Comanche. Jimmy Two Squaws (Brent Briscoe) arrives in the village on business and recognizes Elam, but Elam doesn't recognize him. Although he thinks Elam's mind has been damaged, Jimmy nonetheless tells him that a Cavalry regiment is looking for Charlotte. He also tries to get Elam to go to Cheyenne, but Elam stabs him. Major Bendix and two others escape a Comanche raid with injuries, while Elam and the braves take souvenirs. Later, Charlotte begs Elam to sell her so he can get Eva back. White Feather carries her away, and Elam kills and scalps him, then leaves the village with Charlotte and Jimmy's two wives. Charlotte tries to escape, but he catches her. She accuses him of being an animal, worse than the Comanche, for killing Jimmy. Weeks later, the four arrive at some railroad tracks.
37	7	"Elam Ferguson"	Rod Lurie	Mark Richard & Tom Brady	September 13, 2014	407	2.18
After Psalms suggests Cullen gets his family out of Cheyenne, Cullen finds the beaten Durant in the latter's railcar. Cullen stitches a laceration on Durant's head, then manages to get his signature on a blank railroad letterhead. Cullen advises Durant to not seek revenge for the beating. Cullen then gets Maggie Palmer to sign off on a loan for a steam shovel by producing Durant's signature for collateral. Durant meets with Campbell, who denies ordering Heckard's attack but says he will put Heckard on the next train out of town. On the train, Durant sees Abby, who is returning to Boston because she still grieves for her father, Senator Metcalf. Durant lies to her, saying that he caused her father to commit suicide when Metcalf invested all his money in Durant's railroad. Heckard, who was thrown off the train, ostensibly on Durant's orders, is bludgeoned to death by Durant near the side of the tracks. Elam arrives in town, looking to sell the women as slaves. Campbell seeks to have marksmen kill the seemingly crazed Elam, but Cullen asks for some time to reason with his friend. He reminds Elam of their friendship and history, but nothing can help Elam, not even Eva nor Psalms, neither of whom Elam recognizes. Cullen wrestles with Elam, and is forced to stab and shoot him. Cullen later digs Elam's grave alone, afterwards wailing in grief.
38	8	"Under Color of Law"	Michael Nankin	John Romano	September 20, 2014	408	2.02
In the middle of the night, Naomi wakes up and realizes Cullen is missing. She searches for him in Cheyenne and is harassed by two drunks, but eventually finds him working on parts for the arriving steam shovel. She mentions his needing rest, and he sends her back to the tent. He later shows Delaney and Durant his plans on how to reach the mountain summit, but he needs men to refit the shovel. Delaney affords him ten. Cullen asks Psalms for his crew's help. Cullen's plans are delayed when he finds Naomi has taken the baby and left for Fort Smith. He meets her to escort her the rest of the way. Hatch tells Cullen that The Swede went to Utah with Brigham Young. Naomi tells Cullen that she will not return to Cheyenne nor to him, if he remains a killer. He vows to return for them one day. Back in Cheyenne, Campbell visits Sydney in jail and appoints him as the new marshal and other inmates as his "deputies". They arrest most of Psalms' crew, whose bond Durant hasn't paid, as well as Durant himself for Heckard's murder. Mickey is also sought for Jessup's murder, but Ruth hides him in the church. Eva, after listening to Charlotte's expression of thanks, manages to get her a job in the dining room at Maggie Palmer's hotel. The Swede is asked by Young who he really is. After lying at first, The Swede is given another chance at the truth. He admits to being Thor Gundersen, and says God sent him to take the Dutsons' lives and become bishop. Young believes him. In Cheyenne, Cullen interrupts Campbell's dinner with Louise to ask him to release Psalms and his crew. Campbell refuses until the town's lawlessness is curbed. Cullen warns him that he asked as a gentleman, then retrieves his gun from his tent.
39	9	"Two Trains"	Marvin V. Rush	Bruce Marshall Romans	September 27, 2014	409	2.30
Cullen's attempt to have Sydney release the freedmen fails, resulting in a jail-break plot with Delaney and Mickey. Campbell says the prisoners should be taken by train to the jurisdictions where their crimes were committed, and Durant will be sent to Omaha to face a judge. Mickey manages to get himself arrested and lies to Sydney, saying the plan will occur as the men are being loaded onto the train. Instead, Cullen later unhooks the railcar with the prisoners, as they use a key he gave Mickey to escape their shackles. Meanwhile, Delaney arrives from the other end on a train with a Gatling gun and rifles for the prisoners. After a shootout, Sidney escapes. In Cheyenne, Campbell and Louise's relationship deepens, and they have sex.
40	10	"Return to Hell"	Billy Gierhart	Jami O'Brien	October 4, 2014	410	2.26
Cullen returns to Cheyenne with Durant, Mickey, and the freedmen. The workers take refuge in the church, while Durant and Cullen make compromises with Campbell about the railroad construction and upholding the law. Sydney blocks the door to the church and sets fire to it, as Ruth watches in horror. Most of the men are able to escape, except those shot at by Sydney. Eva finds the man who raped her among those injured, and she smothers him to death while Louise watches from a distance. Louise later mentions this to Eva but promises to keep it secret, as the man also once raped her. Ruth cannot find Ezra, and Mickey mentions the hiding place under the floorboards of the church. There, Cullen and Ruth find Ezra dead. Cullen forces Campbell, at gunpoint, to allow justice be served on Sydney, even if he has fled. In Utah, Brigham Young and The Swede discuss the Central Pacific Railroad's progress with Collis Huntington (Tim Guinee), although The Swede oversteps his bounds and Young corrects him. Huntington shows interest in The Swede, nevertheless. Back in Cheyenne, Louise tells Campbell she is writing an article about his administration, which he might not like. After burying Ezra, Ruth tells Cullen that her wish is for Sydney to be returned to Hell and for his suffering to be "deep and eternal". Sydney returns to challenge Cullen to a duel – though Cullen says he's done with killing and will arrest him. He says Cullen will have to take his guns from him. As they approach each other, Ruth gets another man's gun and shoots Sydney twice.
41	11	"Bleeding Kansas"	Seith Mann	Michael C. Martin & Jimmy Mero	November 8, 2014	411	1.89
Cullen enlists Durant and Eva's help to save Sydney's life, whatever the cost, in order to keep Ruth from being hanged for his death. Ruth, while being kept at Louise's newspaper office, reflects on her upbringing with Reverend Cole (Tom Noonan), who abandoned his roles as both father and preacher. Despite all efforts to save Sydney, he dies. Campbell, still trying to get Cullen to be a lawman, forces him to arrest Ruth, who shows no remorse. Meanwhile, Mickey's Irish cousin, Johnny Shea (Andrew Howard), arrives to be the new saloon proprietor and Mickey's protector.
42	12	"Thirteen Steps"	Roxann Dawson	Tom Brady	November 15, 2014	412	1.74
The casino is converted into a courtroom, where Ruth pleads guilty to mortally shooting Sidney. Despite a written statement from Cullen stating she protected an officer of the law, Ruth is sentenced to hang. Cullen begs Campbell to pardon her, as a hanging would serve no purpose. Campbell offers to do so, if Ruth accepts the pardon, which she doesn't. Louise informs Campbell of the article that she is publishing about his kangaroo court. He says Ruth made her decision, but Louise asks if Sidney's appointment as marshal and his burning of the church were also Ruth's decisions. Campbell asks if Ruth should be made a saint; Louise is still deciding on a devil. Cullen's attempts to change Ruth's mind prove futile. Ruth professes to love Cullen but said she remained quiet when he returned with his new family. She tells him to always choose family and to go to them. The gallows get constructed in the town square, and Ruth is hanged. Campbell asks Louise to not print the article, or their relationship will end. She chooses the former. The steam shovel gets tested and works. Durant tells Cullen to wire General Grant that the summit will be reached by month's end. Cullen replies, "I quit."
43	13	"Further West"	Adam Davidson	John Wirth & John Romano	November 22, 2014	413	2.17
Cullen leaves the Union Pacific and rides to Fort Smith to be with his family. However, upon arrival, he finds some of the fort's residents are missing, including Naomi and baby William, and the rest are dead. He buries the dead and proceeds to Salt Lake City for answers. There, he learns that Fort Smith had an outbreak of smallpox. He finds someone with the Hatch name at a makeshift clinic, but it is Naomi's mother, who tells Cullen that Naomi was sent somewhere west, where he will never find her. Collis Huntington sees Cullen and offers him principal interest in the Central Pacific, which, with its expansion, may possibly be the only way Cullen will find his family. Back in Cheyenne, Campbell has had the provisional part removed from his governorship and begins to obtain most of the businesses there, except for the newspaper, which is owned by the railroad, and he fails to convince its editor, Louise Ellison, to partner with him. Durant and his crew reach the summit, and Durant telegraphs Huntington in California, to gloat. Cullen arrives at Huntington's version of Hell on Wheels and accepts Huntington's offer, at least until Cullen's family is found
