= Big Bad Wolf (Hell on Wheels) =

- Hell on Wheels episode
- Episode no.: Season 3 Episode 1
- Directed by: David Von Ancken
- Written by: Mark Richard
- Production code: 301
- Original air date: August 10, 2013

Episode chronology
| ← Previous "Blood Moon Rising" | Next → "Eminent Domain" |
- Hell on Wheels (season 3)

"Big Bad Wolf" is the first episode of the third season of the American television drama series Hell on Wheels, which aired on August 10, 2013, on AMC. The twenty-first episode of the series is written by Mark Richard and directed by David Von Ancken. In the episode, Cullen Bohannon attempts to obtain engineer control of the Union Pacific Railroad, while an imprisoned Thomas C. Durant (Colm Meaney) wishes to prevent that. Elam (Common) and Eva (Robin McLeavy) welcome their new baby.

== Plot ==
Alone in his snow-covered burned-out caboose, Cullen hallucinates seeing Doc Whitehead (Grainger Hines), who tells him that his candle will soon go out. Cullen runs outside to a riverbank, splashes water on his face, and hears a wolf howl. Cullen fends off its attack and scares it off. Cullen finds the train engineer frozen to death and takes his tobacco pipe. He then walks to the train engine, breaks ice away, and starts a fire in its firebox. With the engine cranked up, he drives it away from the destroyed town.

He arrives in Omaha, Nebraska and describes Elam and Eva to ask their location. He finds a shotgun in his face when he knocks on Elam's door. A very-pregnant Eva lies on a bed behind Elam. Cullen orders him to accompany him to New York or lose his place on the railroad. Eva insists Elam go as they need the work. In New York City, Clement Beale (Ben Ratner), Secretary of Crédit Mobilier, greets Cullen and Elam with news that the Chief Engineer position has already been filled. Cullen has Clement take him to see Thomas Durant in Hudson Prison, where Cullen asks Durant to vouch for him to Crédit Mobilier. Durant refuses. They won't listen to him and, besides, Cullen is not a Yankee.

Cullen buys new suits for himself and Elam. The Irish shop owner tells Cullen where to find railroad workers. At the Credit Mobilier office, Congressman Ames tells Cullen the job belongs to Senator Metcalf's (Wayne Duvall) son-in-law. A determined Cullen presents the board with detailed plans and designs. He is awarded the job with Union Pacific stock as payment. He and Elam talk with Three Piece Duffy (Scott Michael Campbell) about hiring railroad workers. Cullen refuses Duffy's wanting gold upfront. A gang circles and Elam reaches for Cullen's gun. Cullen must get the two out of the situation.

In their hotel room, Cullen reprimands Elam for grabbing his gun and mocks Elam for thinking he's truly free. They fight but are interrupted by a telegram about Eva having the baby. Cullen later enters a church. Alone, he repents for the things he's done and those he's left undone. In his cell, Durant criticizes Senator Metcalf for failure to oust Bohannon. He warns the senator that his fall will be greater if Durant is not returned to the railroad.

Beale shows Cullen to Durant's former railroad car. Collis Huntington (Tim Guinee), head of Central Pacific Railroad, awaits Cullen and tells him the Union Pacific is broke. He offers Cullen an opportunity to cross the California border, promising gold as payment, but Cullen declines. At home, Elam greets his newborn daughter. At the Omaha train station, Sean McGinnes (Ben Esler) tells Cullen that the many workers arrived after hearing Cullen was back. Ruth Cole (Kasha Kropinski) prays in front of the train as Elam and Eva pack their belongings. Mickey McGinnes (Phil Burke) talks to a group of prostitutes. Durant leaves the prison in a carriage with Metcalf. Cullen tosses his hat in the air as the train takes off.

== Reception ==
=== Ratings ===
"Big Bad Wolf" was watched by 2.49 million viewers and received a 0.5 rating among viewers aged 18–49, an increase from the second season's premiere and double the network's Saturday prime time average.

=== Critical reception ===
The A.V. Club's Alasdair Wilkins gave the episode a 'B−' grade, stating "There's certainly some promise in this apparent new direction; if nothing else, the show seems to be more directly about railroads than it ever was in the first two seasons."
