= Eminent Domain =

Eminent Domain may refer to:

- Eminent domain, the power of a state to take private property for public use
  - Eminent domain in the United States
- Eminent Domain (film), 1990
- "Eminent Domain" (Hell on Wheels), a 2013 episode of the TV drama
- "Eminent Domain" (The Killing), a 2013 episode of the TV drama
- Pax Imperia: Eminent Domain, a video game
