= Curtin (film) =

- DVD cover
- Written by: Alison Nisselle
- Directed by: Jessica Hobbs
- Starring: William McInnes; Noni Hazlehurst; Asher Keddie; Ben Esler; Geoff Morrell; Bille Brown
- Country of origin: Australia
- Original language: English

Production
- Producers: Andrew Wiseman; Richard Keddie
- Running time: 93 minutes

Original release
- Release: 22 April 2007 (Australia)

Curtin is a 2007 television film about John Curtin, the Prime Minister of Australia during the Second World War. The film won Most Outstanding Drama Series, Miniseries, or Telemovie at the 2008 Logie Awards and the Australian Screen Sound Guild Award in 2007 for its sound team.

== Plot ==
The film covers the period from just before Curtin becoming prime minister in October 1941 until the return of the 6th and 7th Divisions to Australia (Operation Stepsister) at the start of the Pacific war in March 1942. The film concludes with a montage of footage of Curtin's funeral in 1945.

== Cast ==
- William McInnes as John Curtin
- Noni Hazlehurst as Elsie Curtin
- Asher Keddie as Elsie Jnr
- Ben Esler as John Jnr
- Geoff Morrell as Ben Chifley
- Bille Brown as Robert Menzies
- Paul English as H. V. Evatt
- Frank Gallacher as Jack Beasley
- William Zappa as General Vernon Sturdee
- Shingo Usami as Tatsuo Kawai
- Robert Grubb as Percy Spender
- Tony Rickards as Eddie Ward
- Drew Lindo as Arthur Fadden
- Alethea McGrath as Mrs. Needham
- Dan Wyllie as Don Rodgers
- Brian Meegan as Frederick Shedden
- Roz Hammond as Gladys Joyce
- Nicholas Opolski as Fred McLaughlin
- Hunter Perske as Don Whitington

== Production ==
Much of the film was made in Victoria, with the exception of scenes filmed at Old Parliament House, Canberra.
