= John Allen Campbell =

Union Army General and governor of Wyoming (1835–1880)

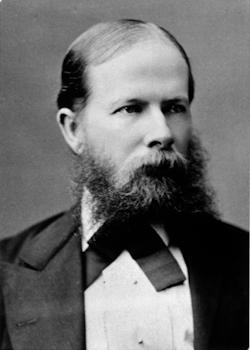

1st Governor of the Wyoming Territory
- In office April 7, 1869 – February 10, 1875
- Appointed by: Ulysses S. Grant
- Preceded by: Office established
- Succeeded by: John Milton Thayer

1st Third Assistant Secretary of State
- In office February 24, 1875 – November 30, 1877
- President: Ulysses S. Grant; Rutherford B. Hayes
- Preceded by: Office established
- Succeeded by: Charles Payson

Personal details
- Born: October 8, 1835 Salem, Ohio, U.S.
- Died: July 14, 1880 (aged 44) Washington, D.C., U.S.
- Resting place: Arlington National Cemetery
- Party: Republican
- Spouse: Isabella Wunderly

Military service
- Allegiance: United States
- Branch/service: United States Army
- Years of service: 1861-1869
- Rank: Lieutenant colonel Brevet brigadier general
- Battles/wars: American Civil War

John Allen Campbell (October 8, 1835 – July 14, 1880) was a politician and officer in the United States Army, as well as the first Governor of the Wyoming Territory.

== Biography ==
Campbell was born in Salem, Ohio, and attended public school in Ohio. As a young man, he was an attendee of the 1850 Ohio Women's Rights Convention. In 1861, he joined the Union Army in the Civil War, during which time he served as a publicity writer and later as adjutant general on Major General John M. Schofield's staff. He advanced from lieutenant to lieutenant colonel. On February 24, 1866, President Andrew Johnson nominated Campbell for appointment to the grade of brevet brigadier general of volunteers, to rank from March 13, 1865, and the United States Senate confirmed the appointment on April 10, 1866.

John Campbell married Isabella Wunderly, daughter of Benjamin Wunderly and Rachel Knettle Wunderly, on February 1, 1872. Campbell died 8 years later. Isabella never remarried and died on September 23, 1923, in Washington, D.C. Both John and Isabella are buried at the Arlington National Cemetery, Washington, D.C.

== Career ==
Campbell continued to serve under Major General Schofield during the Reconstruction Period, and in Virginia Campbell helped set up senatorial and representative districts. President Ulysses S. Grant appointed him Governor of Wyoming Territory in 1869 and again in 1873. While Governor, Campbell approved the first law in United States history explicitly granting women the right to vote. The law was approved on December 10, 1869. This day was later commemorated as Wyoming Day.

In 1875, Campbell served as Third Assistant Secretary of State under Secretary of State Hamilton Fish. Campbell was a member of the Republican Party.

Campbell was appointed American Consul at Basel, Switzerland, on December 3, 1877, and resigned on February 4, 1880.

== Death and legacy ==
Campbell died on July 14, 1880, and is interred at Arlington National Cemetery in Arlington, Virginia. Campbell County, Wyoming, was named either for him or for Robert Campbell, an early trapper, who was a fur trader associated with William Henry Ashley.

== In popular culture ==
- Campbell is portrayed by Ed Prentiss in the Lawman episode "The Truce" (1960), starring John Russell. In the story line, a wanted outlaw, O.C. Coulsen (played by Robert McQueeney) turns himself in to Marshal Dan Troop in hopes that Governor Campbell will grant Coulsen clemency, because Coulsen had saved the governor's life during the American Civil War. Meanwhile, a sheriff in pursuit seeks credit for Coulsen's arrest. The governor informs Coulsen that he must first undergo arrest and trial before there can be any consideration of a pardon.
- Campbell is portrayed by Jake Weber as the provisional governor of Wyoming and overseer of the Union Pacific Railroad in Hell on Wheels' fourth and fifth seasons.

== See also ==
- List of American Civil War brevet generals (Union)
- Women's suffrage in Wyoming

Government offices
Preceded by New Office	Third Assistant Secretary of State; February 24, 1875 – November 30, 1877	Succeeded by Charles Payson
