= Angela Zhou =

New Zealand actress

- Born: Guangdong, China
- Education: Duke University
- Occupation(s): Actress, Writer
- Years active: 2014—
- Television: Hell on Wheels; Death and Other Details

Angela Zhou is a Chinese-born actress and writer from New Zealand.

== Early life ==
Zhou was born in Guangdong province and speaks Mandarin and Cantonese. She grew up in New Zealand after her family moved there when she was four years old. Her involvement in youth theatre included performing at the Globe Theatre in London with the Young Shakespeare Company in a production of As You Like It. In 2010, Zhou was awarded a Robertson Scholarship, which allowed her to study film at Duke University, graduating in 2014.

== Career ==
Zhou appeared in series five of the AMC series Hell on Wheels, as well as Freeform's Stitchers. She played Grace Parker and her alter ego Pestilence in The CW's Supergirl. She also appeared in CBS rebooted series MacGyver, and NCIS: Los Angeles. She appeared in the Emerald Fennell film Promising Young Woman in 2020.

She had a main role in the 2024 Hulu murder mystery series Death and Other Details. She was also part of the writers room on the series after impressing show creators Mike Weiss and Heidi Cole McAdam with her script Empress, about China’s first and only female emperor, Wu Zetian, which was submitted for in the Nicholl Fellowships in Screenwriting.

== Filmography ==
Year	Title	Role	Notes
2014	The Jeff Show	Sue	
2015	Hell on Wheels	Fong/Mei	Season 5
2016-2017	Stitchers	Coco Soo	
2018	Supergirl	Dr Grace Parker/Pestilence	
2020	Promising Young Woman	Todd	
2020	MacGyver	Jennifer	
2021	NCIS: Los Angeles	Lauren	
2024	Death and Other Details	Teddy	Also writer
2025	Doctor Odyssey	Cynthia	1 episode
