= Hell on Wheels (TV series) =

American Western television series

- Genre: Western
- Created by: Joe Gayton; Tony Gayton
- Showrunners: Joe Gayton; Tony Gayton; John Wirth
- Starring: Anson Mount; Colm Meaney; Common; Dominique McElligott; Tom Noonan; Eddie Spears; Ben Esler; Phil Burke; Christopher Heyerdahl; Robin McLeavy; Kasha Kropinski; Dohn Norwood; Jennifer Ferrin; MacKenzie Porter; Jake Weber; Tim Guinee; Byron Mann; Reg Rogers; Angela Zhou; Chelah Horsdal
- Theme music composer: Gustavo Santaolalla
- Composer: Kevin Kiner
- Country of origin: United States
- Original language: English
- No. of seasons: 5
- No. of episodes: 57 (list of episodes)

Production
- Executive producers: Jeremy Gold; Joe Gayton; Tony Gayton; David Von Ancken; John Wirth; Michael Rosenberg; Paul Kurta; Chad Oakes; Michael Frislev
- Producers: Peter Chomsky; Thomas Brady; Anson Mount
- Production locations: Calgary, Alberta, Canada
- Cinematography: Elliot Davis (pilot); Marvin V. Rush; Thomas Burstyn
- Running time: 40–50 minutes
- Production companies: Entertainment One Television; Nomadic Pictures; (Gayton)^{2}; Endemol USA; Wirthwhile TV; AMC Studios

Original release
- Network: AMC
- Release: November 6, 2011 – July 23, 2016

Hell on Wheels is an American Western television series about the construction of the first transcontinental railroad across the United States, which broadcast in the United States and Canada on the cable channel AMC, from November 6, 2011 to July 23, 2016. The series, which features Anson Mount, Colm Meaney, Common, and Dominique McElligott, chronicles the Union Pacific Railroad and its laborers, mercenaries, prostitutes, surveyors, and others who lived, worked, and died in the mobile encampment, called "Hell on Wheels", that followed the railhead west across the Great Plains.

In particular, the story focuses on Cullen Bohannon (Mount), a former Confederate soldier who initially joins the railroad to track down Union soldiers who murdered his wife and young son during the American Civil War. In the process he becomes a foreman and eventually chief engineer on the railroad. The first season is set in 1865, shortly after the assassination of Abraham Lincoln, with the fifth and final season set in 1869.

The series was created and produced by Joe and Tony Gayton, and developed by Endemol USA, under the stewardship of senior vice-president of scripted programming Jeremy Gold, and it is produced by Entertainment One and Nomadic Pictures. In 2012, AMC announced creators Joe and Tony Gayton were no longer involved in the day-to-day production of the series. On December 12, 2012, AMC announced that writer John Wirth would take over as showrunner for the third season.

== Cast and characters ==
=== Main cast ===
- Anson Mount as Cullen Bohannon, a former Confederate cavalry Colonel who is determined to avenge the murders of his wife, Mary, and his son. Bohannon later leaves revenge in the past and becomes a "railroad man", acting as the foreman for the Transcontinental Railroad.
- Colm Meaney as Thomas "Doc" Durant, a businessman and investor in the First Transcontinental Railroad, who will stop at nothing to make his fortune.
- Common as Elam Ferguson, a recently freed black slave who is trying to find his place in the world. He works as security and general assistant to Bohannon. (season 1–4)
- Dominique McElligott as Lily Bell, a recent widow who attempts to establish a position for herself with the railroad. Her husband was a surveyor for the Transcontinental Railroad. (seasons 1–2)
- Tom Noonan as Reverend Nathaniel Cole, a minister who formerly participated in Bleeding Kansas prior to the Civil War; he is sick of the slaughter and wants to help the whites and Indians avoid another war. (seasons 1–2; guest season 4)
- Eddie Spears as Joseph Black Moon, a Cheyenne Christian convert who must choose between the new world and the traditions of his ancestors. (seasons 1–2)
- Ben Esler as Seán McGinnes, an ambitious young Irishman looking to make his fortune in the West. (seasons 1–3)
- Phil Burke as Michael "Mickey" McGinnes, Sean's older brother, who has travelled with him to America seeking glory.
- Christopher Heyerdahl as Thor Gundersen, Durant's ruthless head of security. He is also known as "The Swede" even though he is Norwegian (Norway was in a personal union with Sweden at the time of the show's setting). (seasons 2–5; recurring season 1)
- Robin McLeavy as Eva Toole, a woman with a prominent chin-tattoo given to her while in the captivity of Indians. She initially supports herself by working in the Hell on Wheels brothel while supporting those in need. (seasons 2–5; recurring season 1)
- Kasha Kropinski as Ruth Cole, Reverend Cole's estranged daughter and the heir to his church. (seasons 3–4; recurring season 2; guest season 1)
- Dohn Norwood as Psalms Jackson, a former slave and criminal whose prison sentence has been purchased by the railroad. (seasons 3–5; recurring seasons 1–2)
- Jennifer Ferrin as Louise Ellison, a smart, witty and flirtatious journalist hired by the New York Tribune to cover the "story of the century". (seasons 3–5)
- MacKenzie Porter as Naomi Hatch, Aaron Hatch's daughter and Cullen's second wife. (seasons 4–5)
  - Siobhan Williams portrayed Naomi in a guest role in the third season.
- Jake Weber as John Allen Campbell, the first governor of the territory of Wyoming who attempts to establish order in Cheyenne. (season 4; recurring season 5)
- Tim Guinee as Collis Huntington, an investor in the Central Pacific Railroad. (season 5; recurring seasons 3–4)
- Reg Rogers as James Strobridge, the superintendent for the Central Pacific Railroad. (season 5)
- Byron Mann as Chang, the main supplier for the Chinese workers who also runs the opium dens and brothels. (season 5)
- Angela Zhou as Mei/ Fong, a Chinese railroad worker for the Central Pacific Railroad with a secret to hide. (season 5)
- Chelah Horsdal as Maggie Palmer, a prominent businesswoman in Cheyenne and an investor in the Union Pacific Railroad. (season 5; recurring seasons 3–4)

==== Cast table ====
= Main cast (credited)
= Recurring cast (3+)
= Guest cast (1-2)

Actor	Character	Seasons					
Actor	Character	1	2	3	4	5	
Actor	Character	1	2	3	4	Part 1	Part 2
Anson Mount	Cullen Bohannon	Main	Main	Main	Main	Main	Main
Colm Meaney	Thomas C. Durant	Main	Main	Main	Main	Main	Main
Common	Elam Ferguson	Main	Main	Main	Main		
Dominique McElligott	Lily Bell	Main	Main				
Tom Noonan	Reverend Nathaniel	Main	Main		Guest		
Eddie Spears	Joseph Black Moon	Main	Main				
Ben Esler	Seán McGinnes	Main	Main	Main			
Phil Burke	Mickey McGinnes	Main	Main	Main	Main	Main	Main
Christopher Heyerdahl	Thor Gundersen "The Swede"	Recurring	Main (Note: Heyerdahl only appears in one episode of the second part of season five, although credited as a main cast member.)	Main	Main	Main	Main
Robin McLeavy	Eva Toole (née Oates)	Recurring	Main	Main	Main	Main	Main
Kasha Kropinski	Ruth Cole	Guest	Recurring	Main (Note: In season four, Ruth Cole is also portrayed by guest actress Malia Ashley Kerr in a flashback scene.)	Main		
Dohn Norwood	Psalms Jackson	Recurring	Recurring	Main	Main	Main	Main
Jennifer Ferrin	Louise Ellison			Main	Main	Main	Main
Siobhan Williams	Naomi Hatch			Guest			
MacKenzie Porter	Naomi Hatch				Main	Main	Main
Jake Weber	John Campbell				Main		Recurring
Tim Guinee	Collis Huntington			Guest	Guest	Main	Main
Byron Mann	Chang					Main	Main
Reg Rogers	James Strobridge					Main	Main
Angela Zhou	Mei / Fong					Main	Main
Chelah Horsdal	Maggie Palmer			Recurring	Recurring	Main	Main

=== Recurring cast ===
- April Telek as Nell, the madam of the Hell on Wheels brothel. (seasons 1–2)
- Duncan Ollerenshaw as Gregory Toole, an Irish laborer on the railroad; antagonist to Elam. (seasons 1–2)
- Chris Ippolito as a young engineer. (seasons 1–2)
- Ian Tracey as Bolan. (season 1)
- James D. Hopkin as Senator Jordan Crane, both ally and antagonist to Durant. (season 1)
- Diego Diablo Del Mar as Dix, a member of Thor Gundersen's security force. (season 1)
- Wes Studi as Chief Many Horses, Joseph's father. (season 1)
- Gerald Auger as Pawnee Killer, Chief Many Horses' son and Joseph's brother. (season 1)
- James Dugan as Carl the Bartender. (seasons 1–2)
- Grainger Hines as Doc Whitehead, a southerner and father figure to Cullen, who knew him before the war. (seasons 2–3)
- Virginia Madsen as Mrs. Hannah Durant, Thomas' headstrong wife. (season 2)
- James Shanklin as Aaron Hatch, Mormon, father to Naomi and father-in-law to Cullen Bohannon. (seasons 3–5)
- Kevin Davey as Paddy Quinn, a Union Pacific Railroad walking boss from Ireland. (seasons 3–5)
- Haysam Kadri as Dutch Dufray, a worker on the Union Pacific Railroad. (seasons 3–5)
- Leon Ingulsrud as Major Augustus Bendix. (seasons 3–5)
- Tayden Marks as Ezra Dutson, a young Mormon boy who is traveling across the prairie with his parents. (seasons 3–4)
- Serge Houde as Congressman Oakes Ames. (season 3)
- Damian O'Hare as Declan Toole, Gregory's brother. (season 3)
- David Wilson Barnes as Martin Delaney, chief engineer. (seasons 4–5)
- Gregg Henry as Brigham Young, leader of the Mormons and President of the Church of Jesus Christ of Latter-day Saints. (seasons 4–5)
- Andrew Howard as Dandy Johnny Shea, Mickey's cousin. (seasons 4–5)
- Kevin Blatch as Judge Webber. (seasons 4–5)
- Jonathan Scarfe as Sydney Snow, former Confederate soldier. (season 4)
- Christian Sloan as Parker (season 4)
- Billy Wickman as Heckard, a member of John Campbell's entourage. (season 4)
- Peter Benson as Marshal Jessup. (season 4)
- Gia Crovatin as Mrs. Delaney. (season 4)
- Amber Chardae Robinson as Mary Fields, stagecoach driver. (season 5)
- Josh Caras as Phineas Young, Brigham's son. (season 5)
- Tzi Ma as Tao, head of the Chinese crew for the Central Pacific Railroad and Fong/Mei's father. (season 5)

==== Cast table ====
= Recurring cast (3+)
= Guest cast (1-2)

Actor	Character	Seasons					
Actor	Character	1	2	3	4	5	
Actor	Character	1	2	3	4	Part 1	Part 2
April Telek	Nell	Recurring	Recurring				
Duncan Ollerenshaw	Gregory Toole	Recurring	Recurring				
Chris Ippolito	Young Engineer	Recurring	Recurring				
Ian Tracey	Bolan	Recurring					
James D. Hopkin	Senator Jordan Crane	Recurring					
Diego Diablo Del Mar	Dix	Recurring					
Wes Studi	Chief Many Horses	Recurring					
Gerald Auger	Pawnee Killer	Recurring					
James Dugan	Carl the Bartender	Guest	Recurring				
Grainger Hines	Doc Whitehead		Recurring	Guest			
Virginia Madsen	Mrs. Hannah Durant		Recurring				
James Shanklin	Aaron Hatch			Recurring	Recurring	Guest	Guest
Kevin Davey	Paddy Quinn			Recurring	Recurring	Guest	Guest
Haysam Kadri	Dutch Dufray			Recurring	Recurring	Guest	Guest
Leon Ingulsrud	Major Augustus Bendix			Recurring	Recurring		Recurring
Tayden Marks	Ezra Dutson			Recurring	Recurring		
Serge Houde	Congressman Oakes Ames			Recurring			
Damian O'Hare	Declan Toole			Recurring			
David Wilson Barnes	Martin Delaney				Recurring	Recurring	Recurring
Gregg Henry	Brigham Young				Recurring	Guest	Guest
Andrew Howard	Dandy Johnny Shea				Recurring	Guest	Guest
Kevin Blatch	Judge Webber				Recurring		Guest
Jonathan Scarfe	Sydney Snow				Recurring		
Billy Wickman	Heckard				Recurring		
Peter Benson	Marshal Jessup				Recurring		
Gia Crovatin	Mrs. Delaney				Recurring		
Amber Chardae Robinson	Mary Fields					Recurring	Guest
Josh Caras	Phineas Young					Recurring	
Tzi Ma	Tao					Recurring	

=== Notable guest cast ===
- Ted Levine as Daniel Johnson, Cullen's predecessor as foreman of the Union Pacific Railroad. (Season 1)
- Robert Moloney as Robert Bell, Lily's husband. (Season 1)
- Kassia Warshawski as Mary Bohannon, Cullen's deceased wife. (Season 1)
- Ryan Robbins as Hawkins, leader of a gang of ex-Confederate train robbers. (Season 2)
- Victor Slezak as Ulysses S. Grant. (Seasons 3–5)

== Series overview ==
=== Season One (2011–12) ===
In 1865, former Confederate soldier Cullen Bohannon (Anson Mount) journeys to the Union Pacific Railroad's westward construction of the First Transcontinental Railroad, seeking both work and vengeance on the Union soldiers who killed his wife and son. Cullen gets hired by the railroad and supervises an all-black "cut crew", including Elam (Common), whose job is to prepare the terrain for track laying. Through conversation with the railroad foreman, Daniel Johnson (Ted Levine), Cullen learns more about his wife's death, but tragedy strikes before Johnson reveals her killer's name. Thomas "Doc" Durant (Colm Meaney) begins his "mad, noble quest" to expand his Union Pacific westward, in order to complete the transcontinental railroad. Lily Bell (Dominique McElligott) accompanies her ailing husband, Robert (Robert Moloney), as he surveys the landscape for the Union Pacific; when Robert is killed by the Cheyenne natives, Lily must cope with being a widow on foreign soil. Reverend Nathaniel Cole (Tom Noonan) baptizes Joseph Black Moon (Eddie Spears), a Cheyenne, then takes him under his tutelage in the church. Season one ends with Bohannon killing a man he believes was responsible for the rape and murder of his wife, only to discover that man was not there at the time.

=== Season Two (2012) ===
Bohannon tries to find himself again while continuing to drive the westward expansion of the Union Pacific Railroad, under Durant's leadership. Bohannon takes up with a gang of train robbers but is turned over to the Union Army and imprisoned. Durant manages to get him pardoned. The railroad construction enters the Sioux territory, where The Swede and a misguided Reverend Cole assist the natives in attacking the railroad. Lily Bell seeks to gain control of the railroad from Durant and mails his accounting ledgers to the government. Army officers arrive to find the town has been attacked by the Sioux.

=== Season Three (2013) ===
Bohannon abandons his quest to avenge his wife and son's deaths, in order to battle Durant for control of the Union Pacific Railroad. Eva gives birth to a baby who was sired during her marriage to Gregory Toole. Elam proposes marriage to her, even though her post-partum depression weighs heavily on her. The Swede takes up with a Mormon family on their way to the fictional Fort Smith and later reveals his true nature.

=== Season Four (2014) ===
Conflict arises among the government and businesses, ranchers, homesteaders, and the railroad as all of those interests compete with one another for control of Cheyenne, Wyoming, the most important railroad hub in 1867. Meanwhile, the Union Pacific Railroad continues its expansion westward, and Bohannon adjusts to being a husband and father again.

=== Season Five (2015–16) ===
In season 5, set in California and Laramie, Wyoming, Bohannon is hired by the Central Pacific Railroad to build the transcontinental railroad eastward over the Sierra Nevada Mountains. He befriends its Chinese workers, including Mei, a woman disguised as a man known as Fong. President Ulysses S. Grant increases the competition between the Central Pacific and Union Pacific Railroad companies. This is further complicated by Thomas Durant's corruption.

== Episodes ==
Season	Episodes		Originally released	
Season	Episodes		First released	Last released
1	10		November 6, 2011	January 15, 2012
2	10		August 12, 2012	October 7, 2012
3	10		August 10, 2013	October 5, 2013
4	13		August 2, 2014	November 22, 2014
5	14	7	July 18, 2015	August 29, 2015
5	14	7	June 11, 2016	July 23, 2016

== Production ==
=== Development history ===
Hell on Wheels was created by Joe and Tony Gayton in late 2008, and Endemol USA's scripted television division, headed by senior vice president of original programming Jeremy Gold, came on board to develop the series for AMC. On May 18, 2010, AMC placed a pilot order for Hell on Wheels with Endemol USA. Joe and Tony Gayton wrote the pilot, David Von Ancken was attached to the project as director, and Jeremy Gold, Joe Gayton, and Tony Gayton served as executive producers. On July 6, 2010, Endemol USA announced that they had entered into a partnership with Entertainment One, which would serve as the production studio on the project.

Part of the deal between the two companies included provisions of international distribution, with Endemol retaining rights to the series across Europe, while Entertainment One acquired rights to Hell on Wheels in all remaining territories. As a result of the deal, Entertainment One also holds global rights for DVD and Blu-ray sales, as well as video-on-demand and other digital distribution services. The Canadian production company Nomadic Pictures was brought onto the project to serve as co-producers alongside Entertainment One. The pilot was delivered to AMC executives in November 2010.

On November 12, 2010, it was reported by Deadline that the executives at AMC were impressed with the pilot, and, coupled with the fact that the network had just cancelled their drama series, Rubicon, were likely to order Hell on Wheels to series.

On December 15, 2010, AMC green-lighted the series with an order of 10 episodes. Along with the series pickup, AMC announced that Nomadic Pictures would again co-produce the series, as they had done for the pilot, with Mike Frislev and Chad Oakes joining the series as producers, while John Shiban and David Von Ancken joined the series as executive producers; Von Ancken had previously served as director on the pilot. The network also announced that John Morayniss and Michael Rosenberg would oversee production for Entertainment One, while Joel Stillerman and Susie Fitzgerald would oversee production for AMC.

On July 28, 2011, AMC announced that Hell on Wheels would premiere on November 6, 2011. The series is produced by Entertainment One and Nomadic Pictures.

On November 8, 2011, co-creator Joe Gayton spoke of the series' origins: "We [Tony and I] started talking and remembered this story, American Experience, which was this really great documentary, and I thought, 'God, that's great. I just learned a bunch of stuff I had never learned before.' You just have this cursory information that the Chinese and the Irish built the railroad, but it got in underneath all the dirt and stuff that went on, with the financing of it, and the greed and corruption. And then, I heard about this Hell on Wheels place and I went, 'What a great setting for a western.' So, we pitched that to Jeremy Gold [at Endemol] and ended up taking it to AMC, and they loved it," he said.

On October 29, 2012, AMC renewed Hell on Wheels for a third season, however it was also announced that the series creators and showrunners, Joe and Tony Gayton, "will no longer be involved day-to-day on the show" and series producer/writer/director John Shiban would take over. Following the departure of Shiban, the renewal was put on hold until a replacement could be found. On December 12, 2012, AMC announced that John Wirth, a writer for Terminator: The Sarah Connor Chronicles, would be the new showrunner, starting with the show's third season.

=== Casting ===
Cullen Bohannon (Anson Mount) is the central character of the series.

Casting announcements began in July 2010, with Common first to be cast. Common portrays Elam Ferguson, "an emancipated slave who is working to achieve true freedom in a world entrenched in prejudice". Next to join the series were Anson Mount and Dominique McElligott, with Mount playing Cullen Bohannon, "a former soldier hell bent on avenging his wife's death", and McElligott playing Lily Bell, "a newly widowed woman trying to survive in a man's world". Colm Meaney was next to be cast as Thomas "Doc" Durant, a "greedy entrepreneur taking full advantage of the changing times". Ben Esler, Phil Burke and Eddie Spears were the last actors to be cast, with Esler playing Seán McGinnes and Burke playing Mickey McGinnes, "two young brothers looking to find their fortune in the new West". Spears was cast as Joseph Black Moon, "a Native American man torn between his culture and the changing world around him". It was later announced that Jesse Lipscombe, Gerald Auger, Robert Moloney and Ted Levine had joined the series as recurring guest stars.

Jennifer Ferrin joined the cast as a series regular for season three, playing a New York Sun journalist covering the construction of the railroad. AMC announced that Dohn Norwood (Psalms) became a series regular for season three.

Jake Weber joined the fourth season's cast. He was initially to portray a carpetbagger seeking to profit from the frontier, but his role changed to John Allen Campbell, first governor of Wyoming. MacKenzie Porter has also been cast. She will replace Siobhan Williams in the role of Naomi, Bohannon's Mormon bride.

==== Cast quotes ====
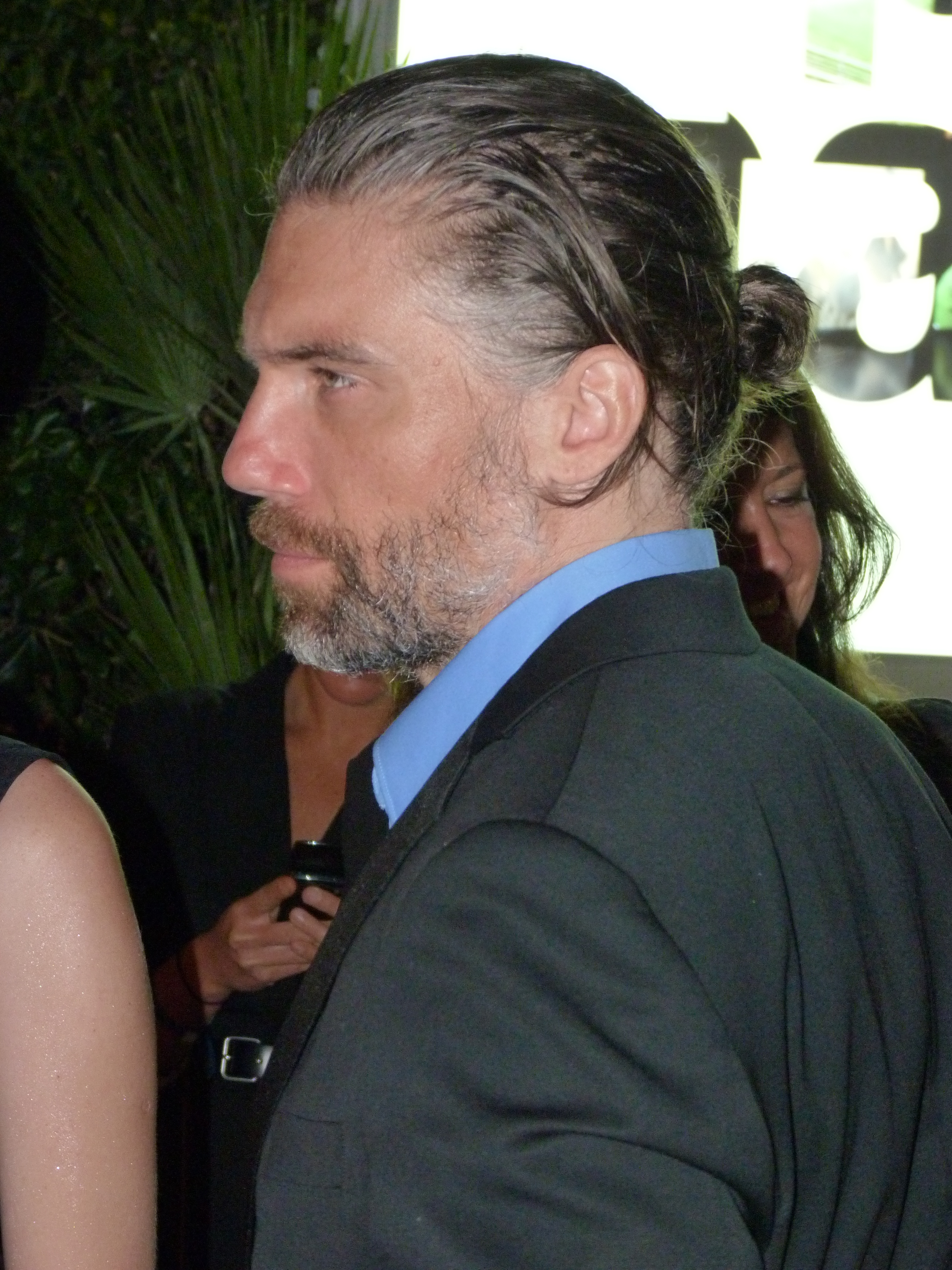
"There's a lot of just being in the right place at the right time, as well as being in the right place and time in my life. I couldn't have played this role 10 years ago—I needed a little bit of life behind me. I'd been wanting to do a western for years but never had the opportunity to do that. So I immediately responded to this project, and I especially responded to the fact that the lead was a southern character who's not stereotyped and not villainized." — Anson Mount

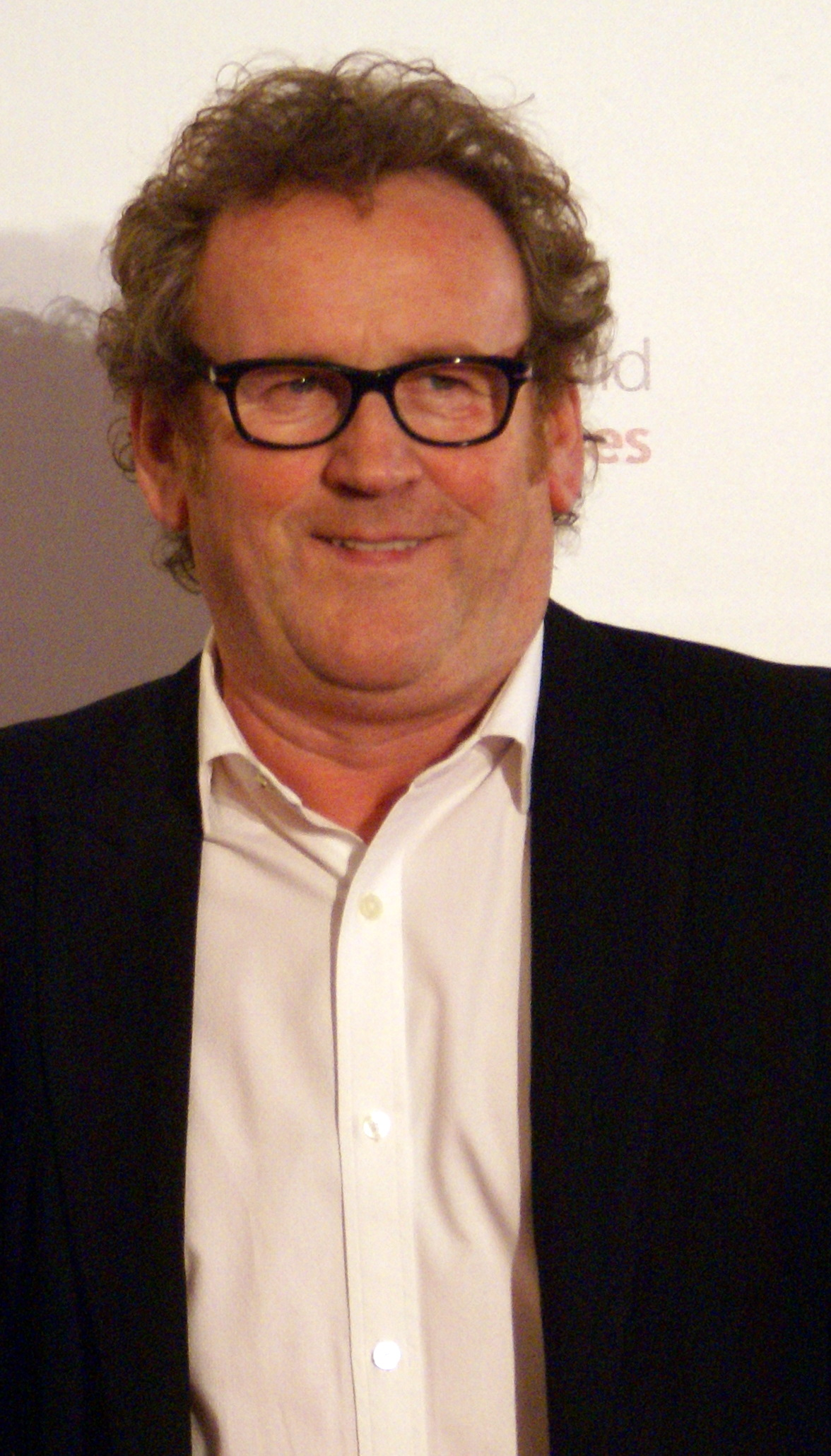
"I usually read a script from an audience perspective first, and then look more closely at the character. With this, it was a complete page-turner. It was fantastically entertaining. And then, specifically looking at the character that they wanted me to play, it really got my juices going. You don't see writing like this, nowadays. The vocabulary he uses is just fantastic. There was no hesitation." — Colm Meaney

Common spoke about the challenges of playing a former slave: "Very challenging. And that's why I took it on. It's a lot of responsibility because what black people went through in slavery, within that system of slavery, was really treacherous. And for me, I felt like I owed it to the people that lived during that time to bring something truthful to the character. And even just revisiting some of the experiences of it, [there] was just a lot of emotion and a lot of pain. At the same time, a lot of strength came from it. What I enjoy most about the character is the fact that he was written so strong, not as just a person that was oppressed and kept his head down."

Canadian actor Christopher Heyerdahl talks about how he got his role and the rarity of a Scandinavian character: "Well, luck and providence, I suppose. They say, 'What's luck? Preparation and opportunity.' So, I guess the opportunity came, in the form of an audition. I put myself on tape, and they responded to it. I went in and did a call-back audition, and they felt that we were on the same track. My idea of who The Swede was, was the same as theirs, and vice versa. This kind of character is very rare, with the fact that it fit so well with my background and my understanding of a Norwegian man. It all just fell into place. I still get a little choked up thinking about how often a character like this comes along. For the viewer, it's quite interesting. It's not a character that we see very often, and certainly not in this form. As an actor, it seemed to be tailor-made for me. It's quite wonderful."

Irish actress Dominique McElligott never expected to be cast in a period American role: "I was hanging out in London, having drinks with friends who are all flight attendants, and they said that they would get me over to America for free, and I could stay and do some meetings and auditions. Hell on Wheels was the first one. I arrived on the 5th of July, and the Hell on Wheels audition was on the 6th or the 7th. It was crazy! They didn't know me, at all. Obviously, I loved the pilot and I loved the character, but I didn't anticipate ever actually getting the chance to do it. When you go up for these brilliant parts, you just figure, 'Okay, well, they're going to pick some American actress, and that will be that.' But, the opportunity was there, and I really enjoyed the audition. It was fun."

=== Exterior filming ===
Filming of the first season took place in Calgary, as well as areas in central and southern Alberta. The T'suu T'ina Native Indian Reservation, an Indian reserve in southern Alberta, was the location for most of the exteriors.

Exterior filming of the second season was near the Bow River in Calgary. Interior filming was in a building near the city's airport. Series producers expected the filming of the season's ten episodes to take about 80 days.

Filming of the third season was suspended part way through the sixth episode when the location was included in the mandatory evacuation area due to the flooding in southern Alberta. Originally, producers had announced a two-day shut down, when the only road to the location was underwater. Later, on June 21, producers announced that the production hiatus, scheduled to begin June 27, would take effect immediately. Anson Mount shared pictures of the nearby river and exterior sets flooding on June 20 and 21.

Filming of the fourth season's 13 episodes took place along the Bow River. Filming occurred from April 24 to September 24, 2014.

The fifth season's production filming occurred on the CL Ranch, west of Calgary, for the Truckee, California, and Laramie, Wyoming, locations. The Kananaskis Country park system, 40 miles west of the ranch, served as the Sierra Nevada mountains the Central Pacific must cross.

== Reception ==
=== Critical response ===
For season one, the review aggregation website Rotten Tomatoes reported a 61% approval rating based on 36 reviews, with an average rating of 7.1/10. The website's critical consensus states, "Its Old West setting and central revenge plot may be overly familiar, but Hell on Wheels holds just enough intrigue to keep things interesting." The first season was given 63% on Metacritic based on 28 reviews, indicating a "generally favorable" impression. The second season was given 60% on Metacritic, indicating "mixed or average" reviews, while Rotten Tomatoes reported a 75% approval rating based on 12 reviews, with an average rating of 7.0/10, and a critical consensus that reads, "While it still feels like it's finding its legs, the second season of Hell on Wheels is more confident than the first and perfectly acceptable for those in need of a Western fix."

The Washington Post's Hank Stuever rated the show highly, commenting, "Hands down, the most intriguing show on the fall slate. Though imbued with epic sweep, Hell on Wheels is a western at heart, even if that heart is cold. Plenty of guns, knives, arrows, scalpings – mixed with the incendiary socio-psychological wounds left in the Civil War's wake."

Robert Lloyd of the Los Angeles Times says the show "...takes its cues more from the movies than from life. Never, in the episodes I watched, did I feel as if I were actually seeing how a railroad got built, and sometimes it took a bit of squinting not to see the characters as actors in a field, reading lines. Still, for all the unlikely things [the creators] make happen in order to get their characters into place, and the dogged refusal of a couple of those characters to become interesting at all, the show gathers steam as it goes on."

The Wall Street Journal's Nancy Dewolf Smith comments: " 'Hell on Wheels' finds enough beauty, danger and emotion to make some part of every episode seem fresh and worth waiting for. Not that new is always a good thing. Despite striking performances even in many of the smaller roles, the actors sometimes are made to symbolize very modern obsessions, e.g. with race and gender. The sight of modern sensibilities lurking behind the curtains can break ye olde spell."

Brian Lowry of Variety writes: "While the diverse mix of characters could work to the program's advantage over the long haul, jumping to and fro among them creates a diluted, herky-jerky ride in the early going."

The Washington Post reported that the series has been criticized for not depicting Chinese immigrants during the transcontinental railroad construction scenes. Creator Joe Gayton said "budget-wise and time-wise ... we could really only concentrate on one side of [the railroad building], and that's probably why we, you know, that's why we chose the [emanating from the East Coast] Union Pacific as opposed to the [emanating from the West Coast] Central Pacific." By the fifth season, the show expanded its focus to include a significant look at the role of Chinese immigrant workers in the growth of the railroad.

=== Ratings ===
The pilot, premiering November 6. 2011, was watched by 4.4 million viewers – AMC's second-highest series premiere in history, following The Walking Dead. Among key demographics, the pilot episode was viewed by 2.4 million viewers in the adults 18–49 category, and 2.3 million viewers in the adults 25–54 demographics, according to Nielsen. The total viewership bested network slot rivals CSI: Miami and Pan Am. The sixth episode was watched by 2.15 million viewers, the lowest viewership of the first season and had a 0.6 rating in the 18–49 age range. The viewership numbers eventually rebounded with the season one finale being watched by 2.84 million viewers, maintaining its steady 0.7 rating in the 18–49 age range. In January 2012, following the season one finale, AMC confirmed Hell on Wheels as the network's second-highest rated original series, behind The Walking Dead, averaging three million viewers per episode.

=== Awards and nominations ===
Year	Award	Category	Recipient	Result	Ref
2012	Emmy Award	Outstanding Original Main Title Theme Music	Gustavo Santaolalla	Nominated	
2012	BET Awards	Best Actor	Common	Nominated	
2012	Directors Guild of Canada Awards	Best Production Design - Television Series	John Blackie	Nominated	
2012	Golden Reel Awards	Best Sound Editing - Short Form Dialogue and ADR in Television	John Kincade, Todd Niesen, Shannon Beament	Nominated	
2013	Saturn Award	Best Supporting Actor on Television	Colm Meaney	Nominated	
2013	BET Awards	Best Actor	Common	Nominated	
2013	Irish Film and Television Awards	Best Actor TV	Colm Meaney	Nominated	
2013	Hollywood Post Alliance Awards	Outstanding Color Grading - Television	Steven Porter	Nominated	
2013	Leo Awards	Best Casting in a Dramatic Series	Jackie Lind	Won	
2013	Leo Awards	Best Guest Performance by a Male in a Dramatic Series	Ryan Robbins	Nominated	
2013	Directors Guild of Canada Awards	Best Production Design - Television Series	John Blackie	Won	
2013	Rosie Awards	Best Dramatic Series	Chad Oakes & Michael Frislev	Won	
2013	Rosie Awards	Best Performance by an Alberta Actor	Duncan Ollerenshaw	Won	
2013	Rosie Awards	Best Performance by an Alberta Actress	Sydney Bell	Nominated	
2013	Rosie Awards	Best Editor (Drama Over 30 Minutes)	Bridget Durnford	Won	
2013	Rosie Awards	Best Overall Sound (Drama Over 30 Minutes)	Frank Laratta	Nominated	
2013	Rosie Awards	Best Production Designer/Art Director	John Blackie & Bill Ives	Won	
2013	Rosie Awards	Best Costume Designer	Carol Case	Won	
2013	Rosie Awards	Best Make-Up Artist	Gail Kennedy	Won	
2013	Visual Effects Society Awards	Outstanding Compositing in a Broadcast Program	Antonio Chang, Jason Fotter, Eric Hayden, Josh Miyaji	Nominated	
2013	Visual Effects Society Awards	Outstanding Supporting Visual Effects in a Broadcast Program	Matt Von Brock, Jason Fotter, Tim Jacobsen, Bill Kent	Nominated	
2013	ACTRA Montreal Awards	Outstanding Male Performance	Christopher Heyerdahl	Won	
2014	Hollywood Makeup Artist and Hair Stylist Guild Awards	Best Period and/or Character Hair Styling - Television and New Media Series	Chris Glimsdale, Penny Thompson	Nominated	
2014	Hollywood Makeup Artist and Hair Stylist Guild Awards	Best Period and/or Character Makeup - Television and New Media Series	Sharon Toohey, Rose Gurevitch	Nominated	
2014	Rosie Awards	Best Dramatic Series	Chad Oakes & Michael Frislev	Won	
2014	Rosie Awards	Best Performance by an Alberta Actor	Kevin Davey	Nominated	
2014	Rosie Awards	Best Editor (Drama Over 30 Minutes)	Bridget Durnford	Won	
2014	Rosie Awards	Best Overall Sound (Drama Over 30 Minutes)	Michael Playfair & Frank Laratta	Won	
2014	Rosie Awards	Best Production Designer/Art Director	John Blackie & Bill Ives	Nominated	
2014	Rosie Awards	Best Costume Designer	Carol Case	Won	
2014	Rosie Awards	Best Make-Up Artist	Sharon Toohey	Won	
2014	Visual Effects Society Awards	Outstanding Created Environment in a Commercial or Broadcast Program	Steve Meyer, Matt Von Brock, Mitch Gates, Antonio Chang	Nominated	
2014	Western Heritage Award	Outstanding Fictional Drama	Episode: "One Less Mule"	Won	
2015	Western Heritage Award	Outstanding Fictional Drama	Episode: "Return to Hell"	Won	
2015	Leo Awards	Best Casting in a Dramatic Series	Jackie Lind	Nominated	
2015	Leo Awards	Best Guest Performance by a Male in a Dramatic Series	Jonathan Scarfe	Won	
2015	Leo Awards	Best Guest Performance by a Female in a Dramatic Series	Sara Canning	Nominated	
2015	Leo Awards	Best Supporting Performance by a Male in a Dramatic Series	Christopher Heyerdahl	Nominated	
2015	Leo Awards	Best Supporting Performance by a Female in a Dramatic Series	Chelah Horsdal	Nominated	
2015	Rosie Awards	Best Dramatic Series	Chad Oakes & Michael Frislev	Won	
2015	Rosie Awards	Best Performance by an Alberta Actor	Jason Cermak	Nominated	
2015	Rosie Awards	Best Editor (Drama Over 30 Minutes)	Bridget Durnford	Won	
2015	Rosie Awards	Best Overall Sound (Drama Over 30 Minutes)	Michael Playfair & Frank Laratta	Nominated	
2015	Rosie Awards	Best Production Designer/Art Director	John Blackie & Bill Ives	Nominated	
2015	Rosie Awards	Best Costume Designer	Carol Case	Nominated	
2015	Rosie Awards	Best Make-Up & Hair Artist(s)	Sharon Toohey & Chris Glimsdale	Won	
2016	Western Heritage Award	Outstanding Fictional Drama	Episode: "Hungry Ghosts"	Won	
2016	Leo Awards	Best Casting in a Dramatic Series	Jackie Lind	Nominated	
2016	Leo Awards	Best Supporting Performance by a Male in a Dramatic Series	Byron Mann	Nominated	
2016	Leo Awards	Best Supporting Performance by a Female in a Dramatic Series	Chelah Horsdal	Nominated	
2016	Golden Maple Awards	Best actor in a TV series broadcast in the U.S.	Christopher Heyerdahl	Nominated	
2016	Golden Maple Awards	Best actor in a TV series broadcast in the U.S.	Byron Mann	Nominated	
2016	Golden Maple Awards	Newcomer of the year in a TV series broadcast in the U.S.	Christopher Heyerdahl	Nominated	
2016	Rosie Awards	Best Dramatic Series	Chad Oakes & Michael Frislev	Won	
2016	Rosie Awards	Best Editor (Drama Over 30 Minutes)	Bridget Durnford	Won	
2016	Rosie Awards	Best Overall Sound (Drama Over 30 Minutes)	Mike Markiw	Nominated	
2016	Rosie Awards	Best Production Designer/Art Director	John Blackie & Bill Ives	Nominated	
2016	Rosie Awards	Best Costume Designer	Carol Case	Won	
2016	Rosie Awards	Best Make-Up & Hair Artist(s)	Sharon Toohey & Laura de Moissac	Nominated	
2017	Rosie Awards	Best Dramatic Series	Chad Oakes & Michael Frislev	Nominated	
2017	Rosie Awards	Best Editor (Drama Over 30 Minutes)	Bridget Durnford	Nominated	
2017	Rosie Awards	Best Overall Sound (Drama Over 30 Minutes)	Frank Laratta & Mike Markiw	Nominated	
2017	Rosie Awards	Best Production Designer/Art Director	John Blackie & Bill Ives	Nominated	
2017	Rosie Awards	Best Costume Designer	Carol Case	Won	
2017	Rosie Awards	Best Make-Up & Hair Artist(s)	Sharon Toohey & Laura de Moissac	Nominated	
2017	Leo Awards	Best Lead Performance by a Male in a Dramatic Series	Christopher Heyerdahl	Nominated	

== International distribution ==
The series is shown in Australia on FX Australia and in Ireland on RTÉ.

== Home media ==
All five seasons of Hell on Wheels have been released in DVD and Blu-ray formats. The complete series was also released in DVD and Blu-ray formats on November 1, 2016, comprising 17 discs. As of June 2019, it is available in the United States on Netflix's online streaming service but is scheduled to be removed at the end of 2020. As of December 2023, It is available in the United States for streaming on Tubi. As of April 2025 it is available for streaming on Paramount Plus.
