= Hell on Wheels =

Collection of gambling houses, dance halls, saloons, and brothels

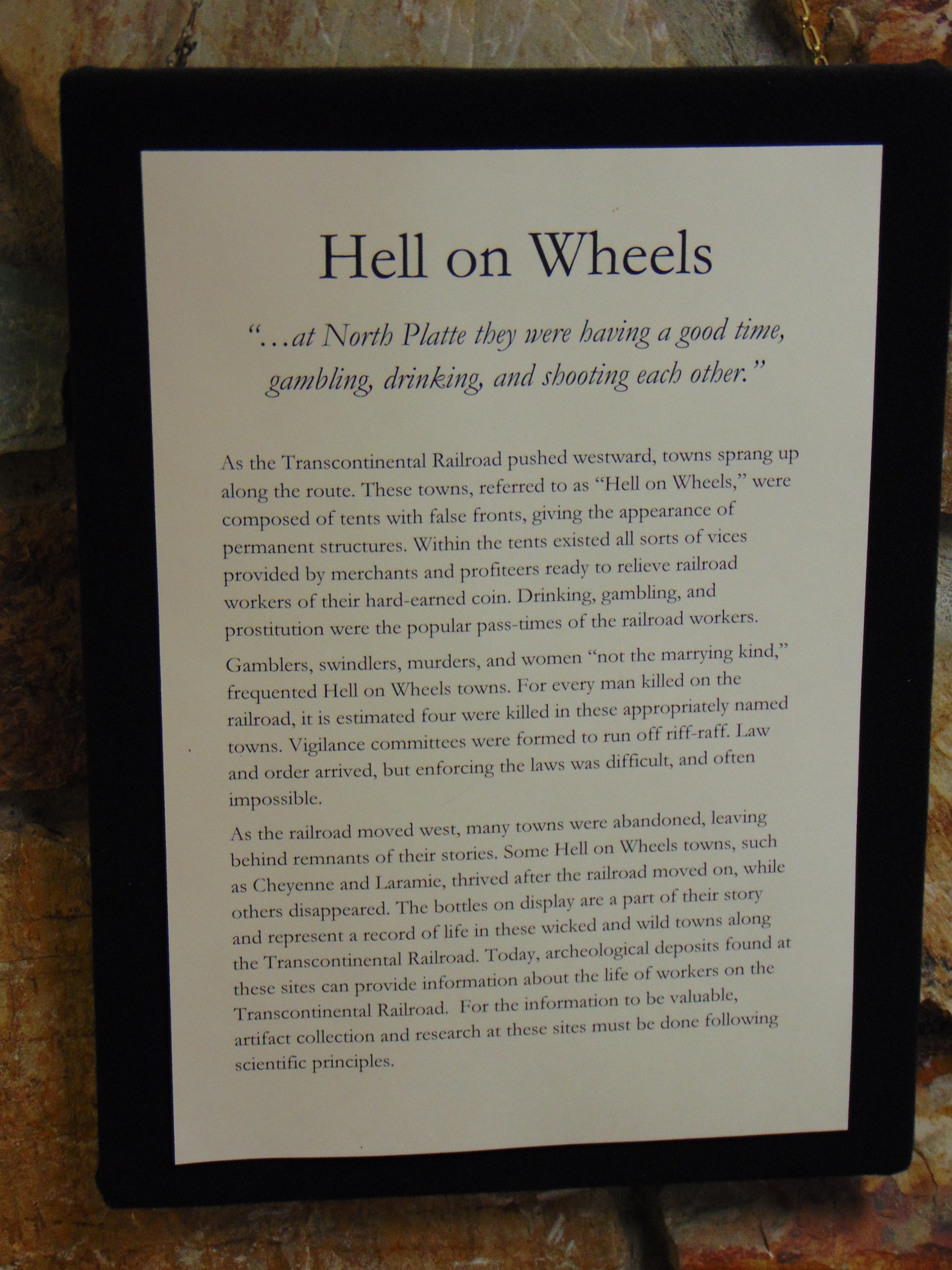
Hell on Wheels plaque in the Golden Spike National Historical Park Visitor Center in Promontory, Utah, February 2017

Hell on Wheels was the itinerant collection of flimsily assembled gambling houses, dance halls, saloons, and brothels that followed the army of Union Pacific Railroad workers westward as they constructed the first transcontinental railroad in 1860s North America. The huge numbers of wage-earning young men working in what was a remote wilderness, far from the constraints of home, provided a lucrative opportunity for business. As the end of the line continually moved westward, Hell on Wheels followed along, reconstructing itself on the outskirts of each town that became, in turn, the center of activity for the Union Pacific's construction work.

== Etymology ==
In 1869, the use of the term "Hell on Wheels" to describe the phenomenon was documented by Springfield, Massachusetts Republican newspaper editor Samuel Bowles.

As the Railroad marched thus rapidly across the broad Continent of plain and mountain, there was improvised a rough and temporary town at its every public stopping-place. As this was changed every thirty or forty days, these settlements were of the most perishable materials,— canvas tents, plain board shanties, and turf-hovels,—pulled down and sent forward for a new career, or deserted as worthless, at every grand movement of the Railroad company. Only a small proportion of their populations had aught to do with the road, or any legitimate occupation. Most were the hangers-on around the disbursements of such a gigantic work, catching the drippings from the feast in any and every form that it was possible to reach them. Restaurant and saloon keepers, gamblers, desperadoes of every grade, the vilest of men and of women made up this “Hell on Wheels”, as it was most aptly termed.

— Samuel Bowles, Our New West, p. 56

== In popular culture ==
John Ford's silent film The Iron Horse (1924) portrayed an idealized image of Hell on Wheels.

AMC's television drama series, Hell On Wheels was originally broadcast from 2011 to 2016 and was set from 1865 to 1869. It centers on the mobile encampment that accompanied the construction of First Transcontinental Railroad, including the Union Pacific company men, surveyors, support workers, laborers, prostitutes, church staff, and mercenaries.

Several scenes in the 2013 Disney film The Lone Ranger briefly take place at a Hell on Wheels brothel.

== Other uses ==
The 2nd Armored Division of the United States Army adopted the nickname "Hell on Wheels" during World War II.

== Additional reading ==
- Ammer, Christine (2013). "Hell on Wheels". The American Heritage Dictionary of Idioms (2nd ed.). Houghton Mifflin Harcourt. p. 209. ISBN 978-0547676586.
- Bowles, Samuel (1869). Our New West. Hartford Pub. Co. (Hartford, CT); J.D. Dennison (New York). p. 56. OCLC 1627933.
- Wishart, David J. (2004). Encyclopedia of the Great Plains. University of Nebraska Press. pp. 170–171. ISBN 9780803247871.
