= John Wirth (television producer) =

American screenwriter and television producer

John Wirth is a television showrunner, producer, and writer. From 2012 to mid-2016, he was the showrunner and executive producer for the American Western series Hell on Wheels. He is also credited as a co-creator, executive producer and writer for the Netflix series, Wu Assassins (2019). Since Season 2, he's been showrunner on the AMC series Dark Winds, developed by Graham Roland.

His previous producer and writer credits include such series as The Cape (2011), the V remake (2009–2011), Terminator: The Sarah Connor Chronicles (2008–2009), Love Monkey (2006), Ghost Whisperer (2005–2010), The District (2001–2003), Nash Bridges (1996–2001), and Remington Steele (1982–1987).

== Hell on Wheels ==
On October 29, 2012, the AMC cable channel renewed Hell on Wheels for a third season. It was also announced that series creators Joe and Tony Gayton would step down as series' showrunners, and series producer/writer/director John Shiban would take over. Following the departure of Shiban, the renewal was put on hold until a replacement could be found. On December 12, 2012, AMC announced that Wirth would be the new showrunner for the show's third season. He remained as such throughout the series' run.

== Wu Assassins ==
On June 29, 2018, it was announced that Wirth was credited as an executive producer, writer and co-creator of the Netflix crime drama Wu Assassins. The series premiered on August 8, 2019.

== Personal life ==
Wirthis married his high school girlfriend, actress and musician Gail Matthius. Their house in Pacific Palisades burned down on January 9, 2025, in the Palisades fire.
