= Chelah Horsdal =

Canadian actress (born 1973)

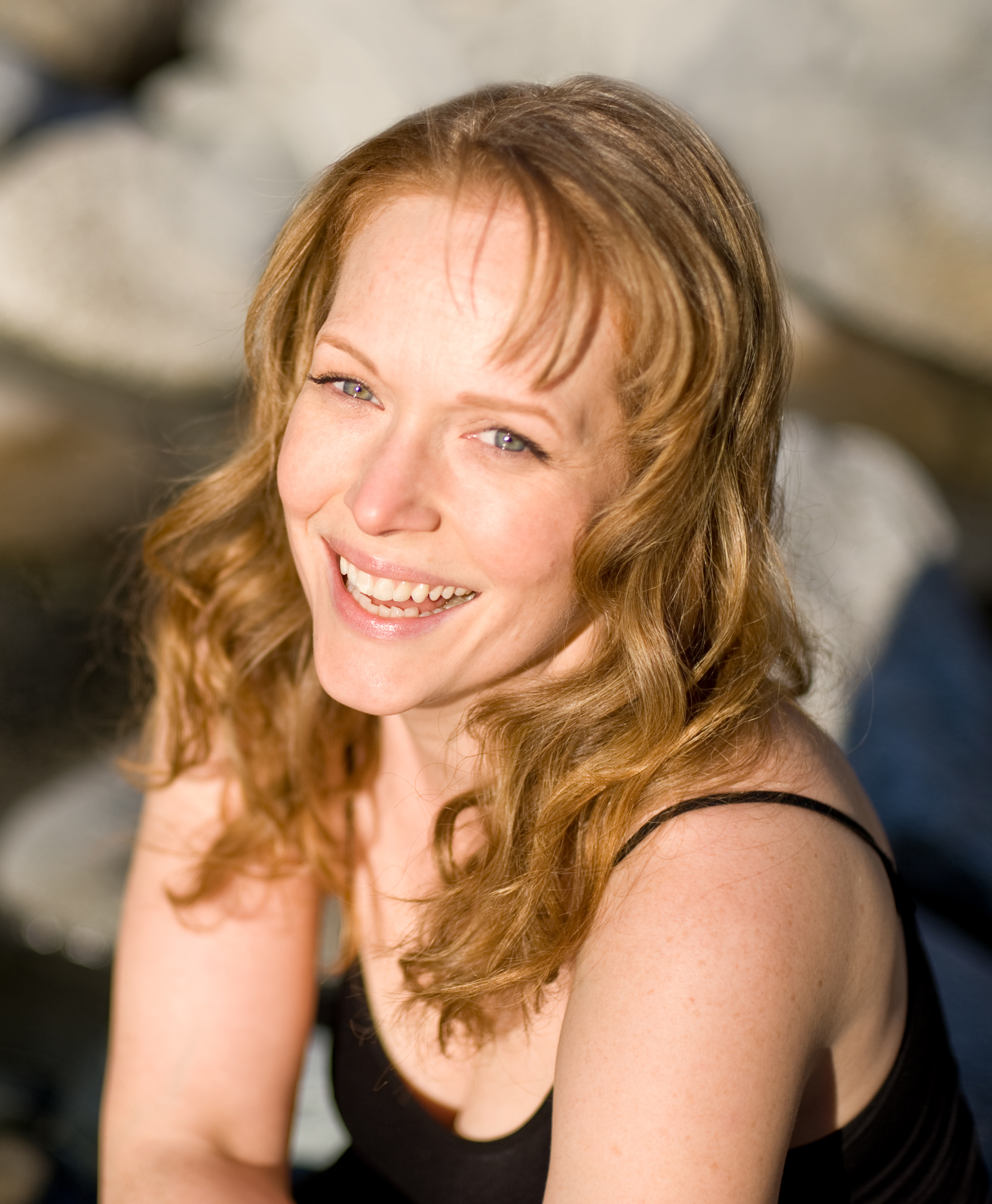
- Horsdal in December 2009
- Born: June 19, 1973 (age 53); Vancouver, British Columbia, Canada
- Occupations: Actress, model
- Years active: 1993; 2002–present
- Father: Paul Valdemar Horsdal
- Website: chelah.com

Chelah Horsdal (born June 19, 1973) is a Canadian actress. She is known for her regular roles in the television series Hell on Wheels, When Calls the Heart, and The Man in the High Castle, recurring roles on Stargate SG-1, Level Up, Arrow, and Star Trek: Discovery, and for her roles in the films Aliens vs. Predator: Requiem, Elegy, Passengers, Possession, Marley & Me: The Puppy Years, and Rise of the Planet of the Apes.

== Early life ==
Horsdal was born in Vancouver, British Columbia. She says she "was born to hippie parents while surrounded by friends and family on the 'farm' Headacres."

She is the daughter of mother Lindsay Whalen and folksinger father Valdy. She grew up with her mother in Kitsilano and attended Bayview Elementary followed by Lord Byng Secondary. She began modelling in locally shot TV shows and commercials at 18, and then lived in the Caribbean for a year.

== Career ==
Horsdal began her acting career in 2002. She has since appeared in more than 75 commercials as well as in films and on television. She has played lead and supporting roles on Hell on Wheels, The Man In the High Castle, When Calls the Heart, Candiland, Patterson's Wager, Three Weeks, Three Kids, On Strike For Christmas, Marley & Me: The Puppy Years, and Lifetime's The Client List. She had lead roles in Lying To Be Perfect and Mrs. Miracle.

Additional credits include leads on the feature Burning Mussolini, Nickelodeon's Gym Teacher: The Movie, co-starring Christopher Meloni and Amy Sedaris, Flirting with Forty with Heather Locklear and the FOX TV pilot The Virgin of Akron, Ohio. Supporting leads include Aliens vs. Predator: Requiem for 20th Century Fox and Possession alongside Sarah Michelle Gellar, as well as Elegy with Ben Kingsley and Penélope Cruz and Rise of the Planet of the Apes with John Lithgow and James Franco.

Her performances in the short films Dark Room (2006) and The Hostage (2010) both earned Leo nominations for Best Performance. Recurring roles include Battlestar Galactica, Exes & Ohs, The L Word, Stargate: SG1, Saved, DaVinci's Inquest, Whistler, Blackstone, Clue and Cartoon Network's Level Up.

The Hostage, for which Horsdal was nominated for Best Actress at the 2011 Leos, co-starred and was produced by Tahmoh Penikett and Aleks Paunovic. Horsdal was nominated for four more Leo Awards for her guest starring turn on Arctic Air (2013), for Hell on Wheels and When Calls the Heart, and for Patterson's Wager.

== Filmography ==
=== Film ===
Year	Title	Role	Notes
2004	The Truth About Miranda	Jan	
2004	Pursued	Sharon	
2005	Dark Room	Alice	Short; Nominated – Leo Award for Best Performance by a Female in a Short Drama
2006	The Pink Panther	Security Guard	
2006	X-Men: The Last Stand	Minivan Mother	
2006	Hollow Man 2	Blind Secretary	
2007	Ashes Fall	Joanna	Short
2007	Aliens vs. Predator: Requiem	Darcy Benson	
2008	Elegy	Susan Reese	
2008	Passengers	Janice	
2009	Alien Trespass	Betsy's Mother	
2009	Possession	Miranda	
2009	Burning Mussolini	Cheryll Witherspoon	
2009	Helen	Kara	
2010	Altitude	Mrs. Taylor	
2010	The Hostage	The Lover	Short; Nominated – Leo Award for Best Performance by a Female in a Short Drama
2010	Birth Day	Patricia	Short
2011	The Cabin in the Woods	Demo Girl	
2011	Marley & Me: The Puppy Years	Carol Grogan	Video
2011	Rise of the Planet of the Apes	Irena	
2011	Something Old, Something New	Bridesmaid	Short
2011	Everything and Everyone	Amanda	
2013	Kill for Me	Maria Klein	Video
2013	Midnight Stallion	Rita Shepard	
2013	Hunting Season	Nancy	
2013	No Clue	Alice	
2014	The Grim Sleeper	Livi Vasquez	
2014	If I Stay	Liddy	
2015	Patterson's Wager	Audrey	Nominated – Leo Award for Best Lead Performance by a Female in a Motion Picture
2015	Even Lambs Have Teeth	Abby	
2015	The Role of Della	Emma	Short
2015	Gord's Brother	Amanda	Short
2016	Candiland	Tess / The Queen	Won – Los Angeles Independent Film Festival Award for Best Actress
2018	Boundaries	Therapist	
2019	Noelle	Dr. Shelley Sussman	
2019	Ash	Gail	
2019	Last Stand to Nowhere	Wylona Earp	Short
2020	Spontaneous	Denise Hovemeyer	
2026	Backrooms	TBA	Completed

=== Television ===
Year	Title	Role	Notes
2003	Andromeda	Misabo Ahm	"Pieces of Eight"
2004	Still Life	Tammi	"Not Fade Away"
2004	Five Days to Midnight	Stefani	TV miniseries; 5 episodes
2004	The Dead Zone	Janet Miller	"Collision"
2004	Cold Squad	Dr. Walker	"Voices Over Water"
2004–06	Stargate SG-1	Lt. Womack	Recurring role; 5 episodes
2005	Renegadepress.com	Mrs. Annie Tropek	"The Power of Love"
2005	The 4400	Jeanine	"Wake-Up Call"
2005	Criminal Minds	Heather Woodland	"Extreme Aggressor"
2005	Reunion	Jane Kelsey	"1988"
2005	Masters of Horror	Frances Elwood	"Dreams in the Witch-House"
2005	Smallville	Dr. McCann	"Lexmas"
2005	Supernatural	Librarian	"Hook Man"
2006	The Evidence	Ivy Beckman	"Five Little Indians"
2006	Fallen	Lori Corbett	TV movie
2006	Whistler	Janet	"The Burden of Truth", "Will the Real Beck...?", "Meltdown"
2006	Saved	Gail Esterbrook	"A Shock to the System", "Tango"
2006–08	The L Word	Sally	Recurring role; 5 episodes
2007	The Virgin of Akron, Ohio	Juliet	"Pilot"
2007	Psych	Beth	"Game, Set... Muuurder?"
2007	A Decent Proposal	Cynthia Lewis	TV film
2007	Battlestar Galactica	Didi Cassidy	"Crossroads: Parts 1 & 2"
2007	Crossroads: A Story of Forgiveness	Cindy	TV film
2007	Perfect Child	Jen	TV film
2007	Bionic Woman	Suicidal Woman	Episode: "Paradise Lost"
2007–11	Exes and Ohs	Lauren Brooks	Recurring role; 3 episodes
2008	Robson Arms	Shania	"Cherchez la Femme"
2008	Every Second Counts	Mrs. Alcott	TV film
2008	Gym Teacher: The Movie	Winnie Bleeker	TV film
2008	Stargate: Atlantis	Erran	"Tracker"
2008	Flirting with Forty	Anne	TV film
2008	Past Lies	Danielle	TV film
2008	Inseparable	Sara	TV film
2009	Come Dance at My Wedding	Nancy Reed	TV film
2009	The Guard	Kathy	"Out of the Woods"
2009	Eureka	Mary-Beth Curtis	"Insane in the P-Brane"
2009	Defying Gravity	Dr. Tina Winkler	"Bacon"
2009	Stargate Universe	Inman	"Variety"
2009	Mrs. Miracle	Kate Preston	TV film
2010	Lying to Be Perfect	Nancy	TV film
2010	The Client List	Doreen	TV film
2010	On Strike for Christmas	Sharon	TV film
2010	Life Unexpected	Prosecutor	Episode: "Stand Taken"
2010	Betwixt	Vanessa	TV film
2011	Identity	Lisa Curtis	TV film
2011	Fairly Legal	Brooke Keller	"Priceless"
2011	Iron Golem	Deputy Jenny	TV film
2011	Endgame	Olivia Davis	"Fearful Symmetry"
2011	Three Weeks, Three Kids	Mandy Norton	TV film
2011	Clue	Headmistress Kroger	Enter the Order of Black, School for Conspiracy
2011	Wishing Well	Kara Turner	TV film Nominated – UBCP/ACTRA Award for Best Actress
2011–13	Blackstone	Angie Gold	Recurring role; 4 episodes
2012	The Killing	Kellie Hopkins	"Openings"
2012	Emily Owens, M.D.	Marian Kramden	"Pilot"
2012	It's Christmas, Carol!	Tanya	TV film
2012	The Selection	Magda Singer	Unsold TV pilot
2012–13	Level Up	Barbara	Recurring role; 11 episodes
2012–14	Arrow	Kate Spencer	Recurring role; 5 episodes
2013	Rita	Alicia	TV film
2013	I Am Victor	Samantha	TV film
2013	Arctic Air	Tara	"Dangerous Cargo"; Nominated – Leo Award for Best Guest Performance by a Female in a Dramatic Series (2013)
2013	Motive	Deana Mitchell	"Against All Odds"
2013	Package Deal	Megan	"Kangaroo Court"
2013–16	Hell on Wheels	Maggie Palmer	Main role; (14 episodes); Nominated – Leo Award for Best Supporting Performance by a Female in a Dramatic Series (2015); Nominated – Leo Award for Best Supporting Performance by a Female in a Dramatic Series (2016)
2014	Sole Custody	Ann	TV film
2014	When Calls the Heart	Cat Montgomery	Main role; (10 episodes); Nominated – Leo Award for Best Supporting Performance by a Female in a Dramatic Series (2015)
2014	Cedar Cove	Dr. Carmen	"Letting Go: Parts 1 & 2"
2015	The Returned	Kris	Recurring role; 5 episodes
2015	Proof	Colleen Seavers	"Pilot"
2015	Unreal	Louise	"Fly", "Savior"
2015	Falling Skies	Alicia	"Respite"
2015–2019	The Man in the High Castle	Helen Smith	Main role; (35 episodes); Won – Leo Award for Best Supporting Performance by a Female in a Dramatic Series (2017)
2016	Girlfriends' Guide to Divorce	Marianne Gallagher	"Let Her Eat Cake"
2016	Pretty Little Addict	Donna Phillips	TV film
2016-2017	You Me Her	Lori Matherfield	Recurring role; 15 episodes
2017	Rogue	Kathryn Farese	"Pool Boy"
2017	When We Rise	Emily	"1.3"
2018	The Good Doctor	Tessa	"Seven Reasons"
2019	The 100	Simone Lightbourne	"Red Sun Rising"
2021–2023	Firefly Lane	Margie Mularkey	Recurring role; 17 episodes
2021–2024	Star Trek: Discovery	President Laira Rillak	Recurring role, 12 episodes
2023	Prom Pact	Mrs. Lansing	TV Movie
2026	Sheriff Country	Judge Merry MacRae	"The Aftermath"
2026	Off Campus	Carrie	Recurring role, 3 episodes
