= Ben Esler =

Australian actor

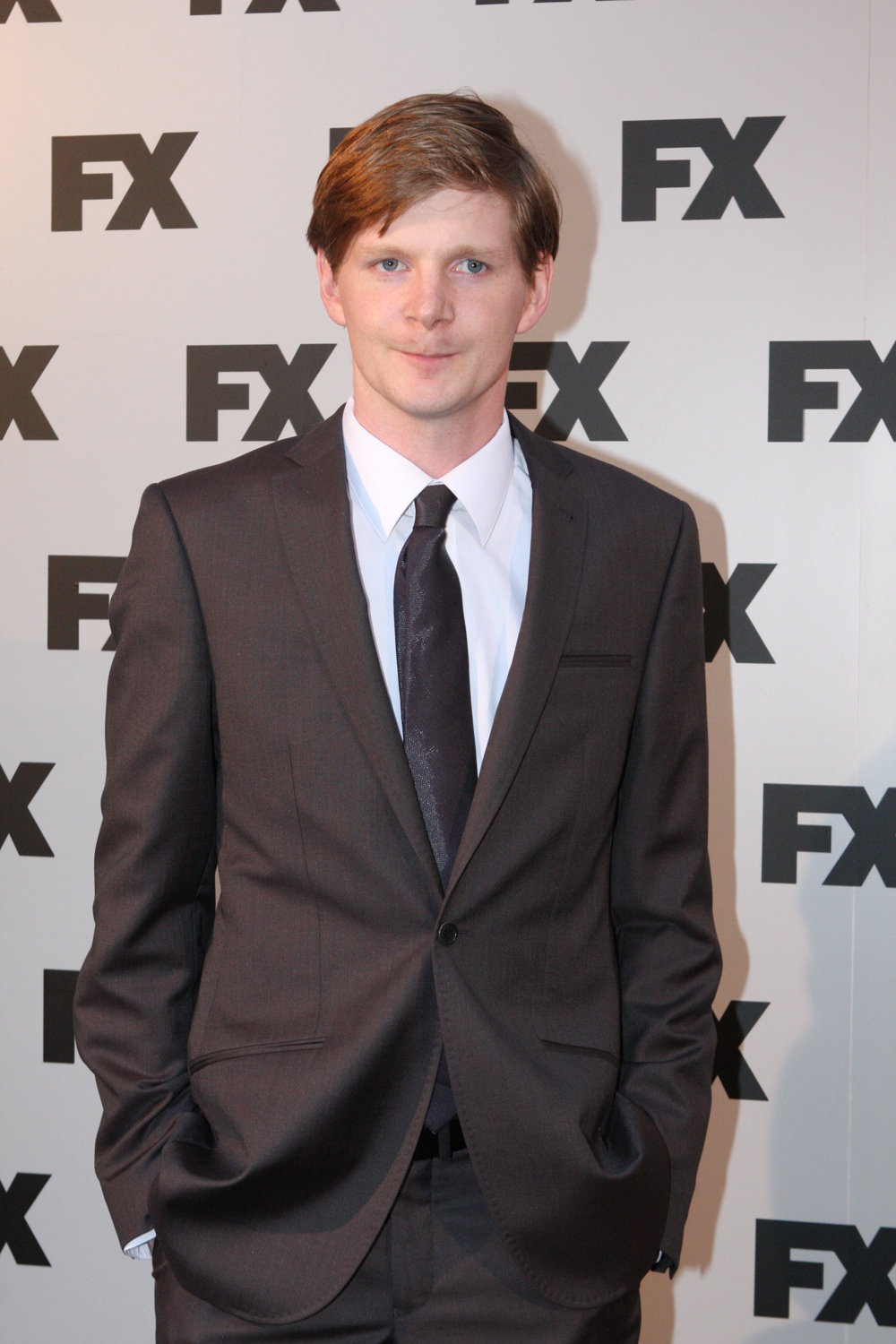
- Born: Benjamin Esler; 1983 (age 42–43); Melbourne, Victoria, Australia
- Occupation: Actor
- Years active: 2004–present

Ben Esler (born 1982) is an Australian actor and screenwriter, best known for playing Sean McGinnes in the AMC television series Hell on Wheels, as well as for his role as war hero Chuck Tatum in HBO's The Pacific. Esler is a writer and cast member of the 2023 NatGeo and Disney+ series A Small Light which tells the story of Miep Gies, the young woman who protected Anne Frank and her family during the Holocaust.

== Early life ==
Esler was born and raised in Melbourne, Australia, the son of Rosemary and Murray Esler. He is a graduate of the University of Melbourne, where he obtained a master's degree in Applied Ethics as well as a diploma in Professional Ethics. While a student at university, he wrote and performed sketch comedy for the long running University of Melbourne Law Revue.

== Career ==
Esler began his career appearing in the popular Australian police drama Blue Heelers and the award-winning ABC Australia made-for-TV movie Curtin. In 2010 Esler appeared in HBO's Tom Hanks, Gary Goetzman and Steven Spielberg-produced and Emmy Award-winning miniseries The Pacific as Private First Class Charles "Chuck" Tatum. After portraying Tatum, he was invited to contribute an afterword to Tatum's World War II memoir, Red Blood, Black Sand, which was used as source material for the series. The book, including Esler's contribution, was re-released by Penguin Publishing in May 2012. He was a series regular for the first three seasons of Hell on Wheels, a Western focusing on the construction of the transcontinental railroad, on AMC, Esler appeared in the role of Sean, an Irish immigrant and ruthless businessman, seeking his fortune in the American West.

In 2016 he appeared in The Jury in the role of Ernest. That same year he played the role of Charlie Quinn in the SyFy Channel television series The Magicians, based upon the book series by author Lev Grossman. In 2017 Esler was a regular cast member in Welcome to OxBlood; a pilot from Executive Producer Marc Cherry and ABC, portraying the role of Hollis, a man who cares for his disabled grandmother while kidnapping women and keeping them in her house.

In 2019 he starred in the Kriv Stenders directed Australian Vietnam-era war movie Danger Close as Ken Deacon. In 2020 he played Jed in Endings, Beginnings for director Drake Doremus. He is a cast member and writer on the upcoming series A Small Light for Natgeo and Disney+.

== Filmography ==
| Year | Film/Series | Role |
|---|---|---|
| 2023 | Winner | Warren |
| 2022 | A Small Light | Writer/Father Dirksen |
| 2020 | Blue Ridge | Thompson |
| 2019 | Endings, Beginnings | Jed |
| 2019 | Danger Close: The Battle of Long Tan | Deacon |
| 2017 | SEAL Team | Erik |
| 2017 | Welcome to OxBlood | Hollis Polit |
| 2016 | The Jury | Ernest |
| 2016 | The Magicians | Charlie |
| 2015 | The Morning After | George |
| 2011–2013 | Hell on Wheels | Sean McGinnes, 28 Episodes |
| 2010 | The Pacific | Charles "Chuck" Tatum |
| 2007 | Curtin | John Curtin Jnr |
| 2004–2005 | Blue Heelers | Wayne Dixon/Bobbie Davies, 2 Episodes |
