= Jennifer Ferrin =

American actress

- Born: February 25, 1979 (age 47); Lawrenceville, Georgia, U.S.
- Years active: 2002–present
- Spouse: Zachary Bliss (m. 2014)

Jennifer Ferrin (born February 25, 1979) is an American actress.

== Early life and education ==
Ferrin was born in Lawrenceville, Georgia.

== Career ==
Ferrin played the younger version of Vanessa Redgrave's character Esther in the Hallmark Hall of Fame film The Locket. She guest starred in the 2002 season finale of Dawson's Creek. Ferrin's most notable role to date is that of Jennifer Munson Kasnoff Donovan on the daytime soap opera As the World Turns, played from 2003 to 2006. She was nominated twice for a Daytime Emmy Award.

In 2006, she landed a recurring role on the primetime show 3 lbs, cancelled and pulled off-air after three episodes. Ferrin was one of the four actors starring in the U.S. premiere productions of The 39 Steps, Patrick Barlow's stage adaptation of the Alfred Hitchcock film, in Boston in 2007 and New York in 2008

Ferrin also played Detective Sam Tyler's mother in the American version of Life On Mars. In January 2011, she began her role of Dana Faraday on the NBC superhero drama series The Cape, cancelled and pulled off-air after 9 episodes. She also had a two episode stint on Royal Pains and was recurring character Molly on The Following. She portrayed Rebecca Mason, the deceased wife of lead character Tom Mason (Noah Wyle), in a dream episode of the TNT science-fiction drama series Falling Skies, on July 21, 2013; Ferrin appeared again on Falling Skies for the series' fifth-season premiere on June 28, 2015.

She became a series regular in the third season of AMC's Hell on Wheels.

In Steven Soderbergh's Mosaic, a murder mystery released in 2017 as an interactive iOS/Android app and then in 2018 as an HBO television drama, Ferrin played Petra Neill, a point-of-view character. She also was in ABCs cancelled time travel series Time After Time where she played a doctor trying to develop her father's research further.

As of 2021, she began a recurring role on CBS' The Equalizer, playing Avery Grafton, a DA who is determined to seek out and stop Robyn McCall's vigilantism as it also threatens her political future.

== Personal life ==
Ferrin is married to interior designer Zachary Bliss, whom she met in 2009 and wed in 2014. The couple reside in Amagansett, New York.

== Filmography ==
=== Film ===
Year	Title	Role	Notes
2010	Nonames	Cori	
2010	Sex and the City 2	Patience	

=== Television ===
Year	Title	Role	Notes
2002	Dawson's Creek	Nervous girl	Episode: "Swan Song"
2002	The Locket	Young Esther	Television film
2003–2006	As the World Turns	Jennifer Munson Donovan	264 episodes
2006	Rescue Me	Sarah	2 episodes
2006	3 lbs	Penny Marx	2 episodes
2007	The Kill Point	Chloe	8 episodes
2008–2009	Life on Mars	Ruth Tyler / Rose Tyler	5 episodes
2009	Fringe	Susan Pratt / Nancy Lewis	Episode: "The Road Not Taken"
2009	Law & Order: Special Victims Unit	Rena West	Episode: "Unstable"
2009	Bunker Hill	ADA Chase Cabot	Television film
2010	White Collar	Melissa Cartwright	Episode: "Vital Signs"
2010	Nurse Jackie	Georgia	2 episodes
2011	The Cape	Dana Faraday	10 episodes
2011	Boardwalk Empire	Carolyn Rothstein	Episode: "What Does the Bee Do?"
2011	Unforgettable	Janine Barlow	Episode: "Spirited Away"
2011, 2012	Royal Pains	Kate Murray	2 episodes
2012	The Good Wife	Elaine Middleton	Episode: "Bitcoin for Dummies"
2012	Elementary	Rebecca Ellison	Episode: "While You Were Sleeping"
2013	Over/Under	Hailey	Television film
2013	Deception	Hannay	2 episodes
2013	The Following	Molly	5 episodes
2013	Rewind	Dr. Lyndsay Bryce	Television film
2013	Person of Interest	Natalie Boal	Episode: "The Perfect Mark"
2013	Mother's Day	Gwen	Television film
2013–2015	Falling Skies	Rebecca Mason	6 episodes
2013–2016	Hell on Wheels	Louise Ellison	24 episodes
2014–2015	The Knick	Abigail Alford	10 episodes
2016	Falling Water	Busy	4 episodes
2017	Time After Time	Brooke Monroe	7 episodes
2017–2018	Mosaic	Petra Neill	9 episodes
2018	Sneaky Pete	Joyce Roby	8 episodes
2018	Homeland	Charlotte	2 episodes
2018	Rise	Denise Strickland	6 episodes
2019	The Passage	Elizabeth Lear	4 episodes
2019	The Blacklist	Anna McMahon	8 episodes
2019	Instinct	Dr. Alexandra Becker	Episode: "Stay Gold"
2019	God Friended Me	Madeline	Episode: "The Last Grenelle"
2019	Evil	Judith Lemonhead	Episode: "Exorcism Part 2"
2021–2024	The Equalizer	D.A. Avery Grafton	Recurring role, 10 episodes
2022–2024	Pretty Little Liars	Martha Beasley	Recurring role, 13 episodes
2024	American Horror Stories	Lilly Mulling	Episode: "X"
2026	Maximum Pleasure Guaranteed	Joyce	Recurring role
2026	56 Days	Kristi Martin	
