= The Railroad Job =

- Hell on Wheels episode
- Episode no.: Season 2 Episode 5
- Directed by: Michael Nankin
- Written by: Mark Richard
- Production code: 205
- Original air date: September 9, 2012

Guest appearances
- Ryan Robbins as Hawkins; Grainger Hines as Doc Whitehead; April Telek as Nell; Dohn Norwood as Psalms; Robin McLeavy as Eva

Episode chronology
← Previous "Scabs"	Next → "Purged Away with Blood"
- Hell on Wheels (season 2)

"The Railroad Job" is the fifth episode of the second season of the American television drama series Hell on Wheels, which aired on September 9, 2012 on AMC. The fifteenth episode of the series is written by Mark Richard and directed by Michael Nankin. In the episode, Cullen's (Anson Mount) former train-robbing gang sets their sights on Hell on Wheels and its safe. Elam (Common) struggles to maintain order and has to rely on Cullen's help, causing the town to shun him. The Swede (Christopher Heyerdahl) continues to prepare Reverend Cole (Tom Noonan) for his prophetic "war".

== Plot ==
Hawkins (Ryan Robbins) outlines his plan to rob $50,000 in payroll from Hell on Wheels' railway office to his bandit gang. He informs them that Cullen now works for the railroad. Doc (Grainger Hines) is surprised to hear his friend is alive. As they prepare for the robbery, Hawkins orders him to stay behind in case anyone gets wounded and to prevent Doc from alerting Cullen.

Chained to an anvil, Reverend Cole reaches for a liquor bottle, which the Swede tosses away, reminding the preacher that he made the Swede promise to keep him chained. The Swede suggests that he finish his manifesto, as Hawkins and his gang ride into town behind them. At the saloon, a bandit nods at Elam and comments about his being allowed to drink there. Elam reaches for his gun, but Hawkins appears and apologizes before the situation worsened. He buys Elam a drink and the men leave. Elam, who recognized the bandit’s Griswold pistol, tells Durant (Colm Meaney) of the coincidence that the payroll arrives the same day the strangers do, as well as two Rebels buying a black man a drink. Durant tells him to arm every man in town and send for Cullen. Elam takes the men to the armory, but finds it empty. He sends them after other guns and then recruits Psalms (Dohn Norwood), who is coughing up blood from his previous fight with Elam, to cover the road.

At the railway office, Hawkins and his cohorts order Lily (Dominique McElligott) to open the safe. Durant shoots a bandit, and Hawkins shoots Durant in the gut. Cullen arrives to find the town under siege, while Hawkins holds Lily at gunpoint as she opens the safe. The bandits shove the money into a bag. Cullen finds Elam and they team up. The Swede hears the gunfire and calls it "trumpets" announcing Cole's prophecy. Psalms kills the bandit carrying the payroll, then falls to the ground in pain. One of the prostitutes runs out to grab money as it floats through the air, and Nell (April Telek) is shot pulling her back. The McGinnes brothers (Ben Esler, Phil Burke) gun down Nell's killer.

Inside the railway office, Lily sees Hawkins struggling with reloading his gun and shoots him. He staggers into the street and is shot by Cullen. Lily cries out that Durant is dying and Cullen tortures Hawkins into revealing Doc's location. He leaves, telling Elam to lock Hawkins up. Eva (Robin McLeavy) helps Lily tend to Durant's wound, while Elam throws Hawkins into the prison car. At the bandit camp, Cullen finds Doc and informs him that people are hurt and the bandits are dead, then orders Doc to follow him back to town. They arrive at the railway office, where Doc tries to extract the bullet as Durant screams in pain.

Outside, Lily tells Cullen that she felt a moment of relief that Durant might not live. Doc tells them Durant needs a more qualified surgeon, but believes a train ride to Chicago would kill him. Cullen pulls Doc aside, upset that the group never went to Mexico. He asks if that was ever the plan and Doc does not answer. Elam and Cullen take Hawkins to the cemetery and kneel him in front of an open grave. He is given a chance to say his last words. He asks Cullen why he is at Hell on Wheels and then lectures him on betrayal. Hawkins comments about Cullen being friends with Elam and Elam shoots him in the head. Cullen kicks his body into the grave. In town, Doc tells a semi-conscious Durant that the bullet is lodged in his spine, and then tells Lily he thinks Durant might be strong enough to risk a train ride.

The Swede shaves off Cole's beard. Cole asks why the man saved him. The Swede leads him to a coffin, opens it to reveal the rifles from the armory, and quotes the Bible: "A great sword is given unto you." At the saloon, the townsfolk honor Nell and Cullen. Elam enters, but is turned away because he was seen hiding during the robbery.

He approaches the freedmen and offers two bottles of good liquor to join them. Psalms accepts, and Elam asks him what would happen to the freedmen if Durant died. Psalms turns the question on Elam, asking how long he thinks he would last without Durant to protect him. Psalms laughs and Elam joins in. As Cullen drinks alone, Lily hands him a telegram calling for Doc's execution. Cullen protests that the man only held the bandits' horses. Lily says they seek anyone aiding and abetting the bandits.

== Reception ==
=== Ratings ===
"The Railroad Job" was watched by 2.62 million viewers and received a 0.6 rating among viewers aged 18–49, the season's highest ratings to date.

=== Critical reception ===
The episode received unfavorable reviews. The A.V. Club's Alasdair Wilkins gave the episode a C+ grade, stating: "Hell On Wheels doesn't need to be thematically rich or have complex, multifaceted characters to be a decent show. "Durant, Nebraska" already provided a blueprint for the show's success as shameless, over-the-top pulp, and the shootout taps into some of that goofily lurid sense of fun. There's been stuff to like in the subsequent episodes, such as the gleeful nihilism of "Slaughterhouse", Cullen's low-rent Machiavellianism in "Scabs", and the heist in tonight's episode, but the long-form storytelling remains ponderous and, worse, seemingly pointless." Ross Bonaime of Paste gave it a 6.0 rating, stating "'The Railroad Job' points out the largest flaws in Hell on Wheels. It can't seem to remember the past and has no interest in the future. With the exception of Durant’s gunshot wound, it looks like this episode won’t have much influence in the long run of things except as another distraction from the railroad building."
