= Durant, Nebraska =

- Hell on Wheels episode
- Episode no.: Season 2 Episode 2
- Directed by: Adam Davidson
- Written by: John Shiban
- Production code: 202
- Original air date: August 19, 2012

Guest appearances
- Chad Nobert as Prison Guard; Alex Zahara as Lt. Weston; Kasha Kropinski as Ruth; Grainger Hines as Doc Whitehead; Brian Jensen as Schmidt

Episode chronology
| ← Previous "Viva la Mexico" | Next → "Slaughterhouse" |
- Hell on Wheels (season 2)

"Durant, Nebraska" is the second episode of the second season of the American television drama series Hell on Wheels, which aired on August 19, 2012 on AMC. The twelfth episode of the series is written by John Shiban, and directed by Adam Davidson. In the episode, Thomas Durant (Colm Meaney) takes some men to a ransacked town of his namesake, where he learns the Sioux Nation has declared war on him. Cullen Bohannon (Anson Mount) is freed from the Union Army prison by an unlikely ally. Lily Bell (Dominique McElligott) promises Eva (Robin McLeavy) justice in the prostitute's murder, which Elam (Common) investigates.

== Plot ==
A band of Indian braves ransack Durant, Nebraska and set it on fire, while Eva hides and watches.

At the Fort Larned jailhouse, Cullen is told he is guilty of armed robbery and sedition, but his death sentence will be commuted to life imprisonment if he reveals his cohorts' names. A belligerent Cullen refuses to cooperate, even when his head is repeatedly submerged in water.

The Swede (Christopher Heyerdahl) delivers a telegraphed message to a sleeping Thomas Durant, who dismisses him. Durant then tells Lily, who lies in his bed, of the Indian massacre. Durant, Joseph (Eddie Spears) and a crew of armed men later board the train on a counterattack mission. After the train reaches the burning town and its survivors, Toole (Duncan Ollerenshaw) tells Durant that nine people were killed. Eva adds the attackers were not Cheyenne. When a band of Indians appears in the distance, Joseph sees that they are from the Sioux Nation and are sending Durant a message that he is now at war with them.

Doc Whitehead (Grainger Hines) visits Cullen in jail. Cullen confesses that he murdered an innocent man and, when Doc attempts to comfort him, adds that he feels nothing about the act. Officers later drag a bound and blindfolded Cullen to a barn. Alone, Cullen takes off the hood and tries to escape but is surprised when Durant appears, smiling. Durant produces two documents: a warrant for Cullen's execution and a pardon. He claims that Cullen has "unfinished business" and then asks him to choose life or death.

Over tea, Eva tells Lily she wants justice brought upon the man who murdered the prostitute. Lily agrees but stresses that it will be a difficult request to fulfill. Lily later joins Elam at the saloon and discreetly asks him to deal with the man who killed the prostitute. Elam refuses until she mentions that the request came from Eva.

At church, Joseph and Ruth (Kasha Kropinski) distribute clothes and food to the Durant residents. A drunken Reverend Cole (Tom Noonan) approaches and claims he is ready to preach, but Ruth asks him to leave and Joseph blocks his entry. Later that night, Reverend Cole drinks by the Swede's bonfire. Cole prophesizes that the railroad will wipe out the Indians, but the Swede argues that the Sioux's legendary "White Spirit" will prevail. He shows Cole a sign: a sabre-toothed animal skull he dug up by the riverside.

Cullen is brought to Durant's train and shackled to a bench. Durant punches Cullen for robbing his railroad and they both later wonder if they have made the right decision. When Durant gets too close, Cullen wraps the chain around his neck, challenging him to ask for his own stay of execution. Durant holds out, but Cullen releases him. Durant says that sometimes one has to make a deal with the devil. Cullen asks who the devil is in this deal. Durant tosses him the key to his shackles and exits the train car.

At Hell on Wheels, Elam confronts Schmidt (Brian Jensen), accusing him of murdering the prostitute. A brazen Schmidt scoffs at Elam's accusations. Elam draws his gun and threatens to shoot Schmidt, but Schmidt dismisses the threat, saying that a gunshot would attract too much attention. Elam agrees and walks away. Schmidt then inexplicably admits to killing the prostitute. Elam pulls out a knife and stabs him repeatedly in the stomach.

When Cullen and Durant arrive at Hell on Wheels, Durant says that he trusts Cullen's word that he will not leave town, acknowledging an approaching Elam and saying he could always get Elam to shoot him. Elam welcomes Cullen, telling him he will need a gun. As Cullen makes his way through Hell on Wheels, Lily, Joseph, Sean, and various other residents are all stunned by his arrival. He passes a mob of people throwing stones at Schmidt's corpse, which bears a sign that reads "woman killer." Cullen arrives at his new quarters, the Swede's old caboose. As he looks out from the doorway, he sees the Swede, who gives him a knowing smile and walks away.

== Reception ==
=== Ratings ===
"Durant, Nebraska" was watched by 2.31 million viewers, a slight drop from the season premiere, and showed no change in its 0.6 rating among viewers aged 18–49.

=== Critical reception ===
The episode received positive reviews. The A.V. Club's Alasdair Wilkins gave "Durant, Nebraska" a B+ grade, calling it his "favorite Hell On Wheels episode yet," adding the episode "is often silly and over-the-top. This isn't great (or perhaps even good) television by most conventional definitions, but I still enjoyed the hell out of it on its own slightly ridiculous terms." Sean McKenna of TV Fanatic rated the episode with 4.5 out of 5 stars, saying, "This second episode really captured the whole atmosphere of the show and provided the perfect seeds for what is to come."

== Production ==
- "Durant, Nebraska" (a nod to the real-life Durant, Polk County, Nebraska) is in the show is largely owned by its founder, Thomas C. "Doc" Durant. The real-life Durant, Polk County, Nebraska is an unincorporated community established when the Union Pacific Railroad was extended to that point, during the building of the First transcontinental railroad.
- In season 3, General Ulysses S. Grant tells Cullen Bohannon that Durant, Nebraska was renamed Cheyenne, Wyoming (also a real city), after Thomas C. "Doc" Durant was ruined. Multiple plot lines in season 3 and season 4 prominently feature the renamed community.
- As in the TV series, the location of the real-life Cheyenne, Wyoming was chosen as the point where the Union Pacific Railroad crossed Crow Creek, a tributary of the South Platte River. The real-life city's rapid growth, due to the construction of the Union Pacific Railroad, which reached Cheyenne on November 13, 1867, earned Cheyenne, Wyoming the nickname "Magic City of the Plains". This is referenced in season 4, episode 2 ("Escape from the Garden"), when Brigadier General John Allen Campbell tells newspaper woman Louise Ellison: "Cheyenne has been touted as "The Magic City of the Plains". It's my job to govern it into a new era, as I did in the South following the war."
