= Purged Away with Blood =

- Hell on Wheels episode
- Episode no.: Season 2 Episode 6
- Directed by: Joe Gayton
- Written by: Tony Gayton; Tom Brady
- Production code: 206
- Original air date: September 16, 2012

Guest appearances
- Darcy Singer as Yellow Dog; Grainger Hines as Doc Whitehead; Kasha Kropinski as Ruth; Peter Strand Rumpel as Train Engineer

Episode chronology
← Previous "The Railroad Job"	Next → "The White Spirit"
- Hell on Wheels (season 2)

"Purged Away with Blood" is the sixth episode of the second season of the American television drama series Hell on Wheels, which aired on September 16, 2012 on AMC. The sixteenth episode of the series is co-written by series co-creator Tony Gayton and Tom Brady and directed by series co-creator Joe Gayton. In the episode, The Swede (Christopher Heyerdahl) reveals himself to be the "White Spirit" as he aids the Sioux in their war with the railroad. Reverend Cole (Tom Noonan) also plays his role and hijacks the train taking Durant (Colm Meaney), Eva (Robin McLeavy), and Doc Whitehead (Grainger Hines) to Chicago.

== Plot ==
The Swede and Reverend Cole meet a band of Sioux Indians. Leader Yellow Dog (Darcy Singer) gives a white wolf pelt to The Swede, who explains to Cole that the Sioux rescued him after he was chased out of town. He confirms that he is the "White Spirit", and the two distribute rifles to the Indians.

While the train to Chicago is being prepared, Durant hallucinates about his son. Lily (Dominique McElligott) informs him that she has telegraphed his wife, who will meet him when he arrives. He begs her to stay with him, but she insists on remaining behind to oversee railroad business. Elam (Common) tries to stop a pregnant Eva from escorting Durant as his nurse, but she says her "condition" is not his concern and explains that Durant is paying her, just like he is paying Elam.

Cullen (Anson Mount) wants to flee with Doc, but Lily says Durant could die without Doc to treat him. Cullen argues that Doc will die if he does not leave town and adds that if Durant dies, Lily will not have to share Durant's bed anymore. Appalled, she slaps him. Doc tells Cullen he will not abandon Durant despite the death warrant. Cullen relents, making Doc promise to get off the train before it reaches Chicago. On the train, Eva tells Doc that Durant's fever is down.

At church, Joseph shows Ruth (Kasha Kropinski) a Bible passage that Cole marked and left for him: "Jesus said to them, if you don't have a sword, sell your cloak to buy one." They ponder its meaning. A track explosion halts Durant's train and a band of armed Sioux board, followed by a sword-wielding, Bible-quoting Cole, who orders Durant to publish his manifesto on the front page of the New-York Tribune or else all hostages will die. A reluctant Durant agrees.

Back in town, Lily shows Cullen a telegram sent from Durant's train. Recognizing the text as John Brown propaganda and recalling Cole mentioning John Brown in the past, Cullen leaves the office in haste. He later requests permission to board the hijacked train. Once inside, he tells Cole that killing innocent people will not save the Indians. He suggests that Cole pray, knowing God would lead him to do the right thing, As he leaves, Cole shouts, "Blood is God here!" and impales the engineer (Peter Strand Rumpel) on his sword.

Lily arrives and confers with Cullen and Elam. Cullen says Cole is sober but insane and advocates taking Cole's train by force. Lily insists on negotiating. Inside, Durant speaks with Cole about the sacrifices they have made to achieve their goals. Cole admits to being a terrible father, to which Durant agrees that "great men often are" and adds that his wife never forgave him for it. Cole says the manifesto is his legacy to his children, like Durant's legacy is the railroad. But Durant says Cole is "on the wrong side of history" and will be vilified.

Cullen and Elam fire on the hijacked train with rifles, hitting the guards. Inside, Eva and Doc grab the wounded Yellow Dog and hold him until he bleeds out. Cole holds Doc at gunpoint, prompting Cullen and Elam to stand down. Cole retreats inside but states that he wants to see his children. While keeping watch on Cole's train, Elam confides to Cullen that Eva is carrying his baby. Lily and Joseph find Ruth at church and explain the situation. Ruth claims that she can do nothing, but Joseph begs her to do this one last thing for him, even though she does not love him anymore.

Outside the train, The Swede escorts authorities toward the train car. Cullen curses him for leading them to Doc. Inside, Cole tearfully apologizes to Ruth for being a bad father. Crying, she forgives and embraces him. Joseph then tells Cole that Jesus will only forgive him if he lets the hostages go. Cole whispers that he is going to kill them all, but is doing it all for him. Joseph tells him he loves him, then stabs him in the gut with a knife, and he falls to the floor, only able to gasp "Behold your legacy" before he dies. Ruth, shocked, collapses sobbing over her father's corpse.

Joseph exits the train car and hands Cullen the bloody knife. The authorities take Doc into custody. As the track is repaired, Elam tells Eva they need to discuss the baby when she comes back from Chicago. "You mean your baby," she says. A weak Durant tells Lily that he needs his wife's forgiveness for "everything." She says goodbye and leaves. Doc asks Cullen to be the one who executes him, adding that there is no honor in the way he has been living, but he wishes to die with some. Doc kneels and urges Cullen to be strong. Cullen closes his eyes and shoots Doc in the back of the head.

== Production ==
Regarding his character's demise in this episode, Tom Noonan stated: "I sort of knew all along that might happen in the second season... When it became clear it was going to happen, it was sad. I like the show a lot. I like the people. It's also sad to die when you have a part, and you've been through it a number of times. When you're acting, you sort of believe it to a certain degree." Regarding the difficulty filming it, he added: "Sometimes emotional scenes are very difficult, but this was very easy. And I miss them. I missed them even after scene ended, because the relationship dies when the character dies."

== Reception ==
=== Ratings ===
"Purged Away With Blood" was watched by 2.70 million viewers and received a 0.6 rating among viewers aged 18–49, the season's highest ratings to date.

=== Critical reception ===
The episode received favorable reviews. The A.V. Club's Alasdair Wilkins gave the episode a B− grade, calling it "an off-kilter, occasionally nonsensical hour of television. But, unlike so many of its predecessors, it's rarely boring, and it illuminates some of the show's grimmest, meanest themes. Tonight's episode has a perspective, even if it's utterly mad." Sean McKenna of TV Fanatic gave it 4 out of 5 stars, stating, "The episode may have been a mixed bag with first rate performances and story decisions that left me puzzled, but I'm hoping that for the final stretch of episodes, Hell on Wheels finds one track and rides it brilliantly to the end. The outcome should be an explosive one." McKenna lauded Noonan's performance, calling it "an outstanding performance as the Reverend. Noonan has always done a solid job portraying the man through his drunk tirades, his crazy beheadings and general outlandish actions, despite the character teetering around in the background."
