= Hell on Wheels season 2 =

Hell on Wheels
- Season 2
- Region 1 DVD artwork
- Showrunners: Joe Gayton; Tony Gayton
- No. of episodes: 10

Release
- Original network: AMC
- Original release: August 12 – October 7, 2012

Season chronology
- ← Previous; Season 1 Next → Season 3

The second season of the AMC western-drama television series Hell on Wheels premiered on August 12, 2012, and concluded on October 7, 2012. The series was created and produced by Joe and Tony Gayton who wrote and co-wrote two episodes. They also serve as the show's showrunners. In addition to the Gaytons, Jeremy Gold, John Shiban, and David Von Ancken also serve as series executive producers.

The season follows Cullen Bohannon, who joined a group of Rebel bandits robbing trains and planning to start a new Confederate colony in Mexico. While attacking Thomas Durant's payroll train, Cullen is captured by authorities and sentenced to death, but Durant intervenes with a pardon on the condition that Cullen returns to Hell on Wheels to help oversee railroad construction.

The second season was met with favorable reviews from critics with the premiered watched by just over 2.5 million viewers. The numbers were down significantly from the first season's premiere and finale.

== Cast ==
=== Main cast ===
The second season features ten series regulars. Robin McLeavy and Christopher Heyerdahl are promoted from recurring status.

- Anson Mount as Cullen Bohannon, a former worker for the Union Pacific Railroad, he's part of a band of robbers. (10 episodes)
- Colm Meaney as Thomas "Doc" Durant, a businessman and investor in the First Transcontinental Railroad, where he hopes to make his fortune. (9 episodes)
- Common as Elam Ferguson, a recently freed slave, he's the chief of railroad police. (10 episodes)
- Dominique McElligott as Lily Bell, having adopted her husband's dream, Lily commits to seeing the railroad through to completion, but has to deal with the moral sacrifices that such an endeavor demands. (10 episodes)
- Christopher Heyerdahl as Thor Gundersen, also known as "the Swede", an undertaker and custodian, having been tarred and feathered by the citizens of Hell on Wheels when he was in charge of security. (10 episodes)
- Tom Noonan as Reverend Nathaniel Cole, former minister of Hell on Wheels, starts to drink again. (7 episodes)
- Eddie Spears as Joseph Black Moon, a Cheyenne who's in love with Ruth but struggles between the traditions of his ancestors and the white men culture. (6 episodes)
- Ben Esler as Sean McGinnes, an ambitious young Irishman looking to make his fortune in the West. (8 episodes)
- Phil Burke as Mickey McGinnes, Sean's brother's, who travelled with Sean to America. (8 episodes)
- Robin McLeavy as Eva, a former indian whore, she supports herself by working in the Hell on Wheels brothel. (9 episodes)

=== Recurring cast ===
- Duncan Ollerenshaw as Mr. Gregory Toole (9 episodes)
- Kasha Kropinski as Ruth (8 episodes)
- Dohn Norwood as Psalms (7 episodes)
- James Dugan as Carl (5 episodes)
- Brian Jensen as Teamaster (5 episodes)
- Grainger Hines as Doc Whitehead (4 episodes)
- Sydney Bell as Ginny (4 episodes)
- Virginia Madsen as Hannah Durant (4 episodes)
- April Telek as Nell (3 episodes)
- Ryan Robbins as Hawkins (2 episodes)
- Kal Weber as Senator Howard (2 episodes)
- Alex Zahara as Lt. Weston (2 episodes)
- Kal Weber as Congressman Oakes Ames (2 episodes)
- Timothy V. Murphy as Bauer (1 episode)

== Production ==
=== Filming ===
Production began in late-April 2012. While last season's exterior filming took place on the Tsuu T'ina Nation indian reserve, this season's exterior were filmed near the Bow River in Calgary, allowing for bigger sets, approximately 3,002 feet (915 meters) of railroad track, and an extra locomotive and nearly a dozen loosely made, wooden structures to be built. Interior filming was done in a 56,000-square-foot (over 5202 square meters) makeshift studio near the city's airport. Series producers said filming the season's ten episodes took about 80 days.

Anson Mount (Cullen Bohannon) spoke about the differences between the seasons: "The big question of this season is why is Cullen Bohannon sticking with the railroad. Why is he here? And hopefully that will be absolutely answered by the end of the season. I think for me, it's also been about opening up different facets of the character. I want to find the parts of Cullen that are light, that are aware of humor, and that's been a particularly exciting thing for me to do this year."

Dominique McElligott (Lily Bell) also spoke of the character changes: "When I arrived in Calgary and I read the script, my jaw dropped. I couldn't believe where Lily was. Her motivations have changed, and her ambition from her husband has become her own ambition... Lily's character has surprised me in terms of how cunning she's become and calculating and how determined and ambitious that she is."

Common (Elam Ferguson) spoke about the audience's perception of the American frontier through Elam: "We haven't seen a character like this from that time period, and I think that was important. One thing that I've really appreciated about Elam is that he's a leader and very intelligent. He cares for people, he's passionate, and has his own dream, and thinks for himself. You know, he's a human being. And I think that's one of the most important things that people can learn from Hell on Wheels and that time period is that people were people. Some of the same things that we go through now, they experienced."

=== Casting ===
Virginia Madsen was cast in a four-episode story arc as Hannah Durant, wife of Thomas.

== Episodes ==
No. overall	No. in season	Title	Directed by	Written by	Original release date	Prod. code	US viewers (millions)
11	1	"Viva la Mexico"	David Von Ancken	Tony Gayton & Joe Gayton	August 12, 2012	201	2.45
Cullen Bohannon robs trains, one of which is guarded by Elam, with a group of ex-Confederate soldiers, while Lily Bell and Thomas Durant attempt to resume the Union Pacific Railroad's westward progress.
12	2	"Durant, Nebraska"	Adam Davidson	John Shiban	August 19, 2012	202	2.31
Durant takes some men to a ransacked town of his namesake, where he learns the Sioux Nation has declared war on him. Cullen is freed from the Union Army prison by an unlikely ally. Lily promises Eva justice in the prostitute's murder, which Elam investigates.
13	3	"Slaughterhouse"	Sergio Mimica-Gezzan	Jami O'Brien & Bruce Marshall Romans	August 26, 2012	203	2.50
Bauer, the town butcher and friend of the deceased Schmidt, seeks to avenge his murder. His target: a bragging Mickey McGinnes and his brother. With no help from Elam, Lily admits her involvement with Schmidt's murder to Durant, who asks Cullen to control the angry mob.
14	4	"Scabs"	Catherine Hardwicke	Chris Mundy	September 2, 2012	204	2.47
The Sioux torture a railroad worker, causing the crews to go on strike. Cullen telegraphs for replacement workers ("scabs"), forcing the crews to band together and save their jobs. Eva tells both Elam and Toole that she is pregnant with Elam's baby.
15	5	"The Railroad Job"	Michael Nankin	Mark Richard	September 9, 2012	205	2.62
Cullen's former train-robbing gang sets their sights on Hell on Wheels and its safe. Elam struggles to maintain order and has to rely on Cullen's help, causing the town to shun him. The Swede continues to prepare Reverend Cole for his prophetic "war".
16	6	"Purged Away with Blood"	Joe Gayton	Tony Gayton & Tom Brady	September 16, 2012	206	2.70
The Swede and Reverend Cole aid the Sioux in their war with the railroad — the Swede supplies their guns and Cole hijacks the train taking Durant, Eva, and Doc Whitehead to Chicago, intent on killing them all.
17	7	"The White Spirit"	David Von Ancken	Jami O'Brien & Bruce Marshall Romans	September 23, 2012	207	2.32
The Swede returns to town to help Lily with the railroad's accounting ledgers, against Cullen's wishes. Mickey McGinnes and his brother Sean seek to expand their franchise. Cullen arrests Swede for supplying Sioux with rifles. Lily insists Cullen frees the Swede so she can continue Railroad business in Durant's absence and he agrees against his better judgement. Cullen finds himself frustrated and plans on leaving Hell On Wheels when Lily confronts him saying he runs away when things get tough. The next day Cullen admits to Lily she was right and she tells him she's glad he stayed. That night Lily goes to Cullen's train car and they make love.
18	8	"The Lord's Day"	Rod Lurie	Mark Richard & Chris Mundy	September 30, 2012	208	1.83
Durant returns to town with his wife Hannah. Lily is concerned about her future with the railroad. The Swede sabotages a steam powered winch used to build the bridge.
19	9	"Blood Moon"	Terry McDonough	Mark Richard & Jami O'Brien	October 7, 2012	209	2.18
An army officer interrogates Cullen about the apparent destruction of Hell on Wheels and an accounting ledger that was mailed. Hannah Durant suggests to Lily that she move to New York City and be a governess, while husband Thomas has allowed Elam to keep his house if he performs a special task for him. Ruth tells Sean they cannot be together due to each one's religion. Toole finds Eva at Elam's place and kills himself in front of her, despite her informing him she had ended her relationship with Elam.
20	10	"Blood Moon Rising"	John Shiban	John Shiban	October 7, 2012	210	2.18
Elam decides not to kill Lily after she offers him a security chief position when she and Cullen take over the railroad after Durant's embezzlement is made known. Hannah tends to a badly burned Swede, who explains that the Sioux turned on him and they will attack the town the next day. Sean converts his religion and is baptized, only to be shunned by Ruth. Swede escapes sickbed. The next night, Sioux attack and destroy the town. In the aftermath, the Swede strangles Lily. Cullen finds Lily and carries her to the church, then takes the Swede to the bridge to kill him by hanging. Before Cullen can secure the rope, the Swede jumps to the river below. The army officer asks if Cullen will finish the railroad. Cullen does not respond and then is seen walking around the partially destroyed town. He is last seen picking up a striped red and white flag off the ground and tossing it into a rail cart.

== Reception ==
=== Critical reception ===
The second season received a 60 out of 100 aggregate score, based on nine reviews, indicating "mixed or average" reception at Metacritic. Ken Tucker of Entertainment Weekly gave the season start a B+, calling it "visually impressive," adding "the show rises or falls each week on the strength of the moments when [Anson] Mount and Common dominate. Each actor in his own way is capable of lifting Hell on Wheels to the level the series so clearly wants to attain: a fresh take on the old macho code of a-man's-gotta-do-what-a-man's-gotta-do, without posturing or a self-consciousness about the century of Westerns that have preceded it." Salon's Willa Paskin called the new season "a perfectly adequate piece of television with above adequate production values", adding "even if Westerns aren't particularly your thing, Hell on Wheels doesn't hurt to watch, if, you know, it's not actually fun to watch." Verne Gay of Newsday gave it a B− and stated "the cast [...] is good, while the Old West still feels especially beautiful and perilous." New York Magazine's Matt Zoller Seitz stated the show "still looks and sounds great, has a mostly capable cast, and delivers flat-out terrific Elam scenes, large-scale action set pieces, and lantern-lit images that reminded of The Assassination of Jesse James by the Coward Robert Ford. But the rest is wasted motion." Maureen Ryan of The Huffington Post found the second season "marginally better paced and the characters moderated a bit from the broad archetypes seen in Season 1," but added "It's a mystery to me how something about the building of railroad can so often fail to take advantage of the literal engine at its core." The AV Club gave Season 2 a grade of B− overall, but suggested that it might be the last.

=== Ratings ===
The second-season premiere was watched by just over 2.5 million viewers and 793,000 adults aged 18–49, a 0.6 Nielsen rating. The numbers were down significantly from the first season's premiere and finale. The first-season premiere had a lead-in program in The Walking Dead. The two-hour finale was watched by 2.18 million viewers and received a 0.6 18-49 rating.
