= Scabs (Hell on Wheels) =

- Hell on Wheels episode
- Episode no.: Season 2 Episode 4
- Directed by: Chris Mundy
- Written by: Catherine Hardwicke
- Production code: 204
- Original air date: September 2, 2012

Guest appearances
- Evan Hall as Fleming; James Dugan as Carl; Duncan Ollerenshaw as Toole; Dohn Norwood as Psalms

Episode chronology
← Previous "Slaughterhouse"	Next → "The Railroad Job"
- Hell on Wheels (season 2)

"Scabs" is the fourth episode of the second season of the American television drama series Hell on Wheels, which aired on September 2, 2012 on AMC. The fourteenth episode of the series is written by Catherine Hardwicke and directed by Chris Mundy. In the episode, the Sioux torture a railroad worker, causing the crews to strike. Cullen (Anson Mount) telegraphs for replacement workers ("scabs"), forcing the crews to band together and save their jobs. Eva (Robin McLeavy) tells both Elam (Common) and Toole (Duncan Ollerenshaw) that she is pregnant with Elam's baby.

== Plot ==
The railroad construction gets further into dangerous territory as screams are heard near a cutting site. The Sioux are torturing Fleming (Evan Hall), the railroad's sentry. Staying just outside their gun range, Cullen aims a rifle and shoots Fleming dead. The Sioux disperse. Back at camp, Reverend Cole (Tom Noonan) begs bartender Carl (James Dugan) for a drink. Cullen buys Cole a round and asks him to read a eulogy for Fleming, but Cole explains Ruth (Kasha Kropinski) is now over the church and he sleeps in the cemetery. Cullen offers to let Cole stay in his caboose.

Outside, the railroad crew returns early. Cullen orders them back to work but Toole refuses out of concern for their safety. Cullen threatens to make it unsafe for them at the camp if they do not get back to work, but Toole stands his ground. In the railway office, Lily (Dominique McElligott) recommends to Durant (Colm Meaney) that they reroute the railroad to bypass Sioux sacred land. Cullen takes the opposite opinion, claiming the Sioux will always be a threat and that it's better to fight them now rather than later.

Eva tells Elam that she is pregnant with his baby, and although he is initially upset, he later professes his love to her. Elam tries to give Eva money so that she can get an abortion, fearing that Toole would kill her and the baby if he found out, but she does not accept the money. At the saloon, the crewmen hold a wake for Fleming, where they honor him with song and drink. Cullen enters to pay his respects and to urge the men back to work. Psalms (Dohn Norwood) and the Freedmen arrive and offer to protect the railroad from the Sioux if they are armed with rifles. The room erupts in objections and Cullen says Durant would never arm ex-slaves. Psalms and Toole declare a strike until their demands are met.

The next day, the town burns an effigy of Durant in the street. Durant orders Cullen to resolve the situation, giving him complete authority. Watching the bonfire, Elam warns Psalms that the Freedmen will get themselves killed "playing" with guns. Psalms counters that they will never be seen as equals unless they are holding weapons. Toole comes home and drunkenly gropes Eva. She gently pushes him away, announcing that she is pregnant and that it is not his. He grabs his bag and leaves. Cullen telegraphs a message to Council Bluffs, Iowa requesting 200 replacement workers. Elam predicts bloodshed, and tells Cullen that he will not clean up after Cullen's mess. Cullen says Elam will do whatever Durant tells him to.

Outside his tent with Reverend Cole, the Swede (Christopher Heyerdahl) prophesies a war. He yanks Cole's liquor bottle away from him, telling him that he needs to see things clearly and they must decide which side they are on. In the street that night, Elam threatens to kill Toole if he hurts Eva. Toole, having by now figured out that Elam is the father of Eva's baby, counters that Elam is a neither a "real man" nor a "real father", and that he is just a coward. The train with the replacement workers arrives. Toole and his men exit the bar as the train stops. Cullen and Elam watch as the railroad crews attack their replacements. Toole and Psalms unite in the fight and together drive the new crewmen back onto the train as it departs. Toole finds Cullen at the saloon and agrees to send his men back to work if the Freedmen protect them — with guns. Cullen joins Elam at his table and tells him to get the Freedmen back to work. When Elam protests, Cullen compares the men to horses, saying there is no sense in having a horse unless it is "broke enough to ride." Elam objects to the comparison, but Cullen simply reminds him that he works for Durant now.

The next day, Elam tells the Freedmen to either get back to work or go back to prison. Psalms challenges him and they fight. Elam repeatedly punches Psalms in the kidneys, hurting him badly, but Psalms eventually knocks Elam out. At the railway office, Cullen tells Durant that the strike is over if he can arm the Freedmen. Durant concedes, although Lily still objects to passing through Sioux sacred land. Toole returns home, crawls into bed next to Eva and tenderly touches her belly, softly telling her that her husband has returned home. Cullen arrives at his caboose to find Cole packing up. Cole says that he cannot stay with him because Cullen believes the Sioux are their enemy. Cullen says that he respects his statement. He later distributes guns to the Freedmen and then instructs them on how to load and shoot rifles. As Durant and Lily watch the Freedmen guard the cut, Cullen tells Psalms to shoot anything that moves.

== Reception ==
=== Ratings ===
"Scabs" was watched by 2.47 million viewers and received a 0.6 rating among viewers aged 18–49.

=== Critical reception ===
The episode received positive reviews. The A.V. Club's Alasdair Wilkins gave the episode a B− grade, stating: "It took a season and a half, but Hell On Wheels has finally gone ahead and told a story that's actually, properly about building a railroad. Even more promisingly, the episode that does so places ... all the focus on the two protagonists, Cullen and Elam." Sean McKenna of TV Fanatic rated "Scabs" with 4 out of 5 stars, calling it "a fine episode", but added that "it wasn't nearly as exciting or memorable" as "Slaughterhouse".
