= Daniel Lapaine =

Australian actor (born 1971)

- Born: 15 June 1971 (age 55); Sydney, New South Wales, Australia
- Education: National Institute of Dramatic Art (1992)
- Occupation: Actor
- Years active: 1989–present
- Spouse: Fay Ripley (m. 2001)
- Children: 2

Daniel Lapaine (born 15 June 1971) is an Australian stage, film and television actor, living in London. He first came to prominence in 1994, playing South African swimmer David Van Arkle in Muriel's Wedding (1994). He also works as a writer and director.

Other acting credits include 54 (1998), The 10th Kingdom (2000), Helen of Troy (2003), Death on the Nile (2004), Jericho (2006), Moon Shot (2009), Zero Dark Thirty (2012), Black Mirror (2011 & 2017), Versailles (2015), Catastrophe (2015), The Durrells (2017), Upright (2019–2022), and Queen of Oz (2023).

== Early life ==
Born in Sydney, New South Wales, to an Italian father and an Australian mother, Lapaine graduated from the National Institute of Dramatic Art (NIDA) in 1992.

== Career ==
=== Television and film ===
His career started in 1994, when he played the South African swimmer David Van Arkle in P. J. Hogan's Muriel's Wedding. Since then he has worked internationally in film, theatre, and television and is now based in London.

Lapaine has made two appearances in the UK TV Show Black Mirror, six years apart. First in 2011, as the morally dubious Max in "The Entire History of You", and later as the masochistic Dr. Dawson in 2017's "Black Museum".

Lapaine's film work includes Kathryn Bigelow's Oscar-winning Zero Dark Thirty, Last Chance Harvey, opposite Dustin Hoffman and Emma Thompson, and Shanghai, opposite John Cusack. He played the lead role in Pathe's The Abduction Club, and Miramax's Elephant Juice, as well as memorable appearances in Brokedown Palace opposite Claire Danes and Kate Beckinsale. He has also appeared in many other films including 54, Dangerous Beauty, Polish Wedding and Gozo.

Lapaine has worked extensively in television, appearing in all four series of Catastrophe for Channel 4 and Amazon Prime, in which he plays the part of Dave. He portrayed King Charles II in the Canal + series Versailles (2015). He starred in the 2000 television miniseries The 10th Kingdom as Prince Wendell White, ruler of the 4th Kingdom, and played Tim Allerton in the 2004 Agatha Christie's Poirot episode Death on the Nile opposite David Suchet. In 2009, he portrayed Neil Armstrong in the television film Moon Shot (2009). He also played Hector in Helen of Troy opposite Rufus Sewell. Other television credits include Critical; Vexed; Lewis; Vera; Identity; Hotel Babylon; Sex, the City and Me; Jane Hall; The Good Housekeeping Guide; The Golden Hour; Jericho; and I Saw You. Lapaine also wrote and directed the Australian feature film 48 Shades. Based on the 1999 novel 48 Shades of Brown by Nick Earls, the film was released in Australia by Buena Vista in 2006.

From 2019, He starred as Toby Flynn, working alongside Tim Minchin and Milly Alcock in the Australian comedy series Upright. In 2023, he starred as Prince Frederick, the fictional heir to the British throne, in the BBC One series Queen of Oz, also starring Catherine Tate as his sister Princess Georgiana. In Australia, he appeared in A Country Practice and G.P., opposite Cate Blanchett.

=== Theatre ===
In theatre, he most recently he played Bassanio in The Merchant of Venice at Shakespeare's Globe, opposite Jonathan Pryce. Other theatre credits include the parts of Trip in Other Desert Cities and Eilert Lovborg in Ibsen's Hedda Gabler at the Old Vic, opposite Sheridan Smith. He played Leontes in The Winter's Tale at the Sheffield Crucible; Kurt in The Dance of Death at the Donmar Warehouse, and at Trafalgar Studios, Chelsea. He played George in All My Sons in the West End, opposite David Suchet. At the Royal Court, he appeared in Scenes from the Back of Beyond and F***ing Games, directed by Dominic Cooke. In Australia, Lapaine appeared at The Sydney Theatre Company in King Lear, and Les Parents Terribles, "Island" at Belvoir Street and for the Bell Shakespeare Company; he played Romeo in Romeo and Juliet, as well as appearing in Hamlet and Richard III.

== Personal life ==
In 1998, Lapaine met English actress Fay Ripley at a party hosted by mutual friends. After meeting again on a trip in New York, they began dating. They married in October 2001 in a ceremony in Tuscany, Italy. In October 2002, the couple had their first child, a daughter named Parker. Their second child, a son, named Sonny, was born in October 2006. They reside in London.

== Filmography ==
=== Film ===
Year	Title	Role	Notes
1994	Muriel's Wedding	David Van Arkle	
1998	Polish Wedding	Ziggy	
1998	Dangerous Beauty	Serafino Franco	
1998	54	Marc the Doorman	
1999	Brokedown Palace	Nick Parks	
1999	Double Jeopardy	Handsome Internet Expert	
1999	Elephant Juice	Will	
2002	The Abduction Club	Garrett Byrne	
2002	Ritual	Wesley Claybourne	
2008	Last Chance Harvey	Scott Wright	
2010	Shanghai	Ted	Uncredited
2012	Zero Dark Thirty	Tim - Station Chief	
2013	Jack the Giant Slayer	Jack's Dad	Uncredited
2013	Dead in Tombstone	Sheriff Bob Massey	
2020	Miss Fisher and the Crypt of Tears	Lord Lofthouse	
2021	She Will	Keith	

=== Television ===
Year	Title	Role	Notes
2000	The 10th Kingdom	Prince Wendell White	Miniseries
2003	Helen of Troy	Prince Hector	Miniseries
2004	Agatha Christie's Poirot	Tim Allerton	Episode: "Death on the Nile"
2006	The Good Housekeeping Guide	Joe	TV film
2006	Jane Hall	Richard	6 episodes
2007	Sex, the City and Me	Patrick Turner	TV film
2008	Hotel Babylon	Ned Wright	4 episodes
2009	Moonshot	Neil Armstrong	TV film
2009	Waking the Dead	Samuel Knight	Episode: "Magdalene 26"
2011	Black Mirror	Max	Episode: "The Entire History of You"
2012	Vera	Michael Morgan	Episode: "Silent Voices"
2012	Lewis	Kit Renton	Episode: "Generation of Vipers"
2012	Vexed	Bob	Episode #2.3
2014	Death in Paradise	Paul Bevans	Episode: "Ye of Little Faith"
2014	Inspector George Gently	Stefan Lesley	Episode: "Gently with Honour"
2015	Catastrophe	Dave	9 episodes
2015	Versailles	Charles II of England	Episode #1.9
2017	Black Mirror	Dr. Pete Dawson	Episode: "Black Museum"
2017	The Durrells	Hugh Jarvis	6 episodes
2019–2022	Upright	Toby Flynn	9 episodes
2020	Van der Valk	Paul Oosterhuis	Episode: "Love in Amsterdam"
2021	Five Bedrooms	Joe Chigwell	3 episodes
2022	A Spy Among Friends	Donald Maclean	3 episodes
2023	Queen of Oz	Freddie	2 episodes
2024	McDonald & Dodds	Brad Coleman	Episode: "The Rule of Three"
2024	Moonflower Murders (TV series)	Craig Andrews	1 episode

=== Video games ===
Year	Title	Role
2011	Dirt 3	Jack
2016	Forza Horizon 3	Warren
2024	Suicide Squad: Kill The Justice League	Captain Boomerang
