= Richard Wilson (Australian actor) =

English-born Australian actor (born 1984)

- Born: Richard John Wilson; 23 October 1984 (age 41); Leicester, England
- Education: University of Sydney & Western Sydney University
- Occupations: Actor; writer
- Years active: 2001–2009

Richard John Wilson (born 23 October 1984 in Leicester, England) is a British-born Australian actor.

== Early life and education ==
Richard Wilson moved from the UK to Sydney, Australia when he was six years old, and currently resides in Sydney. He and his younger brother, Andrew, were raised in the Blue Mountains by their parents. He attended the academically selective Penrith High School.

In 2008, Richard decided to take an extended hiatus from performance to complete a honours degree in Psychology at Western Sydney University.

== Career ==
At the age of fifteen, Wilson landed his first screen role as lead character Nick Jansen in short-lived 2001 sitcom Flat Chat. In 2004, he was nominated for an Australian Film Industry Award for Best Young Actor, for his portrayal of Miller McKee in teen drama series Out There.

Wilson made his feature film debut as Robert 'Poker' Bernardi, one of the lead characters in Nick Cave’s 2005 skateboarding drama film Deck Dogz. He then starred in 2005 Australian Western film The Proposition as Mike Burns, younger brother of Charlie (Guy Pearce) and Arthur (Danny Huston). He won a FilmInk Award for Best Australian Newcomer for his portrayal. The following year, he played the co-lead role of Dan in the 2006 Australian film 48 Shades, based on the book 48 Shades of Brown by Nick Earls.

Wilson delivered a critically acclaimed performance as Mark in the 2007 film Clubland, receiving an Australian Film Industry Award nomination for Best Supporting Actor. The Australian Broadcasting Corporation described his portrayal of a mentally handicapped teen as "a tour de force performance".

In 2009, Wilson had a supporting role in Australian horror film The Loved Ones, alongside Xavier Samuel. That same year, he appeared in drama film Birthday.

== Awards ==
Year	Work	Award	Category	Result	Ref.
2004	Out There	Australian Film Institute Awards	Best Young Actor	Nominated	
2006	Debut	St Kilda Short Film Festival	Best Actor	Won	
2006	The Proposition & Deck Dogz	FilmInk Magazine Awards	Best Australian Newcomer	Won	
2007	Clubland	Australian Film Institute Awards	Best Supporting Actor	Nominated	
2008	Clubland	Film Critics Circle of Australia	Best Actor in a Supporting Role	Nominated	

== Filmography ==
=== Film ===
Year	Title	Role	Notes	Ref.
2005	Deck Dogz	Robert 'Poker' Benardi		
2005	The Proposition	Mike Burns		
2006	Debut	Jerry	Short film	
2006	48 Shades	Dan Bancroft		
2007	Clubland (aka Introducing the Dwights)	Mark		
2008	Summer Breaks	Mat	Short film	
2009	Liebermans in the Sky	Glenn Goodman	Short film	
2009	The Loved Ones	Jamie		
2009	Sunset Over Water	Bob	Short film	
2011	Birthday	Joey		

=== Television ===
Year	Title	Role	Notes	Ref.
2001	Flat Chat	Nick Jansen	13 episodes	
2001	Escape of the Artful Dodger	Lord Edward Tuxley	Miniseries	
2001; 2002	McLeod's Daughters	Sean Howard	Seasons 1–2, 5 episodes	
2002; 2009	All Saints	Adam Finch / Aaron		
2003; 2004	Out There	Miller McKee	24 episodes	
