= Slaughterhouse (Hell on Wheels) =

- Hell on Wheels episode
- Episode no.: Season 2 Episode 3
- Directed by: Sergio Mimica-Gezzan
- Written by: Jami O'Brien; Bruce Marshall Romans
- Production code: 203
- Original air date: August 26, 2012

Guest appearances
- Timothy V. Murphy as Bauer; Sydney Bell as Ginny

Episode chronology
← Previous "Durant, Nebraska"	Next → "Scabs"
- Hell on Wheels (season 2)

"Slaughterhouse" is the third episode of the second season of the American television drama series Hell on Wheels, which aired on August 26, 2012 on AMC. The thirteenth episode of the series is co-written by Jami O'Brien & Bruce Marshall Romans, and directed by Sergio Mimica-Gezzan. Bauer, the town butcher and friend of the deceased Schmidt, seeks to avenge his murder. His target: a bragging Mickey McGinnes (Phil Burke) and his brother Sean (Ben Esler). With no help from Elam (Common), Lily (Dominique McElligott) admits her involvement with Schmidt's murder to Durant (Colm Meaney), who asks Cullen (Anson Mount) to control the angry mob.

== Plot ==
The Swede (Christopher Heyerdahl) goads Bauer (Timothy V. Murphy), the town butcher, about Schmidt's murder. Bauer is upset that his friend was killed over a prostitute. At the saloon, Durant asks a hungover Elam to monitor Cullen. He agrees, but later mutters to himself that he could have done Cullen's job. At the brothel, Mickey promises prostitute Ginny (Sydney Bell) that anyone who threatens her will end up like Schmidt. When she asks if he killed Schmidt, Mickey does not deny it. In his tent, Eva (Robin McLeavy) thanks Elam for killing Schmidt. They kiss, but she scolds him for wanting money more than a good woman and leaves.

Reverend Cole (Tom Noonan) complains to the Swede about daughter Ruth (Kasha Kropinski). He believes she has taken his place in the church and corrupted Joseph (Eddie Spears). The Swede encourages Cole with the biblical story of Jesus casting out the temple's moneychangers, adding, "We must cast them out." Ruth delivers Schmidt's eulogy at church but is interrupted when Cole accuses her of sleeping with Joseph, calling her a fornicator. Enraged by the interruption, Bauer lunges at Cole, but the Swede redirects his anger toward "the Irish brothers" who killed Schmidt. Bauer and his friends, along with The Swede, hunt down Sean and Mickey and direct them to the slaughterhouse.

Elam rushes in to alert Durant about the McGinnes brothers' abduction. Durant orders Elam to assist Cullen in controlling the situation. The mob hangs Sean and Mickey by their bound hands from slaughterhouse's meat hooks as the butcher sharpens his knife. Elam and Cullen storm in and free the brothers, but Cullen then leads them to the jail car. Mickey protests that he did not kill Schmidt, but acknowledges that he let everyone think so. Cullen still ushers them into the car. The butcher arrives to warn that either Cullen kills them or he will.

In the jail car, Mickey admits to Sean that he liked people thinking he was Schmidt's killer, and wanted Sean to think that he could do something on his own. Sean predicts that, even if they somehow "slip the noose", the "Kraut" will butcher them. Cullen tells Durant he believes the McGinnes brothers are innocent. Durant agrees to spare Sean but insists Mickey dies, since he confessed. Lily suggests they investigate further. She later asks Elam to confess, but he refuses, believing that if the McGinneses hang, he and Lily will be free. She decides to speak to Durant without mentioning Elam's involvement, confessing that she paid a man to kill Schmidt in the name of justice. Durant angrily asks if Lily would like to take Mickey's place on the gallows "in the interests of justice."

Cullen interrupts the Swede's bath by pointing the Swede's own gun at his head. He suggests the Swede is taking revenge on the McGinneses for tarring-and-feathering him. He believes the Swede hates everybody, especially himself. The Swede retorts that he and Cullen are alike, but he hates Cullen more than Cullen hates himself. Lowering the gun, Cullen tells him that if he ever tries anything he will kill him. The Swede resigns himself and tells Cullen that he would miss him.

Reverend Cole urges Joseph to leave town and return to his tribe, but Joseph says he no longer belongs there either. He tells Cole he loves Ruth and will not abandon her, unlike her own father.

Durant relents and gives into a silent Lily, who informs Cullen that Durant has authorized the brothers' release. Cullen says the butcher may inflict a worse fate on Sean and Mickey once they are free and he will not protect them. Cullen confronts Elam about killing Schmidt with a warning: "Next time a noose goes round your neck, might not slip off so easy." Cullen tells Bauer that Durant has pardoned the McGinnes brothers, then orders him to leave town immediately. When he resists, Cullen punches him. As Bauer packs his knives, the released brothers attack and kill him, feeding his body parts to the pigs.

== Reception ==
=== Ratings ===
"Slaughterhouse" was watched by 2.50 million viewers and received a 0.6 rating among viewers aged 18–49, the season's highest ratings to date.

=== Critical reception ===
The episode received positive reviews. The A.V. Club's Alasdair Wilkins gave "Slaughterhouse" a B− grade, calling it "weirdly admirable", but adding the episode "has a theme it wants to explore—people are bloodthirsty animals, per the Swede’s opening narration— the creative team still doesn't quite have the skill to bring it all together. This episode is full of stuff happening, and it's possible for the audience to see how each sequence links back to the episode's big idea, but that still means the underlying connective tissue is missing." Sean McKenna of TV Fanatic rated the episode with 4.7 out of 5 stars, saying "Slaughterhouse" "proved that the season is getting better with each week." He added "the lawlessness of the land continues to prove intriguing, as the lines of friendship and alliances are as quickly crossed out as they are made."
