= Viva la Mexico =

- Hell on Wheels episode
- Episode no.: Season 2 Episode 1
- Directed by: David Von Ancken
- Written by: Tony Gayton; Joe Gayton
- Production code: 201
- Original air date: August 12, 2012

Guest appearances
- Ryan Robbins as Hawkins; Grainger Hines as Doc Whitehead; April Telek as Nell; Brian Jensen as Schmidt

Episode chronology
← Previous "God of Chaos"	Next → "Durant, Nebraska"
- Hell on Wheels (season 2)

"Viva la Mexico" is the season premiere of the second season of the American television drama series Hell on Wheels, which aired on August 12, 2012 on AMC. The eleventh episode of the series is written by Tony Gayton and Joe Gayton, and directed by David Von Ancken. In the episode, on the run for his crimes, Cullen Bohannon (Anson Mount) robs trains with a group of ex-Confederate soldiers, while Lily Bell (Dominique McElligott) and Thomas Durant (Colm Meaney) continue the Union Pacific Railroad's westward progress.

== Plot ==
A band of masked robbers hijacks Thomas Durant's payroll train, though a guard shoots one of them in the shoulder. The wounded bandit takes off his mask as he flees to reveal it is Cullen Bohannon. Later, Hawkins (Ryan Robbins), leader of the robbers, gives him his cut of the stolen money. Cullen insists they save their money to start a Confederate colony in Mexico, but Hawkins thinks the men should celebrate their victory and rob more trains. Doc Whitehead (Grainger Hines), an old friend of Cullen's, extracts a bullet fragment from Cullen's shoulder and apologizes for involving him in the gang. The train robbers later drink at a trading post, where a pair of former Union soldiers provoke Cullen into a fight after their comments about Southerners.

At the railway office, Lily tells Durant that railroad construction has been slow and complains about the foreman. Elam (Common) informs Durant that the payroll train was robbed again. Outside, Durant speaks with the Swede (Christopher Heyerdahl), who is tending his wagon. The Swede offers to help restore order in the town, but Durant thinks he should continue his new jobs as undertaker and custodian, having been tarred and feathered by the citizens of Hell on Wheels when he was in charge of security.

Nell (April Telek) finds one of the prostitutes murdered in bed, and a crowd watches silently as the Swede loads the body onto his wagon. Durant tells Lily about the murdered woman, a first for Hell on Wheels, and Lily insists they find and punish the killer, but Durant doesn't care, as she was a whore. Lily later gives the Swede money to ensure the dead woman receives a proper burial.

Spying on another train, Cullen recognizes Elam as the guard, then demands to be the first man on the train. As the bandits rob passengers on the train, Cullen barges into the payroll car and orders Elam to hand over the money, explaining that he is saving Elam's life. He refuses, and Cullen urges the robbers off the train, saying Elam overpowered him. Cullen urges the bandits to head straight to Mexico, but Hawkins wants to rob one more train and questions Cullen's motives. Cullen relents and agrees with Hawkins.

Durant chastises Elam for letting Cullen live, but Elam points out he was hired to only protect the payroll. He then offers to help get Hell on Wheels back on track, but Durant hesitates, on account of Elam's race, but says he will consider it. Sean and Mickey are now selling real estate in Hell on Wheels. Ruth approaches Sean with news that her father has been unable to preach for a few weeks and asks for more time on the rent. Sean proposes having dinner to discuss her affairs, but Ruth turns him down. At the brothel, Nell strikes a protection deal with Sean McGinnes (Ben Esler) for 10% of her profits. He later tells Mickey (Phil Burke) she agreed on the condition that they kill the whore's murderer. Standing at the edge of a river, Lily tells Durant that the Sioux tribe considers the land on the other side sacred and her husband Robert wanted to avoid it. Durant disregards her, says the Sioux will be the least of their troubles if they do not get the railroad under control.

Doc urges Cullen to forgo the heist and leave, saying the others are unhappy with him. Later, as the men rob the train, Cullen points his gun at one who is terrorizing a mother and child. The bandit knocks out a distracted Cullen, who wakes to find himself in a prison wagon, where he jokes with a ruffian (Mark Anderako), a fellow prisoner. Later, from his jail cell, Cullen watches a firing squad kill the ruffian, knowing he could be next.

== Reception ==
=== Ratings ===
"Viva La Mexico" was watched by 2.45 million viewers and received a 0.6 rating among viewers aged 18–49.

=== Critical reception ===
The episode received fairly positive reviews. The A.V. Club's Alasdair Wilkins gave the episode a B− grade, which was "somewhat provisional, my way of splitting the difference between all the problems of last season and the potential I still think the show has. This episode could look a lot better or a lot worse in retrospect, depending on how things proceed from here." Alan Sepinwall of HitFix also gave the episode a B− grade, calling it "a solid, meat-and-potatoes example of a genre (Westerns)". However, he added that while the cinematography was "beautiful to look at", most of the characters were "still thin and unengaging, even in their new stations." Their stories, he stated, "seem to be moving in circles, even as the railroad itself keeps moving forward." TV Fanatic's Sean McKenna rated the episode with 4 out of 5 stars, saying, "Maybe it wasn't a jaw dropping premiere or switched things up in a wild way, but it was engaging nonetheless and started with plenty of promise, potential and pure Western fun."
