= White spirit (disambiguation) =

White spirit is a petroleum-derived liquid.

White spirit may also refer to:

- White Spirit (band), a heavy metal band from England
- "The White Spirit", a 2012 Hell on Wheels episode
- Baijiu, a Chinese liquor sometimes called white spirit
