= The White Spirit =

- Hell on Wheels episode
- Episode no.: Season 2 Episode 7
- Directed by: David Von Ancken
- Written by: Bruce Marshall Romans
- Production code: 207
- Original air date: September 23, 2012

Guest appearances
- Duncan Ollerenshaw as Toole; Kasha Kropinski as Ruth; James Dugan as Carl; Dohn Norwood as Psalms; Chris Ippolito as Train Engineer

Episode chronology
← Previous "Purged Away with Blood"	Next → "The Lord's Day"
- Hell on Wheels (season 2)

"The White Spirit" is the seventh episode of the second season of the American television drama series Hell on Wheels, which aired on September 23, 2012 on AMC. The seventeenth episode of the series is written by Bruce Marshall Romans and directed by David Von Ancken. In the episode, the Swede (Christopher Heyerdahl) returns to town to help Lily (Dominique McElligott) with the railroad's accounting ledgers, against Cullen's (Anson Mount) wishes. Mickey McGinnes (Phil Burke) and his brother Sean (Ben Esler) seek to expand their franchise.

== Plot ==
Beside a river, the Swede shaves his head, paints his body white and then joins the Sioux as the "White Spirit" in a chant. In town, Toole (Duncan Ollerenshaw) is concerned that Durant's (Colm Meaney) possible death would affect their job security but Cullen orders them back to work. He joins Ruth (Kasha Kropinski) in mourning over Reverend Cole's (Tom Noonan) coffin in the church. He confesses to putting the knife in Joseph's (Eddie Spears) hands, but she says her father chose his own death and admits to thinking some souls are beyond redemption.

Mickey chides Sean for giving away a plot of land to the church, saying Sean's mind is clouded by his interest in Ruth. Sean insists it is charity, but Mickey is upset he was not even consulted. Elam (Common) approaches and asks about the brothers’ bid for the Starlight Saloon, but they tell him the owner, Carl (James Dugan), is not keen on selling. Elam says that he has a plan to remedy that, if they will give him a percentage of the profits and free riverfront property. Mickey agrees before Sean can object.

At the bridge construction site, Cullen orders Psalms (Dohn Norwood) to stop telling stories and work. Toole defends Psalms but is rebuked by Cullen. At the railway office, Cullen warns Lily against employing the Swede, but she reasons that he was Durant's bookkeeper for years and is essential in deciphering Durant's accounting ledgers. When the Swede comments on Cullen's new rifle, Cullen insinuates that the Sioux got it from the Swede. He turns to leave, but then hits the Swede on the head with the butt of the rifle.

In the jail car, Cullen hopes to obtain a confession from the Swede. He knows it was he who armed the Sioux, to which the Swede calls it "wonderful" and adds: "Bloodthirsty heathens with modern weapons, led by a drunken white man of God." He claims he and Cullen are bonded by their love of killing. Ruth sees the church being dismantled. Alarmed, she reminds Sean that he granted a rent extension. He surprises her with the deed to a new plot in the center of town, free of charge. Lily tells Cullen they must release the Swede if he has not confessed. Cullen tosses her the key. She must do it.

That night, Elam and Psalms hijack a train car of whiskey and break open the barrels. The Swede joins Cullen at the saloon and explains that he hates Cullen because he associates him with the horrors of Andersonville Prison. The Swede says the reason Cullen hates him in return is because the Swede is a constant reminder of the capacity for evil that resides within him. Cullen tells the Swede it is not a problem anymore because he is leaving town. Lily finds Cullen saddling his horse and accuses him of running away whenever things get difficult. "You can disagree with my decisions if you like," she says, "but judging my choices won't change yours. I'm done trying."

The next morning, after Carl finds his liquor shipment destroyed, Lily accuses Elam and Psalms of destroying it, based on the train engineer's (Chris Ippolito) description of two black men. Elam challenges her to identify which two black men the engineer saw, noting, that he is good enough for her dirty work, but not good enough to trust with security. She offers to renegotiate his position when Durant returns. He scoffs that he is finished negotiating and quits.

Cullen approaches Lily, who asks why he is still in town. He concedes she was right about him being ready to run away. She whispers that she is glad he stayed. Later at the railway office, The Swede informs her that, according to the books, Durant has been fraudulently inflating mileage numbers. Cullen finds Elam clearing grass for a riverfront home and says he will need Elam's help if the Sioux attack. Elam says that there is no place for him on the railroad. Cullen warns him that the Sioux will attack everyone, railroad workers or not.

At the saloon, the McGinnes brothers threaten Carl with continued destruction of his whiskey shipments as well as bodily harm if he does not sell the bar to them. He counter-threatens to send Hahn and the Germans after them. "Tell him to bring his friend the butcher, if he can find him," Mickey answers. Later that evening, Lily enters Cullen's caboose. They kiss, then make love. Carl signs the saloon over to Mickey and Sean. Later, Sean watches Ruth beaming as she preaches in front of her new church. By the river, Elam gazes at Eva’s wedding photo, covering Toole's face. The next morning, Cullen dresses quietly as Lily sleeps. As he walks out the door, Lily calls his name and he smiles.

== Reception ==
=== Ratings ===
"The White Spirit" was watched by 2.32 million viewers and received a 0.5 rating among viewers aged 18–49, the second-lowest numbers of the season.

=== Critical reception ===
The episode received high praise. The A.V. Club's Alasdair Wilkins gave the episode an A− grade, calling it "best episode the show has ever done", adding "it actually addresses many of the show's most basic flaws. It's too early to say the show has hit a turning point, but the fact that I'm seriously considering the possibility means plenty in and of itself." Sean McKenna of TV Fanatic gave it 4.6 out of 5 stars, calling it "another phenomenal addition to season two", adding "All of the characters had a chance to shine. It also called back to moments earlier in the season. And what was great about that is how they were expounded upon and that there was a real sense that for the characters, things were moving forward."
