= Philip Dean =

Australian playwright

Philip Robert Dean (born 1954) is an Australian playwright.

== Biography ==
Dean was born in rural Queensland and is a graduate of the Queensland College of Art and the University of Queensland. He lives in Brisbane.

== Plays ==
Dean's writing for the stage includes Long Gone Lonesome Cowgirls and adaptations of three Nick Earls' novels—48 Shades of Brown, Zigzag Street, and After January.

== Awards ==
Dean is the winner of a Matilda Award for Long Gone Lonesome Cowgirls. In 2002, he won an AWGIE Award.
