= Moonshot (2009 film) =

2009 British television film

- Written by: Tony Basgallop
- Directed by: Richard Dale
- Starring: James Marsters, Andrew Lincoln
- Country of origin: United Kingdom
- Original language: English

Production
- Producer: Tim Goodchield
- Running time: 79 minutes

Original release
- Network: History Channel
- Release: 2009

Moonshot is a 2009 television film depicting the story leading up to the landing of Apollo 11's Lunar Module Eagle on the surface of the Moon on 20 July 1969.

== Cast ==
- James Marsters as Buzz Aldrin
- Andrew Lincoln as Michael Collins
- Ursula Burton as Marilyn Lovell
- Daniel Lapaine as Neil Armstrong
- William Hope as Psychologist
- Anna Maxwell Martin as Janet Armstrong
- Colin Stinton as Bob Gilruth
- Michael J. Reynolds as Gene Aldrin
- Nigel Whitmey as Deke Slayton
- Richard Dillane as Tom Stafford
- Ian Porter as Bill Anders

== Production ==
The film utilizes actual footage taken during the time period known as the Space Race.

== Reception ==
Mike Hale of The New York Times opined that it was "better than average" for a television film and that it featured "sensible" dialogue and "adequate" performances while mostly avoiding "opportunities for cheap emotion". Jason Bailey of DVD Talk rated the film 3/5 stars, opining that it "ingeniously intermingl[es] drama and documentary to tell a truly fascinating story with skill, if not a tremendous amount of depth." Michele Hewitson of The New Zealand Herald called the film an "uneasy mix of fact and licence" and a "competent but hardly inspiring retelling of that amazing story."

== See also ==
- Apollo 11 in popular culture
