= Victoria Thaine =

Australian actress

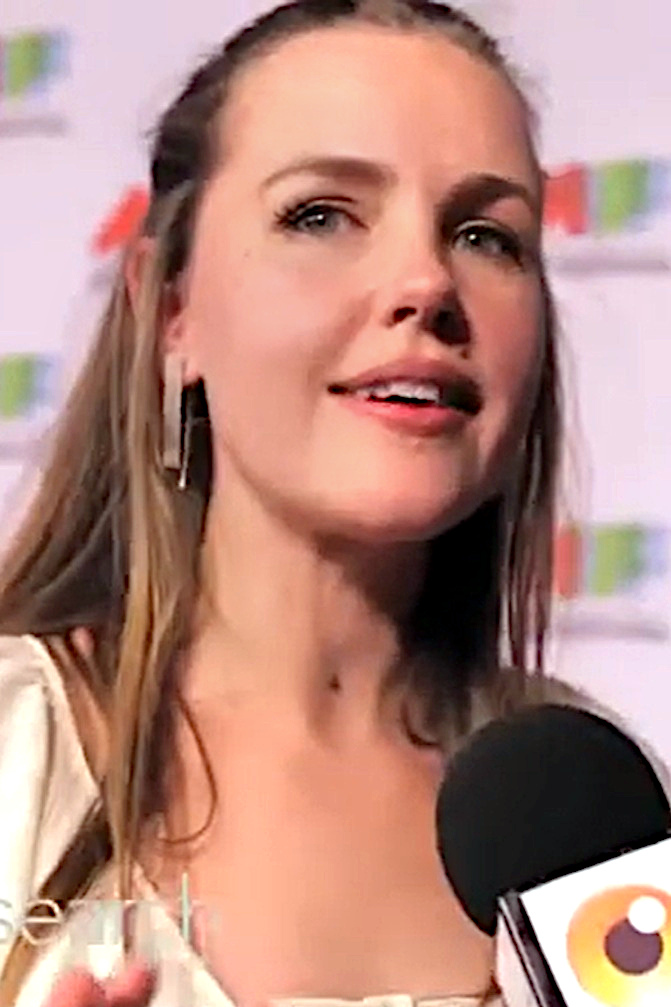
- Thaine at MIFF 2011
- Born: 4 January 1978 (age 48); Australia
- Occupation: Actress
- Years active: 2003–present

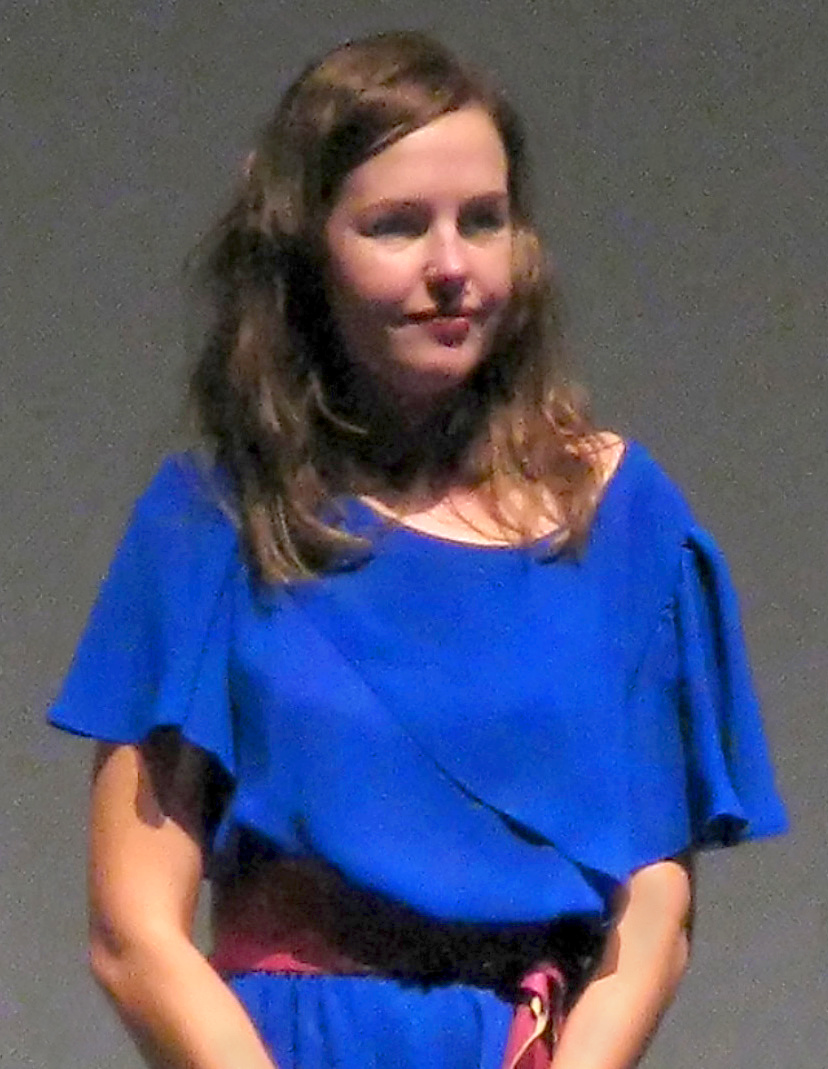
Thaine in September 2009

Victoria Thaine (born 4 January 1978) is an Australian television and film actress and former playwright.

Her screen credits include All Saints (2003), The Night We Called It a Day (2003), Small Claims: White Wedding (2005), Son of the Mask (2005), Blue Heelers (2006), Two Twisted (2006), The Caterpillar Wish (2006), 48 Shades (2006), Gone (2007), Rain Shadow (2007), BlackJack: Ghosts (2007), Wilfred (2010), Rake (2010), Rush (2011), Miss Fisher's Murder Mysteries (2012), The Doctor Blake Mysteries (2013), Mr & Mrs Murder (2013), Nowhere Boys (2013-2015), Nowhere Boys: The Book of Shadows (2016), and Scrublands (2023).

== Filmography ==
=== Film ===
Year	Title	Role	Notes
2003	The Night We Called It a Day	Penny	
2004	Floodhouse	Mara	
2005	Still Life	Mandy	Short
2005	Son of the Mask	Sylvia	
2005	The Assistant	Eunice	Short
2005	Debut	Jade	Short
2006	The Caterpillar Wish	Emily Woodbridge	
2006	48 Shades	Imogen	
2006	Gone	Lena	
2009	The Loved Ones	Holly	
2009	Special Korean Sauce	Tarina	Short
2010	Call Centre	Grace	Short
2010	The Last Tupper	Penny	Short
2011	The Republic of Simon	Victoria	Short
2014	Horse Feathers	Claire	Short
2016	Nowhere Boys: The Book of Shadows	Alice Hartley	

=== Television ===
Year	Title	Role	Notes
2003	All Saints	Sasha Netterfield	"Safety Net", "Doctor of Choice", "Harm's Way"
2005	Small Claims: White Wedding	Tori	TV film
2006	Blue Heelers	Gina O'Connor	"One Day More: Parts 1 & 2"
2006	Two Twisted	Danielle Carmody	"Saviour"
2007	Rain Shadow	Jill Blake	TV miniseries
2007	BlackJack: Ghosts	Jenny Searle	TV film
2010	Wilfred	Cynthia	"Honey You're Killing the Dog"
2010	Rake	Fiona McReady	"R vs Lorton", "R vs Tanner"
2011	Rush	Lexi Dennett	"4.2", "4.3"
2012	Miss Fisher's Murder Mysteries	Miss Parkes	"Blood and Circuses"
2013	The Doctor Blake Mysteries	Dawn Prentice	"Game of Champions"
2013	Mr & Mrs Murder	Tracey Anderson	"The Art of Murder"
2013-15	Nowhere Boys	Alice Hartley	Recurring role 13 episodes
2016	Bruce	Monica	"Neighbours", "Mortality's Light Lingering Touch", "Death Moth"
2019	Sonia and Cherry	Cherry	Main role
2023	Scrublands	Scrublands (TV series)	Season 1 - 4 episodes

== Other work ==
Year	Title	Notes
2010	The Last Tupper	Co-producer, writer, director
2013	The Kingdom of Doug	Writer, co-director

== Awards ==
- 2006 - Nominated for Film Critics Circle of Australia (FCCA) Award for 'Best Actress in a Lead Role'.
- 2008 - Nominated for Silver Logie Award for 'Most Outstanding Actress', for her role in the drama Rain Shadow.
- 2024 - Nominated for Equity Ensemble Awards for Outstanding Performance by an Ensemble in a Mini-series or Telemovie.
