= The Loved Ones (film) =

2009 Australian horror film by Sean Byrne

- Theatrical release poster
- Directed by: Sean Byrne
- Written by: Sean Byrne
- Produced by: Mark Lazarus; Michael Boughen
- Starring: Xavier Samuel; Robin McLeavy; Victoria Thaine; Jessica McNamee; Richard Wilson; John Brumpton
- Cinematography: Simon Chapman
- Edited by: Andy Canny
- Music by: Ollie Olsen
- Production companies: Screen Australia; Omnilab Media; Ambience Entertainment; Film Victoria; Melbourne International Film Festival Premiere Fund
- Distributed by: Madman Films (Australia); Paramount Pictures (International)
- Release dates: 13 September 2009 (TIFF); 4 November 2010 (Australia)
- Running time: 84 minutes
- Country: Australia
- Language: English
- Budget: $4 million
- Box office: $358,399

The Loved Ones is a 2009 Australian horror film written and directed by Sean Byrne in his feature directorial debut. It stars Xavier Samuel, Robin McLeavy, Victoria Thaine, Jessica McNamee, Richard Wilson, and John Brumpton. The film follows a teenage boy who finds himself at the mercy of a classmate's demented party after he declines her offer to attend the school dance.

== Plot ==
High schooler Brent is driving with his father Dan when a bloodied man appears in the middle of the road. Swerving to avoid the man, Brent crashes his vehicle into a tree, accidentally killing his father. Six months later, Brent politely turns down Lola Stone's invitation to the school formal in favor of his girlfriend Holly. Lola secretly watches the two having sex in Holly's car. Guilt-ridden over his father's death, Brent has turned to self-harm with a razor blade hidden in his necklace. At home, Brent's mother Carla insists on him taking a taxi rather than riding with an inexperienced Holly. Brent leaves his house and goes to a nearby cliff. He briefly contemplates suicide, but changes his mind. As he listens to music, someone knocks Brent out.

Brent wakes up bound to a chair. His captors are Lola and her father Eric, who have decorated their house in imitation of a formal. The three are sat at a table along with a lobotomized woman they call Bright Eyes. Lola injects Brent's voice box with bleach, destroying his vocal cords so he is unable to speak. She begins to humiliate him, experiencing arousal in the process. Brent frees himself and runs outside, but is re-captured. Once he is tied up again, they pin his feet to the floor with knives. Lola shows Brent a scrapbook with photos of her past victims. Brent recognizes Timmy Valentine, the bloodied man who caused his crash. Timmy turns out to be the brother of Mia Valentine, the prom date of Jamie, Brent's best friend. Lola then brands Brent by carving her initials onto his chest and throwing salt on it. After Eric crowns Lola prom queen, she admits having incestuous feelings for him. The two dance and almost kiss before Brent interrupts them.

Eric opens a trapdoor on the floor, revealing a basement cellar with the previous abductees still alive. Lola drills a hole through Brent's skull and prepares to lobotomize him by pouring boiling water into the hole. Brent manages to free himself again. He attacks Eric with his hidden razor blade and stabs him with one of the knives he pulled out of his feet. He pushes Eric into the cellar, where the starving and deranged (and presumably lobotomised) captives begin to eat his body. Lola pushes Brent into the cellar and throws everything she can get her hands on at him. Brent finds a flashlight and a hammer among the thrown objects and uses them to defend himself against the captives. Lola then smothers Bright Eyes — referring to her as her mother — with a pillow.

When Brent does not show up to the date, a worried Holly informs Mia's father, a police officer. He enters Lola's house, where Lola kills him with a meat cleaver. Lola taunts Brent, saying she will kill Carla as revenge for her father, and kill Holly as revenge for Brent breaking Lola's heart. After she leaves, Brent climbs out of the pit by piling up the corpses. As Lola walks on the road, she sees Holly approaching in her car. She throws her scrapbook at the windshield, and attacks Holly, who flees on foot. Brent arrives in the police car and runs over Lola. Holly clambers into the police car and is shocked to see Brent; the two embrace tearfully. A severely injured Lola approaches the car. Brent reverses the car, striking Lola in the head and crushing her skull. Brent and Holly arrive back home, where a shocked Carla embraces her son.

== Cast ==
- Xavier Samuel as Brent
- Robin McLeavy as Lola
- John Brumpton as Eric
- Richard Wilson as Jamie
- Victoria Thaine as Holly
- Jessica McNamee as Mia
- Andrew S. Gilbert as Paul
- Suzi Dougherty as Carla
- Victoria Eagger as Judith
- Anne Scott-Pendlebury as Bright Eyes
- Fred Whitlock as Dan

== Production ==
The Loved Ones is the first feature film for short filmmaker Sean Byrne. The Ambience Entertainment production was completely shot in Melbourne, Victoria, including interior school scenes shot at Box Hill Senior Secondary College and Kew High School. The film stars Xavier Samuel, Jessica McNamee, Robin McLeavy, and Richard Wilson.

It was originally given an R18+ rating by the Australian Classification Board, but through an appeal by the Review Board, the film's rating was successfully replaced by an MA15+ rating due to the comedy aspect of the film mitigating both the sadistic aspect and the impact of the violence.

The original soundtrack was composed by Australian experimental musician Ollie Olsen. Other bands and musicians whose songs are featured in the film include Cosmic Psychos, Sophie Koh, Kasey Chambers, Parkway Drive, British India, Witch Hats, Little Red, and Little River Band.

== Release ==
The film screened at several festivals, including the Toronto International Film Festival on 13 September 2009 and the Hong Kong International Film Festival on 3 April 2010. In America, it was screened at the AFI Fest on 31 October 2009, the San Francisco International Film Festival on 2 May 2010, the 2010 Dallas International Film Festival, and the 2010 SXSW Film Festival.

=== Home media ===
The film was initially assigned an NC-17 rating from the Motion Picture Association of America (MPAA); the content was toned down for the U.S. release, where it was Rated R. The first DVD copies were released in the United States in November 2009 over the American Film Market. The Loved Ones ran in a limited theatrical release in the US. On 1 June 2012, the film was shown in Austin, Chicago, Houston, Los Angeles, New York, and San Francisco. Paramount Pictures and Insurge Pictures distributed the film in its US theatrical release.

While Paramount did release their own DVD copy of the film in both unrated and an R-rated versions, a Blu-ray of it has yet to be released in the United States. The film debuted on Blu-ray in the United Kingdom on October 8, 2010, in a Region B–locked disc. The film debuted on Blu-ray in Japan on August 5, 2015, in a Region free disc, though it lacks any extras aside from two trailers and is now out of print.

== Reception ==
On review aggregation website Rotten Tomatoes, The Loved Ones earned a rating of 98% and an average score of 7.24/10 based on 58 reviews. The site's consensus for the film reads, "Successfully mixing the conventions of the teen and horror genres with a twist, Australian director Sean Byrne makes a striking directorial debut with The Loved Ones." This film ranks 49th place on the site's Top 100 Horror Movies list. The film has been lauded for its tongue-in-cheek approach and its main twist towards the end of the film. It won the Cadillac People's Choice Award - Midnight Madness in 2009.

=== Accolades ===
Award	Category	Subject	Result
AACTA Award (1st)	Best Original Screenplay	Sean Byrne	Nominated
Fangoria Chainsaw Award	Best Actress	Robin McLeavy	Nominated
Fangoria Chainsaw Award	Best Makeup/Creature FX	Justin Dix	Nominated
Fright Meter Award	Best Horror Movie	Michael Boughen	Nominated
Fright Meter Award	Best Horror Movie	Mark Lazarus	Nominated
Fright Meter Award	Best Director	Sean Byrne	Nominated
Fright Meter Award	Best Screenplay	Sean Byrne	Nominated
Fright Meter Award	Best Actress	Robin McLeavy	Nominated
Fright Meter Award	Best Supporting Actor	John Brumpton	Nominated
Fright Meter Award	Best Ensemble Cast		Nominated

=== Real-life crime ===
In March 2013, at Chester Crown Court, Judge Elgan Edwards described a sadistic torture murder as a re-enactment of a scene from this film. During sentencing, Judge Edwards described the defendant, Gary George, as particularly liking The Loved Ones. The victim, Andrew Nall, was brutally beaten, sustained 49 knife wounds, and had cleaning fluid found in his eyes. George was sentenced to life imprisonment with a minimum term of 30 years.
