= Zig Zag Street =

1996 novel by Nick Earls

ZigZag Street
- Cover
- Author: Nick Earls
- Language: English
- Publication date: 1996

ZigZag Street is a 1996 novel written by Australian writer Nick Earls. It was Earl's second novel and won the Betty Trask Award in 1998, which it shared with Kiran Desai's Hullaballoo in the Guava Orchard. It has been compared with the work of Nick Hornby.

In Review called it part of "Brisbane’s Holy Trinity of Gen X Lit:... more of a sad-boy novel, eagerly related to by whiney lawyers."

== Plot summary ==
Richard Derrington is a 28 year old corporate lawyer in Brisbane struggling to cope after his long term girlfriend, Anna Hiller, has left him. He lives on Zig Zag Street in the suburb of Red Hill, Brisbane, Queensland in his grandmother's former home. Taking place over six weeks, the novel has a slice-of-life, episodic structure, chronicling Derrington's failures and absurdities.

Ultimately, Derrington is pulled out of his depression by his relationship with Rachel Vilikovski, whom he meats by accidentally concussing when a high-heel slips from his hand and hits her head. After taking her to see a doctor, the pair agree to meet again and eventually begin a relationship.

A number of Brisbane landmarks feature prominently in the story, including Broadway On the Mall, Park Road railway station (now known as Boggo Road railway station) in Dutton Park as well as the eponymous Zig Zag Street (27.4551°S 153.0060°E).

Music is a major thematic device throughout the book. Derrington frequently references British band The Smiths and their album The Queen Is Dead, and first has sex with Vilikovski listening to Calenture by The Triffids. Its reference to Tim Tam biscuits and other Queensland icons has made it a cultural favourite.

== Adaptations ==
It was adapted for the stage by Philip Dean in 2004, playing at the La Boite Theatre before touring other cities.

In 2006, a film adaptation was reported to be planned, however this never eventuated.
