= Durant, Polk County, Nebraska =

Unincorporated community in Nebraska, U.S.

Coordinates: 41°05′32″N 97°39′50″W

Durant is an unincorporated community in Polk County, Nebraska, United States.

== History ==
Durant was established when the Union Pacific Railroad was extended to that point, during the construction of the First transcontinental railroad. The town was named for Thomas C. Durant, vice president of the railroad.

== In popular culture ==
A town called Durant, Nebraska features at the end of the first season and beginning of the second in the AMC TV series Hell on Wheels, in a nod to the real-life Durant. In the Season 2 episode titled "Durant, Nebraska", the town is ransacked by a Sioux war party and is not shown to be rebuilt.
