= The Devil's Candy =

2015 American horror film

- Theatrical release poster
- Directed by: Sean Byrne
- Written by: Sean Byrne
- Produced by: Jess Calder; Keith Calder
- Starring: Ethan Embry; Shiri Appleby; Kiara Glasco; Pruitt Taylor Vince
- Cinematography: Simon Chapman
- Edited by: Andy Canny
- Music by: Michael Yezerski
- Production companies: HanWay Films; Snoot Entertainment
- Distributed by: IFC Midnight
- Release dates: September 13, 2015 (TIFF); March 17, 2017 (United States)
- Running time: 80 minutes
- Country: United States
- Language: English

The Devil's Candy is a 2017 American horror film written and directed by Sean Byrne. The film stars Ethan Embry, Shiri Appleby, Kiara Glasco, Pruitt Taylor Vince, Craig Nigh and Marco Perella. The film was released by IFC Midnight on March 17, 2017.

== Plot ==
Late at night in a countryside house, Raymond Smilie hears an ominous voice. He reacts by playing his red Flying V loudly in front of a crucifix. His mother enters his room and unplugs the guitar. When Ray awkwardly explains he plays to avoid hearing "Him," she says he needs to return to the mental hospital. Ray continues to hear the voice and kills her. Shortly after, a man enters the house and sees the dead woman.

Some time later, the house is sold to Jesse Hellman, a struggling painter, his wife Astrid and their daughter Zooey. The real estate agent says that the woman who lived there died when she fell down the stairs, and her husband killed himself out of despair. Elsewhere, Ray checks into a motel. He listens to tapes preaching about the Devil, and plays his guitar. When a noise complaint brings a police officer to his room, Ray stops playing.

After settling into the house, Jesse starts hearing the same voices as Ray. Inspired, he paints a black and white painting based on an upside down cross motif. Jesse later approaches Belial, an art gallery whose owner Leonard previously turned away his portfolio. At his insistence, the receptionist looks at the scan of the painting and appears pleased. One evening, Ray shows up and has a brief conversation with Zooey, who tells him she would love to have a Flying V. Ray wants to enter the house, but an angry Jesse turns him away.

The next morning, Zooey and Jesse find Ray's Flying V outside their house, but Jesse refuses to let her keep it. Elsewhere, Ray kidnaps a boy. He carries the boy to a motel room, dismembers his body and puts the chopped up parts in a suitcase. Ray buries the boy in a hole already filled with several suitcases. Meanwhile, Jesse defaces a commissioned butterfly mural he had been working on, transforming it into a new painting with distorted faces of children - including the one Ray killed. Immersed in his work, he forgets to pick up Zooey at school, and to appease her, he lets her keep Ray's guitar. Jesse keeps working on the painting, which depicts the children's heads being devoured by a black creature and adds Zooey being burned alive. He tells a horrified Astrid that he feels the children inside him screaming to be let out.

At night, Ray sneaks into Zooey's bedroom. He covers her mouth and explains that "He" wants her, but Ray is trying to avoid hurting her. Zooey breaks his grip and screams, alerting Astrid and Jesse, but Ray flees. The Hellmans go to the police, who suggest they change the locks.

The next day, Leonard arrives to see Jesse's latest work. Pleased with the painting, Leonard offers to become his patron, with the privileges it brings. Jesse cuts the meeting short in order to rush to pick up Zooey at school, but he gets a flat tire and runs to the school to find Zooey missing. In Ray's motel bathroom, Zooey is tied up with duct tape. Ray tells Zooey that he can no longer resist "Him," and that "He" considers her "the sweetest candy." While Ray prepares to kill her, Zooey frees herself and escapes. The Hellmans are reunited at the police station. The police tell Jesse of Ray's murderous history as a child. Ray had explained that he served the Devil and that the murdered children were "His candy". The Hellmans are escorted home, and two police officers are stationed outside the house, with the intention of placing them under witness protection.

Jesse contemplates in his studio and eventually destroys the mural. Meanwhile, Ray kills the officers and takes a gun from one of them. Ray breaks into the house and shoots Jesse and Astrid. He drags Zooey outside to retrieve a gasoline canister before bringing her to her room, dousing the floor, and setting it on fire. Astrid wakes Jesse up and the two leave the house. Jesse climbs through Zooey's bedroom window and fights Ray, whose eyes glow eerily as he catches on fire. Jesse bludgeons Ray to death with his own guitar.

Jesse gets Zooey outside safely. He is drawn to a spot near the house, where he finds the suitcases with the children's bodies that Ray had buried. As the sun rises, Jesse looks to the sky, smiles, and starts to cry.

== Cast ==
- Ethan Embry as Jesse Hellman
- Shiri Appleby as Astrid Hellman
- Pruitt Taylor Vince as Ray Smilie
- Kiara Glasco as Zooey Hellman
- Tony Amendola as Leonard
- Craig Nigh as Realtor
- Leland Orser as Preacher
- Oryan Landa as Deputy Hernandez
- Richard Rollin as Walter Smilie
- Sheila Bailey Lucas as Pamela Smilie
- Marco Perella as Sgt. Investigator Davis
- Mylinda Royer as Deputy Winnie
- Jamie Tisdale as Mara
- Jack Dullnig as Tyler Rosen
- Arthur Dale as Logan

== Release ==
The film premiered at the 2015 Toronto International Film Festival on September 13, 2015. The film was released on March 17, 2017, by IFC Midnight.

== Reception ==
The film has received largely positive reviews. Rotten Tomatoes has the film at 93% with 54 reviews. The site's consensus says, "The Devil's Candy playfully subverts horror tropes while serving up more than enough stylish thrills to satisfy genre enthusiasts". Metacritic, which assigns a normalized rating of 0-100%, gives the film a 72, based on 10 reviews.

Clem Bastow of The Guardian said of the film "this is a horror film made in the true spirit of metal: just like the music it’s inspired by, it’s loud and sometimes gruesome but also winningly earnest". Mark L. Miller of Ain't It Cool News called it "a fantastic film" and "an absolute treasure trove of scares!" Perri Nemiroff of Collider called the film "a standout" and awarded it an A− rating.

On the other hand, Dennis Harvey writing for Variety called the film "a bit of a sophomore slump" and said it was "ultimately a lively but underdeveloped B-horror-thriller". David Rooney of The Hollywood Reporter called the film a "decently acted, disappointingly generic follow-up".
