= 48 Shades =

- Theatrical release poster
- Directed by: Daniel Lapaine
- Written by: Daniel Lapaine
- Based on: 48 Shades of Brown by Nick Earls
- Produced by: Rob Marsala
- Starring: Richard Wilson; Robin McLeavy; Emma Lung; Michael Booth; Nick Donaldson; Victoria Thaine
- Cinematography: Tony Luu
- Edited by: Frans Vandenburg
- Production companies: Prima Productions; Moreton Advisory Group; Australian Film Commission; Pacific Film and Television Commission
- Distributed by: Buena Vista International
- Release dates: August 2006 (BIFF); 31 August 2006 (Australia)
- Running time: 96 minutes
- Country: Australia
- Language: English
- Box office: $193,230

48 Shades (titled Australian Pie: Naked Love in the United States) is a 2006 Australian comedy film by debut director Daniel Lapaine, starring Richard Wilson, Emma Lung, Robin McLeavy, and Victoria Thaine. It is based on Nick Earls's popular 1999 novel 48 Shades of Brown.

It was filmed in Brisbane, Australia. School scenes from the film were filmed in the real-life Brisbane Boys' College. The book on which the film is based has also been adapted into a play for La Boite Theatre Company.

== Plot ==
Dan is a new student at a college in suburban Brisbane, boarding at his (barely older) aunt Jacq's place while his parents are working in Europe. He is reunited with Chris, an old schoolchum with a juvenile sense of humor. One theme of the film is Shakespeare's Romeo and Juliet, for which an assignment is set by the English teacher, and Dan chooses the aquarium scene in Baz Luhrman's film of that name.

Embarrassingly, he becomes besotted with Naomi, a fellow-boarder at Jacq's house. Naomi, a university student, is in a tempestuous relationship with an older man. Dan tries to act sophisticated, pretending skills he does not have, like the identification of Australia's small bush birds (the "48 shades" of brown of the film title).

Jacq throws a party for university students. Shy, awkward Imogen, who has taken a shine to Dan, is violently sick over him; Naomi's boyfriend turns up and they retire to her bedroom. Chris, who has been watching porno clips with a couple of undergraduates, witnesses Jacq and her girlfriend kissing, and reckons it was the "best party ever". He sleeps drunkenly in Dan's bed. Phil, the landlord, who should never touch alcohol, strips and declares his love for Jacq.

The following day Dan and Jacq have a frank talk.

The song "48 Shades" by Beau Young is included in the soundtrack.

== Cast ==
- Richard Wilson as Dan Bancroft
- Robin McLeavy as Jacq
- Emma Lung as Naomi
- Nick Donaldson as Chris Burns, Dan's schoolfriend
- Michael Booth as Phil Borthwick, the landlord
- Victoria Thaine as Imogen
- Eleanor Logan as Lisa
- Paul Bishop as Mr Wilkes
- Cory Robinson as Jason
- Nick Earls as Deli Owner

== Reviews ==
Sandra Hall, of the Sydney Morning Herald, was dismissive of the film, noting that the director failed to reproduce the charm and whimsy of the novel.
