= Rain Shadow (TV series) =

- Genre: Drama
- Created by: Tony Morphett; Jimmy Thomson
- Written by: Tony Morphett; Jimmy Thomson
- Directed by: Fiona Banks; Shawn Seet
- Country of origin: Australia
- Original language: English
- No. of seasons: 1
- No. of episodes: 6

Production
- Executive producers: Errol Sullivan; Miranda Dear; Antonia Barnard
- Producer: Gus Howard
- Production locations: Adelaide Hills, South Australia
- Running time: 60 minutes
- Production company: Southern Star Suntaya

Original release
- Network: ABC TV
- Release: 7 October – 18 November 2007

Rain Shadow is an Australian television drama series which premiered on 7 October 2007 on ABC TV. It aired on Sundays at 8.30 p.m. The six-part series (6 × 1 hour) was produced by Southern Star. Music from The Audreys features in the soundtrack for the show, including the main theme.

Rain Shadow was shot in the Adelaide Hills in South Australia and is set in the fictional district of Paringa, a dry land farming area in a rain shadow. It tells the story of two characters who become the means of each other's future. It stars Rachel Ward as district vet Kate McDonald and Victoria Thaine as new veterinary assistant Jill Blake.

== Cast ==
- Rachel Ward as Kate McDonald
- Victoria Thaine as Jill Blake
- Gary Sweet as Larry Riley
- Heather Mitchell as Sarah Balfour
- Kim Knuckey as Lachlan Balfour
- Shane Withington as Harry Greene
- Tom O'Sullivan as Tom Huppatz
- Carmel Johnson as Ginny Huppatz
- Panda Likoudis as Achmed Aziz
- Grant Piro as James Campbell
- Edwin Hodgeman as Steve Willis
- Nathaniel Dean as Fred Klein
- Michaela Cantwell as Gail Klein
- Brenton Whittle as Kenneth Blake
- Jamie Harding as Andrew Blake
- Nathin Butler as Shane Maguire
- Mollie as Jock, Jill Blake's West Highland White Terrier
- Lily Robinson as Debbie Garland
- Amanda Barkley as Pam (the girl selling puppies)
- Craig Behenna as Patrick
- Alex Vickery-Howe as Ray
- Jude Henshall as Stacey

== Episodes ==
No.	Title	Directed by	Written by	Original release date	Aus. viewers (millions)
1	"The Long Paddock"	Shawn Seet	Tony Morphett	7 October 2007	1.111
2	"You Can't Eat Scenery"	Shawn Seet	Jimmy Thomson	14 October 2007	0.910
3	"Paringa Rules"	Fiona Banks	Tony Morphett	28 October 2007	0.826
4	"Black And White"	Fiona Banks	Tony Morphett	4 November 2007	0.880
5	"The Call of the Wild"	Shawn Seet	Jimmy Thomson	11 November 2007	0.887
6	"The Soldiers Choice"	Fiona Banks	Jimmy Thomson	18 November 2007	0.828

== Awards ==
The show and cast have not won major awards, but have been nominated for several, which include:

- 2008: Victoria Thaine was nominated for Most Outstanding Actress at the Logies.
- 2008: the show was nominated for 'Best Telefeature, Mini Series or Short Run Series' at the AFI Awards.

== See also ==
- South Australian Film Corporation
- List of Australian television series
- List of programs broadcast by ABC (Australian TV network)
