= Deadwax =

2018 American television series

- Series poster
- Written by: Graham Reznick
- Directed by: Graham Reznick
- Starring: Evan Gamble; Hannah Gross; Tracy Perez; Dohn Norwood; Ted Raimi; Yuki Sakamoto
- Composer: Graham Reznick
- Country of origin: United States
- Original language: English
- No. of episodes: 8

Production
- Producer: Barrel Productions

Original release
- Release: November 15, 2018

Deadwax, also stylized deadwax, is a 2018 American horror drama television series that was directed and written by Graham Reznick, who co-wrote the horror video game Until Dawn. The series began streaming on the video on-demand service Shudder on November 15, 2018, and premiered at Fantastic Fest earlier that year on September 23. It stars Hannah Gross as a young woman who is hired to track down a rare vinyl record rumored to have the capability of killing those who listen to it.

The show's title refers to the space between a record label and the final track, where no audio can be recorded.

== Synopsis ==
Note - the synopsis is told in chronological rather than episodic order.

During one of his shows, young college disc jockey Tuck Weston informs a listener that his radio station used to own the Lytton lacquer, a vinyl record created by renowned sound engineer Lyle M. Lytton, who died during its creation. As such, the record captured the sound of Lytton transcending to the next plane of existence – the sound of death itself. Listening to the record in its totality has the capability of killing those who hear it; however the listener jokes that listening to it backwards may be a cure. After the show, a strange woman (revealed as Lily Child in later episodes) contacts Tuck and invites him to listen to the record on behalf of a collector she refers to only as 'null and void'. Unable to resist, Tuck meets Lily and listens to a split second of the record. Later describing the sound as the sound of 'null and void', Tuck is driven insane by strange phenomena.

Many years later, an elderly man listens to the Lytton lacquer and is found dead the following day, mummified. The record is taken into evidence by Len, who listens to a portion of it before bagging it as evidence. His decision is later ridiculed by his co-worker Daryl, who believes the record to have no relevance to the man's death. After being sent off for coffee, Len begins to experience the same phenomena as Tuck and passes out. When he wakes, he discovers that Daryl has been killed in an extremely gruesome fashion. Len is questioned by Detective Kenny Rhodes, who later lets him go after viewing the building's security tapes.

Meanwhile, record finder Etta is informed by one of her clients about a rare grouping of records created by Lytton: three Key records and the Lytton lacquer. If played simultaneously, the Key records are said to produce sounds that have previously gone unheard by any living person. These records can be identified via strange markings etched into the wax located on the deadwax – the space between the grooves and the label. Intrigued, Etta begins investigating despite misgivings by her girlfriend Lana and her mentor Ian, warning her that the record will be nearly impossible to locate and that even listening to a portion of it drives a person insane.

Etta's investigation leads her to Len, her former lover. She agrees to stay over at his house, as he is clearly distraught by his experiences, and subsequently witnesses Len undergo supernatural phenomena. The two travel to meet Tuck, now much older and living in a secluded cabin in the woods. They question him over the Lytton lacquer and ask him if he owns a Key record, which prompts him to angrily chase them out of the cabin; Len kills him with a rock to the head. Afterwards, Etta and Len two discover a hidden briefcase that contains a notebook with markings that lead them to Lily. Lana is able to produce an address for Lily; however when Etta goes to consult Ian, she discovers gruesome remains everywhere and assumes that he died in the same manner as Len's partner.

After the pair arrive at her address, Lily explains that her family previously ran a company that raised lac insects that produced lacquer that could make records of superior quality. She notes that they never had a chance to refine the process, so synthetic products became more popular. Lily apologizes for what Len is going through and states that the Lytton lacquer was never meant to be listened to by itself and that its true purpose has been ignored. She takes Etta and Len to a room where they are prompted to listen to the Key records on perfectly tuned record players and remain in a circle in the center of the players, noted to be the best place to listen. Once they start to experience strange phenomena, they panic, leave the circle, and unsuccessfully try to stop the music before passing out.

When Len comes to, he learns that Ian did not die and that he is in league with Lily. Etta wakes later and finds herself in restraints, witnessing Len being devoured alive by carnivorous lac insects. She passes out again but wakes to find Ian, who says that Len's death made it possible for the insects to become perfectly tuned and produce quality lacquer, allowing them to retune the world together. Etta is discovered by Detective Rhodes, who followed her, only to watch Lily murder him. Etta escapes after killing Lily but is contacted by Ian, who tells her that she is out of tune with the world and that once she hears the Lytton lacquer, she will understand his actions. He also implies that Lana has listened to the Lytton lacquer without first listening to the Key records, which would kill her.

Etta returns home to discover the Lytton lacquer on her record player. Lana is shown in the background, but it is never clarified whether she listened to the lacquer or not, as her body is never clearly seen. Etta places the record on the turntable and briefly hesitates, leaving it up to the viewer if she will listen to the record or not.

== Cast ==
- Hannah Gross as Etta Price
- Evan Gamble as Len Perry
- Tracy Perez as Lana
- Dohn Norwood as Kenny Rhodes
- Ted Raimi as Ian Ullman
- Yuki Sakamoto as Lily Child
- West Liang as Daryl Burnett
- Kirk Bovill as Tuck Weston
  - Chester Rushing as younger Tuck Weston
- James Ransone as Scotty
- Jonah Ray as Radio Caller 1
- Brian Buckley as Rey Dekker

== Development ==
Inspiration for the show came from the record technique of backmasking, where hidden messages are or were believed to have been recorded backwards on a track. Writer and director Graham Reznick was also interested with the impact sound design could have on viewers, as it allows him to alter their perception without having to give visual story clues. Reznick has stated that if the series is continued, he has plans on how to expand the story universe.

== Reception ==
/Film reviewed Deadwax, praising the sound and visuals while criticizing what they saw as a "lack of engaging character development". Character development was also noted in a video review by Bleeding Cool, whose reviewer noted that Etta was a "generic ye olde grizzled detective that we've seen a hundred thousand times before" and that while they liked the premise of the series and the actress, the character needed to be rounded out more.

A review by Bloody Disgusting for the first four episodes of the series was more positive, as they felt that the characters were developed enough for viewers to care about them and that the series' story and visuals thus far were well done.
