= Backtrack (film) =

- Theatrical release poster
- Directed by: Michael Petroni
- Written by: Michael Petroni
- Produced by: Antonia Barnard; Jamie Hilton; Michael Petroni
- Starring: Adrien Brody; Bruce Spence; Sam Neill; Robin McLeavy; Malcolm Kennard; Jenni Baird
- Cinematography: Stefan Duscio
- Edited by: Martin Connor; Luke Doolan
- Music by: Dale Cornelius
- Production companies: Head Gear Films; Metrol Technology; Screen Australia; See Pictures
- Distributed by: Saban Films
- Release dates: 18 April 2015 (Tribeca Film Festival); 29 January 2016 (United Kingdom)
- Running time: 90 minutes
- Countries: Australia; United Kingdom; United Arab Emirates
- Language: English
- Box office: $905,669

Backtrack is a 2015 mystery thriller film written, co-produced, and directed by Michael Petroni. It stars Adrien Brody, Bruce Spence, Sam Neill, Robin McLeavy, Malcolm Kennard and Jenni Baird.

== Plot ==
Troubled psychotherapist Peter Bower has suffered from nightmares and eerie visions ever since the death of his daughter Evie in a street accident a year earlier, for which he blames himself. His wife Carol suffers extreme depression and rarely gets out of bed.

At his practice, Peter meets with several clients referred to him by his mentor, Duncan. One evening Peter finds a young girl in his waiting room. She seems to be mute but gives Peter a card which states her name is Elizabeth Valentine. She writes the numbers 12787 on one of Peter's notepads, before running away, apparently frightened by the sound of the train passing outside.

The next day, Elizabeth again appears in Peter’s waiting room. As a train passes the office, she starts choking, which Peter records, but she disappears before he can speak to her further. He plays the recording to Duncan, who claims he hears nothing, and believes that Peter is hallucinating Elizabeth out of guilt for failing to prevent his daughter's death. Duncan points out that her initials sound like Evie's name.

Back at his office, Peter researches Elizabeth’s name, and discovers she died on 12-7-87. Further research elicits that all his patients actually died on, or within a day or so, of that date. Perplexed, he calls Duncan and asks to speak with him later, and then has a vision of his deceased patients on a train outside his window.

When Peter meets with Duncan, he discovers that Duncan has no reflection and is himself a ghost. Now fully disturbed, Peter consults a map and discovers that all his deceased patients live along a train line leading to his hometown, False Creek. He travels there alone and stays with his father William, a retired cop.

Visiting the local bar, Peter meets a childhood friend, Barry, and tries to discuss with him a horrifying event that happened in their youth. which they agreed to keep a secret. Barry tells Peter to leave him out of any confession.

Apparently, when they were teenagers, Barry led Peter to a secret location his brother told him about, where couples would meet to have sex in their cars. The boys left their bikes at the side of the train tracks and went to spy on a couple in a car. When they heard a train approaching, they raced to move their bikes, but neither got there in time. As a result, the train was violently derailed, killing 47 of the passengers. Peter saw several of the victims, all of whom would become his deceased future clients. He is then terrorized by the ghosts of Evie, Felix (a patient), and Elizabeth.

The next morning, Peter goes to the police station where he confesses to Officer Barbara Henning. She tells him that it is unlikely he will face charges, as the statute of limitations has expired. Peter learns that Barbara is the daughter of one of the deceased passengers. He apologizes, and Barbara tells him that her mother was the only local killed in the accident, and that William was kind to her at the funeral, inspiring her to become a police officer.

Duncan appears to Peter, telling him that there was no way that bicycles lying against the tracks would have derailed the train, and that there was more to the accident. He also urges Peter to remember exactly what distracted him on the day of Evie's death. Peter recalls looking into a toy shop window at a railroad set, specifically, a model of a switch tower. The next morning, he investigates the switch tower beside the tracks and finds Barry, who has committed suicide, hanging inside. When the police arrive, Peter confesses to Barbara that Barry was there the night of the accident as well, but he intentionally left him out of his confession. Later, he tells her about his hallucinations since Evie's death. She does not believe him, but he reveals details about her mother (who was one of his “ghost” patients) that he would not otherwise know. Rattled, she orders him to leave.

A police officer finds an old rusty pin lying on the floor of the switch house and gives it to Barbara, who discovers that it's the insignia of Elizabeth's high school. She pays a visit to William and tells him that she has discovered that the road he apparently drove to get to the aftermath of the crash was blocked off by the derailment; he would have only been able to drive there if his car had already been on the right side of the tracks. Also, Elizabeth was the only victim whose cause of death was deemed inconclusive.

Meanwhile, Peter returns to the switch tower and suddenly remembers all the events of the night of the accident: He had looked through the windows of the switch house to see his father strangling Elizabeth. In her struggle to survive, she accidentally pulled the lever, changing the track points and causing the derailment of the train. Afterwards, William placed her body at the scene of the crash.

Barbara asserts to William that she knows Elizabeth was not a victim of the crash, and she believes that Peter saw something that night that William wanted to be covered up. William knocks her unconscious and puts her in the trunk of her police car. Peter returns and tells William that he knows the truth; he asks William if Elizabeth is his only victim. William pulls a gun and then knocks Peter unconscious.

The next morning, William drives out with both Peter and Barbara restrained in the car. A gun is on the passenger seat. However, the ghost of Elizabeth appears in the road and in the car, startling William and making him lose control of the vehicle. In the process, Peter is thrown out of the backseat of the car and lands a safe distance away, with the gun. William ends up with his car stalled on the train tracks, the engine dead and the doors locked, as a train approaches. Barbara manages to get out of the car and Peter shoots out a window so William can escape. But William is held back by Elizabeth's ghost and crushed by the train. As Peter and Barbara stand on the side of the tracks, Peter sees the ghosts of the victims on the train, and also sees a tranquil Elizabeth turn and depart.

Later, Peter is on the beach with the ghost of Evie, who gets up and walks into the ocean, finally moving on and at peace. His wife joins him and asks what he's thinking about; Peter tells her that he's thinking about kids. Carol smiles, and they embrace.

== Cast ==
- Adrien Brody as Peter Bower
- Bruce Spence as Felix
- Sam Neill as Duncan Stewart
- Robin McLeavy as Barbara Henning
- Malcolm Kennard as Barry
- Jenni Baird as Carol Bower
- Anna Lise Phillips as Erica George
- Chloe Bayliss as Elizabeth Valentine
- Emma O'Farrell as Evie Bower
- Matthew Sunderland as Steve
- George Shevtsov as William Bower

== Release ==
The film premiered on 18 April 2015 at the Tribeca Film Festival. On 24 April 2015 Saban Films acquired distribution rights to the film.

== Reception ==
On review aggregator website Rotten Tomatoes, the film has a rating of 30% based on 40 reviews and an average rating of 4.48/10. The site's consensus reads: "Adrien Brody remains a compelling presence, but those contemplating a screening of this muddled paranormal thriller are advised to Backtrack immediately." On Metacritic, the film has a score of 43 out of 100 based on 10 critics, indicating "mixed or average reviews".
