= Deck Dogz =

- Theatrical release poster
- Directed by: Steve Pasvolsky
- Written by: Steve Pasvolsky
- Produced by: Gary Hamilton; Richard Sheffield
- Starring: Richard Wilson; Sean Kennedy; Ho Thi Lu
- Cinematography: Denson Baker
- Edited by: Jane Moran
- Music by: Reinhold Heil; Johnny Klimek
- Distributed by: Universal Pictures (through United International Pictures)
- Release date: 6 January 2005
- Running time: 90 minutes
- Country: Australia
- Language: English

Deck Dogz is a 2005 Australian sports drama film, written and directed by Steve Pasvolsky and starring Sean Kennedy, Ho Thi Lu and Richard Wilson with a guest appearance by Tony Hawk. It was filmed in and around Adelaide and Sydney, Australia. Deck Dogz was released in Australian theatres on 6 January 2005.

At the ARIA Music Awards of 2005 the soundtrack was nominated for Best Original Soundtrack, Cast or Show Album.

== Plot ==
It is a movie about three teen skaters, played by young Australian actors Richard Wilson, Sean Kennedy and Ho Thi Lu. Their characters Poker, Spasm and Blue Flame, are trying to escape the law, their school, their parents, their demons and a couple of low-life criminals (Brendan Cowell as Kurt and Mitchell McMahon as Pigeon) to realise their burning ambition – to meet world class skating champion, Tony Hawk and compete in his skating competition at the Beachbowl, a major skate competition at Maroubra Beach, in the hope he'll sponsor them. The movie details their skating journey across Sydney's half-pipes and suburbs.

== Cast ==
Actor	Role
Richard Wilson	Robert 'Poker' Benardi
Sean Kennedy	Jay 'Spasm' Filkins
Ho Thi Lu	Phong 'Blue Flame' Trang
Tony Hawk	Himself
Glenda Linscott	Exboobs
Philip Dodd	Brizzo
Anthony Cogin	Jack Filkins
Thomas Campbell	Stickers
Brendan Cowell	Kurt
Mitchell McMahon	Pigeon
Bob Baines	Headmaster Clatwell
Sallyanne Ryan	Miss Fillingham
Alyssa McClelland	Baby T

== Soundtrack ==
Track listing
Songwriters according to Australasian Performing Right Association (APRA), with performers listed after track times.

1. "Introduction" (1:30)
2. "Sayonara" (Phil Jamieson, Johnny Klimek, Reinhold Heil) (4:15) Phil Jamieson
3. "No Man's Land" (NFamas, Johnny Klimek, Reinhold Heil) (3:10) NFamas
4. "One Way" (Cameron Baines, Johnny Klimek, Reinhold Heil) (3:31) Cameron Baines
5. "Dry Land" (Bruce Winter) (2:46) Bruce Winter
6. "Freedom Skate" (Luke Steele, Johnny Klimek, Reinhold Heil) (5:30) Luke Steele
7. "Sayonara" (remix) (Phil Jamieson, Johnny Klimek, Reinhold Heil) (2:02)
8. "Nothing To Say" (Antiskeptic) (3:03)
9. "Murder One" (NFamas, Mass, Johnny Klimek, Reinhold Heil) (2:54) NFamas
10. "Going Away" (Rocket Science) (3:24)
11. "Breaking Out" (Cameron Baines, Johnny Klimek, Reinhold Heil) (3:17) Cameron Baines
12. "Cycles" (Bruce Winter) (3:11) Bruce Winter
13. "No Regrets" (Cameron Baines, Johnny Klimek, Reinhold Heil) (3:25) Cameron Baines
14. "Night Activities" (Johnny Klimek, Reinhold Heil) (3:40)
15. "Mall Chase" (Johnny Klimek, Reinhold Heil) (3:31)
16. "Warehouse II" (Mass, Johnny Klimek, Reinhold Heil) (2:44)
17. "Warehouse III" (Mass, Johnny Klimek, Reinhold Heil) (2:37)
18. "Toilet Fight/Showdown" (Johnny Klimek, Reinhold Heil) (4:13)

== Box office ==
Deck Dogz grossed $286,708 at the box office in Australia.

== See also ==
- Dishdogz
- Grind – 2003 comedy film by Casey La Scala
- Lords of Dogtown
- Dogtown and Z-Boys – 2001 documentary film by Stacy Peralta
