= Sean Byrne (filmmaker) =

Australian filmmaker

- Born: Tasmania, Australia
- Occupation: Filmmaker

Sean Byrne is an Australian filmmaker. He is best known for directing the horror films The Loved Ones (2009), The Devil's Candy (2015), and Dangerous Animals (2025).

For The Loved Ones, he won People's Choice Award, Midnight Madness Category, Toronto International Film Festival, and The Siren Award for Best International Feature, at the Lund International Film Festival. His 2025 feature film Dangerous Animals had its world premiere at the 2025 Cannes Film Festival during the Directors' Fortnight section.

== Filmography ==
Year	Title	Director	Writer
2009	The Loved Ones	Yes	Yes
2015	The Devil's Candy	Yes	Yes
2025	Dangerous Animals	Yes	No
