= Carpenter Community Charter School =

Location
- 3909 Carpenter Avenue, Studio City, California 91604; 34°8′28″N 118°23′35″W

Information
- Type: Public
- Motto: Cultivating young minds for a modern world.
- Established: 1924
- School district: Los Angeles Unified School District
- Principal: Joe Martinez
- Grades: K-5
- Colors: White and blue
- Mascot: Cougar
- Website: carpenteres.lausd.org

Carpenter Community Charter School, formerly Carpenter Avenue Elementary School, is a public K-5 elementary school in Los Angeles, California.

Carpenter Community Charter is part of the Los Angeles Unified School District. The school is in Studio City. The school was opened in 1924 under the name Carpenter Street School and is still in the same location. The Administrative Building was constructed in 1938 in PWA Moderne styling.

The current principal of the school since 2010 (as of August 2021) is Joseph Martinez and the assistant principal is Melodie Hong. In September 2002 the school had a newer, larger library built complete with an Internet connection.

For the 2008–2009 school year Carpenter had an enrollment of 847 students with the following racial/ethnic profile; White 76.3%, Hispanic 8.7%, Asian 8.1%, Black 4.6%, Filipino 1.3%, Other 1%. Carpenter is not eligible for Title I funding. Carpenter receives approximately $300,000 annually via the fundraising efforts of parents.

On June 16, 2010, Carpenter Avenue Elementary School became a Charter school. It then changed its name to Carpenter Community Charter School.

Carpenter has multiple events, including the Carpenter Cooked, an event where children cook meals, Carpenter Movie Night, and the yearly gala. The school motto is "Cultivating young minds for the modern world."
