= 48 Shades of Brown =

Novel by Nick Earls

- Author: Nick Earls
- Language: English
- Genre: Young adult novel
- Published: 1999 (Penguin Books)
- Publication place: Australia
- Media type: Print (Paperback)
- ISBN: 0-14-028769-8
- OCLC: 44838606
- LC Class: PZ7.E1264 Aae 1999

48 Shades of Brown is a young-adult novel by Australian author Nick Earls, published by Penguin Books in 1999. The novel was awarded Children's Book of the Year: Older Readers by the Children's Book Council of Australia in 2000. The novel has been adapted into a play and a film.

== Plot ==
In his final year at school, and with his parents overseas, Dan is forced to grow up fast when he moves in with his 22-year-old aunt Jacq and her eccentric friend Naomi. His story is light-hearted and funny, with a definite twist of insanity.

== Adaptations ==
In 2001, Philip Dean adapted the novel into a play for the La Boite Theatre Company. The play's script was published by Currency Press. The novel was also adapted into a film, titled 48 Shades, which was released on DVD after screening across cinemas in Australia in 2006.
