= Robin McLeavy =

Australian actress

- Born: 19 June 1981 (age 45); Sydney, New South Wales, Australia
- Education: National Institute of Dramatic Art (2004)
- Occupation: Actress
- Years active: 2005–present
- Known for: The Loved Ones (2009); Hell on Wheels (2011–2016)

Robin McLeavy (born 19 June 1981) is an Australian actress.

== Early life and education ==
Robin McLeavy was born on 19 June 1981, in Sydney, New South Wales, Australia. She developed an early interest in the performing arts. Her upbringing was influenced by her mother, an environmental activist who was prominent in the Australian ecological movement during the late 1960s and 1970s. McLeavy has often credited her mother for her own lifelong commitment to environmental awareness.

McLeavy attended high school in Sydney, where she coincidentally attended the same school for a period as director Sean Byrne, who would later cast her in her breakout film role. Following high school, she was accepted into the National Institute of Dramatic Art (NIDA). She graduated in 2004 with a Bachelor of Dramatic Art in Acting.

== Career ==
Shortly after graduating from NIDA, McLeavy began her professional career on the Australian stage and in television. Her first feature film was 2006 comedy-drama 48 Shades, based on Nick Earls' award winning novel, "48 Shades of Brown", in which she played the role of Jacq.

From 2006, McLeavy appeared in four encore seasons of Holding the Man, an award-winning play by Tommy Murphy, based on Timothy Conigrave's 1995 memoir. The following year, she appeared opposite Catherine McClements as Honey in Who's Afraid of Virginia Woolf?, directed by Benedict Andrews for Sydney's Belvoir Theatre Company. The role saw her nominated for Best Supporting Actress at the Sydney Theatre Awards.

McLeavy starred as villain Lola Stone in the critically acclaimed 2009 Australian horror film, The Loved Ones, alongside Xavier Samuel. The film won the Audience Choice Award at Toronto International Film Festival in that same year and an award for Best International Feature at Sweden's Fantastik Film Festival. McLeavy was later nominated for Best Actress at the 2012 Fangoria Chainsaw Awards and the Fright Meter Awards, for her role in the film.

In 2009, McLeavy also played the role of Stella Kowalski opposite Cate Blanchett and Joel Edgerton in a Sydney Theatre Company staging of A Streetcar Named Desire. The production was directed by Liv Ullmann and toured to the Kennedy Center in Washington DC and Brooklyn Academy of Music in New York. She received the Helen Hayes Award for Outstanding Supporting Performer. In 2010, McLeavy played Isabella in Andrews' production of Measure for Measure by William Shakespeare at Belvoir, earning her another Sydney Theatre Awards nomination, this time for Best Actress in a Leading Role.

Between 2011 and 2016, McLeavy played the regular role of frontier tribal abductee survivor Eva Oates on the Western series Hell on Wheels. Her character was inspired by the real story of Olive Oatman. During this time, she also portrayed Nancy Lincoln, the former president's mother in 2012 American action-horror film Abraham Lincoln: Vampire Hunter. Then, the following year, she participated in comedy sketch series The Elegant Gentleman's Guide to Knife Fighting for several episodes.

McLeavy voiced the role of Nutsy the koala, in 2015 Australian animated adventure film Blinky Bill the Movie, alongside Ryan Kwanten, Rufus Sewell, David Wenham, Toni Collette, Richard Roxburgh, Deborah Mailman, Barry Otto, and Barry Humphries. That same year, she played the key role of police officer Barbara Henning in mystery thriller Backtrack, alongside Adrien Brody and Sam Neill.

McLeavy had a recurring role as Maggie McCullough in Netflix American fantasy series Wu Assassins in 2019. She next appeared in 2023 comedy drama series Wolf Like Me, opposite Isla Fisher and Josh Gad, playing the recurring role of Caroline.

In 2024, McLeavy starred as Lauren, alongside Eric Bana, Anna Torv and Jacqueline McKenzie in mystery thriller film Force of Nature: The Dry 2. The following year, McLeavy reunited with The Dry co-star Torv, in several episodes of The Newsreader, playing the role of Marcia Evans.

== Filmography ==
=== Film ===
| Year | Title | Role | Notes | Ref. |
|---|---|---|---|---|
| 2006 | 48 Shades | Jacq | | |
| 2007 | The Other Half | Sarah | Short film | |
| 2009 | The Loved Ones | Lola 'Princess' Stone | | |
| 2010 | After the Credits | Lucy | Short film | |
| 2011 | Roman's Ark | Roman's Wife | Short film | |
| 2012 | Abraham Lincoln: Vampire Hunter | Nancy Lincoln | | |
| 2015 | Blinky Bill the Movie | Nutsy (voice) | Animated film | |
| 2015 | Backtrack | Barbara Henning | | |
| 2023 | Force of Nature: The Dry 2 | Lauren | | |

=== Television ===
| Year | Title | Role | Notes | Ref. |
|---|---|---|---|---|
| 2005 | Last Man Standing | Kellie | Episode: "1.15" | |
| 2007 | The Code | | | |
| 2009 | All Saints | Katherine Burnett | 1 episode | |
| 2011–2016 | Hell on Wheels | Eva | 50 episodes | |
| 2013 | The Elegant Gentleman's Guide to Knife Fighting | Various characters | 6 episodes | |
| 2014 | Super Fun Night | Lucinda | Episode: "Lucindervention" | |
| 2019 | Wu Assassins | Maggie McCullough | 3 episodes | |
| 2020 | Homeland | Charlotte Benson | 2 episodes | |
| 2023 | Wolf Like Me | Caroline | 2 episodes | |
| 2025 | The Newsreader | Marcia Evans | 4 episodes | |
| 2025 | Bay of Fires | Dawn | 1 episode | |

== Theatre ==
=== As actor ===
| Year | Title | Role | Notes | Ref. |
|---|---|---|---|---|
| 2004 | Playhouse Creatures | | Theatre Royal, Hobart | |
| 2006 | Rat Trap | | Seymour Centre, Sydney with NIDA | |
| 2006 | No Names ... No Pack Drill | | NIDA Theatre, Sydney | |
| 2006; 2007 | Holding the Man | | Stables Theatre, Sydney, Sydney Opera House with Griffin Theatre Company | |
| 2007 | Self-Esteem | | Wharf Theatre, Sydney with STC | |
| 2007 | The Merchant of Venice | | Belvoir Theatre, Sydney | |
| 2007 | Who's Afraid of Virginia Woolf? | Honey | Belvoir Theatre Company | |
| 2008 | The Great | Catherine the Great | Wharf Theatre, Sydney with STC | |
| 2009 | A Streetcar Named Desire | Stella Kowalski | Australian tour, Kennedy Center, Washington DC & Brooklyn Academy of Music, New York with STC | |
| 2010 | Measure for Measure | Isabella | Belvoir Theatre, Sydney | |
| 2016 | Miss Julie | Miss Julie | MTC | |
| 2020 | Girls & Boys | | Fairfax Studio, Melbourne with MTC | |

=== As dramaturge ===
| Year | Title | Role | Notes | Ref. |
|---|---|---|---|---|
| 2022; 2023 | Betty is a Butcher | Dramaturge | East Sydney Community & Arts Centre (ESCAC), PACT Theatre, Sydney with Siren Theatre Company | |

== Awards and nominations ==
| Year | Work | Award | Category | Result | Ref. |
|---|---|---|---|---|---|
| 2007 | Who's Afraid of Virginia Woolf? | Sydney Theatre Awards | Best Supporting Actress | Nominated | |
| 2010 | A Streetcar Named Desire | Helen Hayes Awards | Outstanding Supporting Performer in a Non-Resident Production | Won | |
| 2010 | Measure for Measure | Sydney Theatre Awards | Best Actress in a Leading Role | Nominated | |
| 2011 | Measure for Measure | Helpmann Awards | Best Female Actor in a Play | Nominated | |
| 2012 | The Loved Ones | Fangoria Chainsaw Awards | Best Actress | Nominated | |
| 2012 | The Loved Ones | Fright Meter Awards | Best Actress | Nominated | |
| 2016 | Miss Julie | Green Room Awards | Best Female Performer | Nominated | |
