= Dohn Norwood =

American actor

Dohn Norwood is an American actor who has appeared in the television series Hell on Wheels (2011–16). He has starred on The Sinner since 2017.

== Personal life ==
Norwood married Marlene Glasper in 2013.

== Filmography ==
=== Film ===
Year	Title	Role	Notes
2003	Bruce Almighty	Police Training Center Officer	
2006	Mini's First Time	Paramedic #1	
2007	Doing the L.A. Thing	Vernon	
2008	Welcome to Los Feliz	A-yo	
2018	What Still Remains	Ben	
2018	Custody Road	Jack	
2019	Adopt a Highway	Cato	
2020	John Henry	Midnight	

=== Television ===
Year	Title	Role	Notes
1997	First Time Felon	James	Television film
2002, 2003	ER	Mr. Persky / MP	2 episodes
2003	Kingpin	Police Officer	Episode: "Black Magic Woman"
2003	The Practice	Alex Gaul	Episode: "Baby Love"
2003	10-8: Officers on Duty	Deputy #2	Episode: "Brothers in Arms"
2004	Strong Medicine	Amber's Tour Manager	Episode: "Touched by an Idol"
2005	Without a Trace	Ben	Episode: "End Game"
2006	Bones	Black Man	Episode: "The Blonde in the Game"
2007	Numbers	Captain Hazlett	Episode: "Burn Rate"
2007	The Closer	Kenyon Richards	Episode: "Grave Doubts"
2007	Entourage	Security Guard	Episode: "The Dream Team"
2008	Raising the Bar	Tyrell Stevens	Episode: "Pilot"
2009	Castle	Charles Oni	Episode: "Always Buy Retail"
2010	Sons of Anarchy	Grim Bastard	Episode: "The Push"
2010	Law & Order: LA	Mr. Tasker	Episode: "Sylmar"
2011	Harry's Law	Attaché of Tanzanian Consulate	Episode: "American Dreams"
2011–2016	Hell on Wheels	Psalms Jackson	38 episodes
2012	Southland	Dede Crawford	Episode: "Community"
2014	NCIS	Sherman T. Harper	Episode: "Semper Fortis"
2016	Grey's Anatomy	Lou	Episode: "The Sound of Silence"
2016	NCIS: Los Angeles	Colonel Joaddan Salli	Episode: "Revenge Deferred"
2016	All the Way	Ralph Abernathy	Television film
2016	12 Deadly Days	Detective Stan	2 episodes
2017	Hap and Leonard	Reverend Fitzgerald	4 episodes
2017	Animal Kingdom	Joe	2 episodes
2017	Hawaii Five-0	Ronnie Turner	Episode: "He Kaha Lu'u Ke Ala, Mai Ho'okolo Aku"
2017–2018	The Sinner	Dan Leroy	9 episodes
2018	Deadwax	Kenny Rhodes	4 episodes
2019	The Rookie	Deacon Joe	Episode: "Manhunt"
2019	Station 19	Captain Ted Conlin	Episode: "Friendly Fire"
2019	Mindhunter	Commissioner Lee Brown	5 episodes
2020	Marlo Lasker	Pastor King	Television film
2020	Zoey's Extraordinary Playlist	Pastor Steve	Episode: "Zoey's Extraordinary Neighbor"
2020	Magnum P.I.	Milo Rivers	Episode: "Say Hello to Your Past"
2020	Bosch	George Langworthy	Episode: "Three Widows"
2020	Hightown	Alan Saintille	8 episodes
2021	Bad Vibes	Dante	Episode: "Shifter"
2025	Tracker	Deon Crawford	Episode: "Exodus"
