= Nick Earls =

Australian novelist

- Born: Nicholas Francis Ward Earls; 8 October 1963 (age 63); Newtownards, Northern Ireland, United Kingdom
- Occupation: Novelist
- Website: nickearls.wordpress.com

Nicholas Francis Ward Earls (born 8 October 1963) is a novelist from Brisbane, Australia, who writes humorous popular fiction about everyday life. The majority of his novels are set in his home town of Brisbane. He fronted a major Brisbane tourism campaign.

== Biography ==
Earls was born on 8 October 1963 in Newtownards, Northern Ireland. He emigrated to Australia with his parents and sister at the age of nine. Living in Brisbane, he was educated at the Anglican Church Grammar School there. He completed a medical degree at the University of Queensland and worked as a GP before turning to writing.

== Career ==
Earls has been compared to Nick Hornby. Zigzag Street, his second novel, won the Betty Trask Award in 1998 (sharing with Kiran Desai's Hullaballoo in the Guava Orchard). His young-adult novel, 48 Shades of Brown, won the Children's Book Council of Australia Book of the Year Award for older readers in 2000. Several of his novels (After January and 48 Shades of Brown) have been adapted for theatre, and 48 Shades of Brown was adapted into a film entitled 48 Shades, released in August 2006. Earls has also written other novels, including Bachelor Kisses (which borrows its title from a song by Brisbane band The Go-Betweens), Perfect Skin, World of Chickens, The Thompson Gunner, and young adult novels After January, and Making Laws for Clouds.

Earls has also contributed to the four best-selling anthologies in the Girls' Night In series as well as Kids' Night In and Kids' Night in 2 as editor. His most recent novels are Welcome to Normal, a collection of original short stories, The True Story of Butterfish, about a former rock star re-adjusting to mundane life in the Brisbane suburbs, and Monica Bloom, based on his own adolescent experience of an ill-fated crush.

Several of his books have been adapted for the stage by Brisbane's La Boite Theatre Company.

He is referenced in the film All My Friends Are Leaving Brisbane.

== Bibliography ==
Year	Work	Notes
2021	Empires	novel
2017	Wisdom Tree	novella series
2015	New Boy	novel
2014	Analogue Men	novel
2012	Welcome to Normal	short stories
2011	The Fix	novel
2009	The True Story of Butterfish	novel
2007	Joel and Cat Set the Story Straight	young adult novel, co-written with Rebecca Sparrow
2007	A revealed life: Australian writers and their journeys in memoir	collection of memoirs from Australian writers, including Nick Earls, edited by Julianne Schultz
2006	Monica Bloom	young adult novel
2006	Making waves: 10 years of the Byron Bay Writers Festival	collection of short works by Australian authors, including Nick Earls, edited by Marele Day, Susan Bradley Smith and Fay Knight
2004	The Thompson Gunner	novel
2003	Kid's Night In	edited by Jessica Adams, Juliet Partridge and Nick Earls
2002	Making Laws for Clouds	young adult novel
2001	World of Chickens	novel
2000	Penguin Australian Summer Stories 3	collection of short stories by Australian authors including Nick Earls
2000	Perfect Skin	novel
1999	48 Shades of Brown	young adult novel
1998	Bachelor Kisses	novel. Set in a house in Bayliss Street, Toowong, Brisbane, Australia.
1998	There Must Be Lions: Stories About Mental Illness	with Sonya Hartnett and Heide Seaman, features Nick Earl's short story There Must Be Lions
1998	The Gift of Story	edited by Marion Halligan and Rosanne Fitzgibbon, features Nick Earls' short story Plaza
1996	Zigzag Street	novel. Set in a house addressed as 34 Zigzag Street, Red Hill, Brisbane, Australia.
1996	After January	young adult novel
1996	Smashed: Australian drinking stories	collection, edited by Matthew Condon and Richard Lawson, includes Nick Earls' short story Green
1996	Original Sin	edited by Robyn Sheahan, includes Nick Earls' short story Box-shaped Heart
1996	Sporting Declaration	edited by Manfred Jurgensen, includes Nick Earls' short story PE
1996	Blur: Stories by young Australian writers	edited by James Bradley, includes Nick Earls' short story Head games
1995	Paradise To Paranoia: New Queensland Writing	edited by Nigel Krauth and Robyn Sheehan, includes Nick Earls' short story Meanwhile, thirty-eight above Charlotte
1995	Picador New Writing 3	edited by Drusilla Modjeska and Beth Yahp, includes Nick Earls' short story The Goatflap brothers and the house of names
1995	Nightmares in Paradise	compiled by Robyn Sheahan, includes Nick Earls' short story Juliet

=== For children ===
==== Series: Word Hunters ====
1. Earls, Nick; Whidborne, Terry (2012). The curious dictionary. St Lucia, Qld: University of Queensland Press.

=== Short fiction ===
Title	Year	First published	Reprinted/collected
Moving	1993	Earls, Nick (1993). "Moving". Outrider: A Journal of Multicultural Literature in Australia. 10: 49–58. Issue titled Queensland, words and all.	Earls, Nick (1999). Headgames. Ringwood, Vic: Penguin. pp. 233–246.
Dog 1, Dog 2	1993	Earls, Nick (1993). "Dog 1, Dog 2". Outrider: A Journal of Multicultural Literature in Australia. 10: 59–64. Issue titled Queensland, words and all.	Earls, Nick (1999). Headgames. Ringwood, Vic: Penguin. pp. 73–84.; Kaminsky, Leah, ed. (2010). The pen and the stethoscope. Carlton North, Vic: Scribe. pp. 156–164.

==== Collections ====
- Earls, Nick (1992). Passion. St Lucia, Qld: University of Queensland Press.
- — (1999). Headgames. Ringwood, Vic: Penguin.
- — (2012). Welcome to Normal. North Sydney, NSW: Vintage.

=== Poetry ===
- Earls, Nick (1985). Near and far away. Clayfield, Qld: Boolarong.

=== Critical studies and reviews ===
- Poacher, Jeffrey (September 2011). "Comic spin". Australian Book Review (334): 50. Review of The fix.
- Introduction to a reissue of The Delinquents by Criena Rohan, 2014 Retrieved 17 October 2015
