= Kasha Kropinski =

South African-American actress

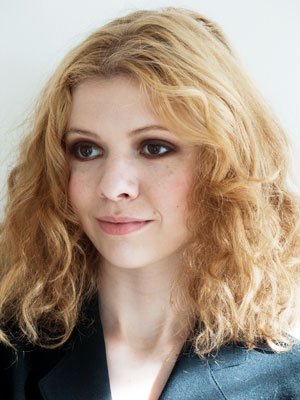
- Born: Katarzynka Kropiński; 1991 (age 34–35)
- Education: Carpenter Avenue Elementary School
- Occupation: Actress
- Agent: SA Entertainment Group
- Website: www.kashak.info

Kasha Kropinski (born Katarzynka Kropiński 1991) is a South African-American actress.

== Personal life ==
Kasha was born in South Africa, the daughter of Jacek Kropiński and Debbie Cochrane. Jacek is a filmmaker and Debbie is a former international model.

== Career ==
Kasha started out at the age of 6, performing lead roles on stage with a Cape Town theatre troupe, Stagecraft. Her roles included Christopher Robin, Peter Rabbit, Noddy, Mowgli, Frankie Fox in Fantastic Mr Fox, earning high praise from theatre critics.

At this time, Kasha also gained distinction in her Trinity College London Drama exams. Concurrently, Kasha also performed in Ballet Eisteddfods and earned 5 gold medal awards.

At the age of 9, Kasha and her parents moved to Los Angeles where she began doing guest roles on TV: Angel, Without a Trace, State of Grace, Crossing Jordan, ER, The Shield, Dirt, and Zoey 101. She also did ADR (Automated Dialogue Replacement, or Additional Dialogue Recording: a form of audio dubbing) work for features Big Fish, The Hunted, The Village and Mrs. Harris. She voiced the puppy Penny in Disney's 101 Dalmatians II: Patch's London Adventure and Miss Holly in Disney's Prep and Landing Holiday Special. She also continued with her ballet and danced roles in the 2003 and 2004 productions of the Nutcracker ballets.

On graduating from Carpenter Avenue Elementary School in Studio City, she received the President's Award for Outstanding Academic Excellence. Due to her ballet and acting schedule, she continued her schooling via a home-school program where she was offered to join the National Honor Society.

At the age of 11, Kasha was chosen to perform the lead role in the proposed Andrew Lippa musical, A Little Princess, and took part in a Broadway presentation for investors in New York.

When she returned to Los Angeles, she was cast in the South African film The Story of an African Farm (released in the United States as Bustin' Bonaparte: The Story of an African Farm), as one of the lead characters Lyndall, playing opposite Richard E. Grant and Armin Mueller-Stahl. This movie was based on the classic literary work by Olive Schreiner and filmed in the Little Karoo semi-desert outside Cape Town, South Africa.

Kasha has attended the Royal Ballet summer school in England, the San Francisco Ballet summer school and was a finalist in Tomorrow's Stars which showcases the very best young adult performers from Southern California in music, dance and voice. She appeared in the 2009 movie Fame in the role of Ballerina.

In the summer of 2009, Kasha attended the LAMDA (London Academy of Music and Dramatic Art) summer school in London, England, and on returning to Los Angeles, danced two roles in the ballet Cinderella.

In 2011, Kasha was cast as Ruth Cole in the AMC TV series Hell on Wheels, a show about the community that worked in the mobile encampment which followed the First Transcontinental Railroad across America. She appeared in seasons one to four.

== Filmography ==
- The Magicians (American TV series) - Enid (Season 4, Episode 4: Marry... Kill)
- Night Shift (TV series) - Bernadine (Season 4, Episode 10: Resurgence)
- MacGyver (2016 TV series) - Katarina Wagner (Episode 5: Toothpick)
- Underwater Upside Down (2016) - Grace Conway
- The Librarians - Lucy Lyons (Season 2, Episode 4: And the Cost of Education)
- Hell on Wheels - Ruth (Series Regular)
- Prep and Landing - Miss Holly
- Fame - Ballerina
- Dirt "Dirty, Slutty Whores" - Reagan
- Zoey 101 "Trading Places" - Tabitha
- ER "White Guy, Dark Hair" - Mia
- Crossing Jordan "Fire in the Sky" - Kimmy Moran
- Oliver Beene "Oliver & the Otters" - Voice
- The Story of an African Farm - Lyndall
- Without a Trace "Wannabe" - Lisa Potter
- The Shield "Carte Blanche" - Patty Ann Hinkle
- 101 Dalmatians II: Patch's London Adventure - (voice) Penny
- State of Grace "A Taste of Money" - Annette Wheeler
- Phantom Investigators "Were-Dog" - Melanie
- Angel "Lullaby" & "Quickening" - Sarah Holtz
- Mrs. Harris (ADR artist)
- The Village (ADR artist)
- Big Fish (ADR artist)
- The Cat in the Hat (ADR artist)
