= Grainger Hines =

American actor

- Born: August 18, 1948 (age 78); Greenwood, South Carolina, U.S.
- Years active: 1963–present
- Partner: Michelle Phillips (1981–1984)

Grainger Hines (born August 18, 1948) is an American actor, writer, producer, and director.

== Career ==
He has appeared in numerous television shows - True Blood, Boston Legal, Nip/Tuck, CSI: Miami, Cold Case, Las Vegas, Matlock, Saving Grace, Ghost Whisperer, In the Heat of the Night, Blue Bloods, Airwolf, The Fall Guy, Star Trek: The Next Generation (uncredited), Hell on Wheels among others. He also has appeared in many films such as Lincoln, Protocol, Innerspace, Rocky II, False Identity, Abuse of Power, Thicker Than Water, Amber Waves, Summer School Teachers, and others. Hines also appeared in the miniseries War and Remembrance and The Alamo: Thirteen Days to Glory. Hines also starred in the soap opera, One Life to Live as Brian Beckett from 1984 - 1986, General Hospital as Kyle Morgan from 1990 - 1991 and The City as Malcolm Christerphor from 1994 - 1995. Hines made his New York stage debut in Valentine's Day, directed by Horton Foote, and has appeared in many plays in New York and Los Angeles. From 2014 to 2015, Hines portrayed Captain August Robertson in the Cinemax TV series The Knick.

He wrote, produced and starred in the western drama, The Outsider and directed the horror thriller, The Mill.

Hines was a member of musical group The Swingin' Medallions between 1968 and 1971.

== Personal life ==
Hines has a son, Austin, with The Mamas & the Papas's singer Michelle Phillips. Hines also has another son, Gray, from another relationship. Hines continues to write, produce, direct and act in television and films.

== Partial filmography ==
Year	Film	Role
1972	Together for Days	Shelley's Dance Partner
1974	Summer School Teachers	Bob
1975	The Day of the Locust	French Lt.
1979	Rocky II	Emergency Room Aide
1984	Protocol	Jerry
1987	Innerspace	Rusty
1990	False Identity	Tommy
1991	Soldier's Fortune	Link
1993	Street Knight	Murphy
1994	Discretion Assured	Austin
1994	The Outsider	John Gower
1997	Strong Island Boys	Coach
1999	When	Austin
2000	Just for the Time Being	Mike Fischer
2000	Sally	Ben
2000	A Terceira Morte de Joaquim Bolívar	Michael Phillips
2004	Beacon Hill	Spanky Reardon
2008	Ghost Whisperer	Detective Pete Richardson
2008	The Mill	A Killer
2010	Beneath the Dark	Tim
2012	Lincoln	Gideon Welles
2013	Slightly Single in L.A.	Detective Johnson
2013	Bloodline	Ranger Ray
2013	Martial Science	Dick Roberts
2014	Hot Bath an' a Stiff Drink	Sheriff Roscoe Hardin
2014	North Blvd	Sid
2015	Hollywood	Dave
2015	The Family Fang	Sheriff Hale
2016	JOB's Daughter	Sheriff Conolly
2016	C Street	Reverend Fink
2017	Kensho at the Bedfellow	Frank
2018	The Ballad of Buster Scruggs	Mr. Arthur
2021	Dr. Death	Earl Burke
2023	Muzzle	Aldo Damon
