= Tina Marsh =

American jazz vocalist and composer

- Born: Kristin Conway Marsh; January 18, 1954; Annapolis, Maryland, U.S.
- Died: June 16, 2009 (aged 55) Austin, Texas, U.S.
- Genres: Jazz
- Occupation: Singer
- Years active: 1979–2009
- Label: CreOp Muse
- Formerly of: Creative Opportunity Orchestra

Tina Marsh (January 18, 1954, – June 16, 2009) was a jazz vocalist and composer based in Austin, Texas. She was the creative director of the Creative Opportunity Orchestra, a large jazz ensemble which she founded in 1980.

== Early life and career ==
Marsh was born in Annapolis, Maryland. During the late-1970s, she worked as an actor in musical theatre in and around New York City and Philadelphia. While living in New York, she began forming ideas about jazz singing. After moving to Austin, Marsh attended concerts by Anthony Braxton and Sam Rivers at Armadillo World Headquarters. These performances inspired her to form her first professional group, New Visions Ensemble, with Alex Coke, Rock Savage, Booka Michel, and Horatio Rodriguez.

In 1980, at the suggestion of Charlie Haden, Marsh studied at the Creative Music Studio in Woodstock, New York. Upon returning to Austin, she formed the Creative Opportunity Orchestra with the members of New Visions Ensemble at its core. CO_{2} began as a cooperative organization, similar to the AACM, though Marsh gradually assumed a managerial role and became the group's director.

Marsh went on to perform with Carla Bley, Hamiett Bluiett, Vinny Golia, Dennis González, Billy Hart, Roscoe Mitchell, Steve Swallow, and Kenny Wheeler. Marsh and the ensemble performed at the Laguna Gloria amphitheater in Austin. She was a participant in the Austin Jazz Workshop.

In 1994, Marsh was diagnosed with and treated for breast cancer. In February 2008, she learned that the cancer had returned and metastasized, though she continued to record and perform later in the year. Marsh died on June 16, 2009. She continued to perform up to two months before her death.

== Awards and honors ==
In 2000, the Austin Chronicle inducted Marsh into its Texas Music Hall of Fame. In 2008, the Austin Critics Table inducted Marsh into the Austin Arts Hall of Fame.

The Austin History Center maintains a collection of Marsh's papers.

C. Michael Bailey of All About Jazz described Marsh's music as "progressive big band, a kind of marriage between the avant-garde and postmodern classical. Marsh, like [Carla] Bley, favors low brass in assembly and solos. She uses her voice in a creative Meredith Monk sort of way that is not unattractive."

== Discography ==
=== As leader ===
- The Heaven Line, with the Creative Opportunity Orchestra (CreOp Muse, 1994)
- World Wide (CreOp Muse, 1998)

With Alex Coke

- Iraqnophobia (VoxLox, 2005)
- It's Possible (VoxLox, 2008)
