= Ray Aghayan =

Iranian-American fashion designer (1928-2011)

- Born: Gorgen Ray Aghayan; July 28, 1928; Tehran, Iran
- Died: October 10, 2011 (aged 83); Los Angeles, California, U.S.
- Occupation: Costume designer
- Partner: Bob Mackie

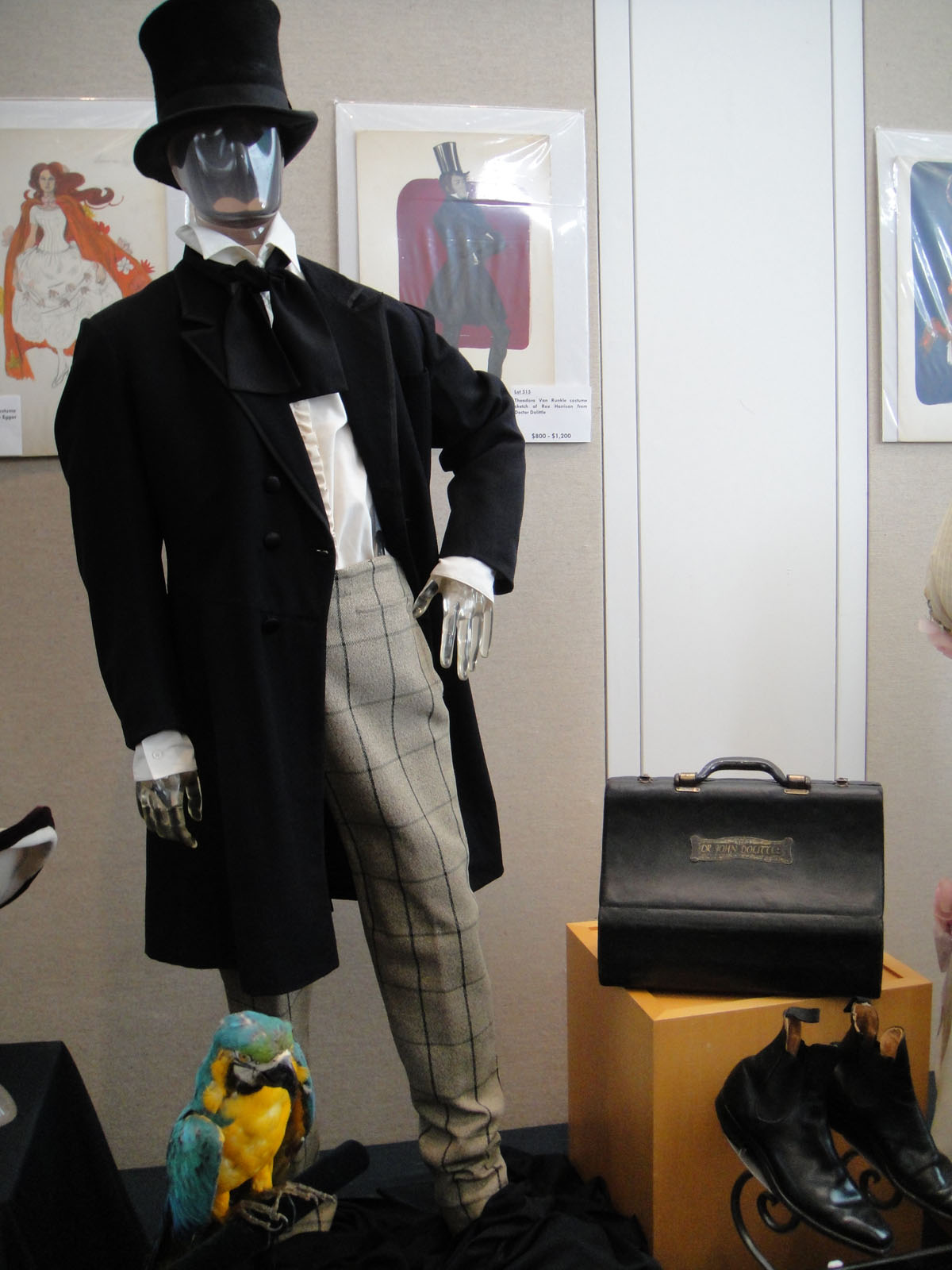
Ray Aghayan costume design for Rex Harrison in Doctor Dolittle (1967)

Gorgen Ray Aghayan (July 28, 1928 – October 10, 2011) was an Iranian fashion designer and costume designer for the United States film industry. He won an Emmy Award and was nominated for three Academy Awards for his costume design. From the early 1960s until his death in 2011, Aghayan's partner was fashion designer Bob Mackie.

== Early life and education ==
Aghayan was born in Tehran, Iran, to a wealthy Iranian-Armenian family. Aghayan's mother, widowed when he was young, was a dressmaker for the Pahlavi family.

At age 13, Aghayan assisted in designing for the court of Shah Mohammad Reza Pahlavi.

His first dress design was for Fawzia Fuad of Egypt, the first wife of the last Shah of Iran.

During the 1940s, Aghayan came to California as a young man.

== Biography ==
In the 1950s, Aghayan started working in television costuming in Los Angeles. In 1963–64, Aghayan designed dresses and costumes for Judy Garland for her musical variety show on CBS.

He won an Emmy Award in 1967 with his partner Bob Mackie for his work in Alice Through the Looking Glass (1966 film).

In 1969, he was the costume consultant on the 41st Academy Awards ceremony, working with show producer/director Gower Champion. Aghayan said, "One of the specific assignments Gower has given me for the show is the coordination of a portion of the program featuring dancers in the actual costumes which have been nominated for best achievement in costume design."

Aghayan was himself nominated for an Academy Award for Best Costume Design three times for his work in Gaily, Gaily in 1970, Lady Sings the Blues in 1973 and Funny Lady in 1976. In 2008, he received the Costume Designers Guild Career Achievement Award.

He was also responsible for designing the costumes for the opening and closing ceremonies of the 1984 Summer Olympics held in Los Angeles.

Aghayan was the producer of the 1985 television drama Consenting Adult based on Laura Z. Hobson's novel about a teenage boy (played by Barry Tubb) coming out to his parents (played by Marlo Thomas and Martin Sheen).

Aghayan died on October 10, 2011, at his home in Los Angeles, California of a myocardial infarction.

== Personal life ==
His mother joined Aghayan in California 30 years after his immigration, and just before the Iranian Revolution.

Aghayan later became the lifetime partner of costume designer Bob Mackie for nearly 50 years. Early in Bob Mackie's career in the 1960s, he was Aghayan's assistant.
