= Uncommon Valor =

1983 film by Ted Kotcheff

- Theatrical release poster
- Directed by: Ted Kotcheff
- Screenplay by: Joe Gayton
- Story by: Wings Hauser
- Produced by: Buzz Feitshans; John Milius
- Starring: Gene Hackman; Fred Ward; Reb Brown; Randall "Tex" Cobb; Patrick Swayze; Harold Sylvester; Tim Thomerson; Robert Stack
- Cinematography: Stephen H. Burum
- Edited by: Mark Melnick
- Music by: James Horner
- Distributed by: Paramount Pictures
- Release date: December 16, 1983
- Running time: 105 minutes
- Country: United States
- Language: English
- Budget: ~$11 million
- Box office: $30.5 million

Uncommon Valor is a 1983 American action war film directed by Ted Kotcheff and starring Gene Hackman, Fred Ward, Reb Brown, Randall "Tex" Cobb, Robert Stack, Patrick Swayze, Harold Sylvester and Tim Thomerson. Hackman plays a former U.S. Marine colonel, who puts together a rag-tag team to rescue his son, who he believes is among those still held in Laos after the Vietnam War. The film was released on December 16, 1983, and received mixed reviews from critics.

== Plot ==
In 1972, a group of American soldiers in South Vietnam flee to a helicopter landing zone while under fire. As one soldier is wounded, another picks him up, but they are left behind with a few others as the area comes under heavy fire. A helicopter carrying "Blaster", "Sailor" and Wilkes call out for their fellow soldiers as their helicopter departs.

A decade later, retired Marine Colonel Jason Rhodes is obsessed with finding his son Frank, an Army Lieutenant listed as "missing in action" since 1972. A ten year search of Southeast Asia has turned up several leads, convincing Rhodes that Frank is being kept in Laos as a prisoner of war.

After unsuccessfully petitioning the United States government for help, Colonel Rhodes brings together a disparate group of Vietnam War veterans, including three men who served in Frank's LRRP (Long Range Reconnaissance Patrol) unit "recon team Arizona" of the 1st battalion, 11th infantry, 196th infantry brigade. They include the three men who evacuated on the helicopter: demolitions expert "Blaster;" Wilkes, a tunnel rat who suffers from PTSD; and "Sailor," a troubled machine gunner. They're joined by two helicopter pilot acquaintances of Rhodes, Distinguished Flying Cross recipient Major Curtis Johnson, and a cropduster named Charts. Former Force Recon Marine Kevin Scott, a non-Vietnam vet, joins the team and later turns out to be the son of a pilot who went missing in action in Vietnam.

With the financial backing of good friend and rich oilman McGregor, whose son also went missing while serving in Frank's unit, the group trains near Galveston, Texas to prepare for the rescue mission at a remote POW camp in Laos. The team flies to Southeast Asia, but the CIA intercepts Rhodes in Bangkok. Fearing an international crisis, they confiscate his weapons and equipment. Undeterred, the team pools the expense money given by McGregor and purchases replacement weapons and supplies from black market arms dealer acquaintance of deposed drug baron Jiang, who joins the expedition with his two daughters, Lai Fun and Mai Lin. The team is rearmed with World War II-era weapons and sets out toward the location of the camp.

The group is soon attacked near the Laotian border by a border patrol unit and Mai Lin is killed. The team then splits up for the final assault. Rhodes leads Charts, Sailor, Johnson and Lai Fun as the "air team" to a helicopter compound to secure escape transportation, while Jiang, Blaster, Scott, and Wilkes scout the prison camp as the "ground team." After securing three helicopters, Rhodes and Charts are later shot down during the assault on the camp. They discover four Americans among the prisoners, but can't verify Frank's whereabouts. Blaster sets demolition charges outside the camp under cover of darkness. He later detonates them to prevent the prisoners from leaving the camp, sacrificing himself in the process. The prisoners are freed; among them McGregor's son, but Frank is not among them. Jiang is killed during the attack. When the surviving team and POWs withdraw to the remaining helicopter, the guards attempt to deploy a rocket launcher, but a mortally wounded Sailor pulls the pin on his grenade and jumps from a guard tower killing himself with the rocket crew. The helicopter escapes with Rhodes, Wilkes, Scott, Charts, Johnson, Lai Fun and all four liberated American POWs.

McGregor's son tells Rhodes, that Frank died of illness, despite his attempt to help him. It is revealed that Frank was the soldier who stopped to carry a wounded McGregor during the platoon's evacuation to the helicopters in 1972 (as seen in the opening scene). McGregor tells Rhodes that Frank saved his life that day.

The group returns to the U. S. to well-attended gathering with the press and families of the POWs. McGregor embraces his son, as other freed POWs receive welcomes from their families. Finally finding closure about Frank, Rhodes embraces his wife.

== Cast ==
- Gene Hackman as Colonel Jason Rhodes
- Fred Ward as Wilkes
- Reb Brown as "Blaster"
- Randall "Tex" Cobb as "Sailor"
- Patrick Swayze as Kevin Scott
- Harold Sylvester as Major Curtis Johnson
- Tim Thomerson as "Charts"
- Robert Stack as Harry MacGregor
- Kwan Hi Lim as Jiang
- Lau Nga Lai as Lai Fun
- Gail Strickland as Helen Rhodes
- Jerry Kemp as Ferryman
- Charles Aidman as Senator Hastings
- Debi Parker as Mai Ling
- Jane Kaczmarek as Mrs. Wilkes
- Kelly Junkerman as Paul MacGregor

Other notable appearances include Michael Dudikoff as Blaster's assistant, Constance Forslund as Mrs. Charts, Todd Allen as Frank Rhodes, Don Mantooth as a POW, Tad Horino as Mr. Ky, Gloria Stroock as Mrs. MacGregor, Jan Triska as Gericault, and Barret Oliver as a kid.

== Production ==
The film began with a screenplay by actor Wings Hauser, who says he was inspired by the stories of a childhood friend, Gary Dickerson, who had been to Vietnam. "I saw that he had left something behind in Viet Nam and that triggered the whole thing," said Hauser. "And then, I became aware of the MIA and the POW situation and said: "Well, that will be the excuse to go back to Nam and get the POWs", but, what they're really going back for is their own clarity and their own integrity, right? And that's the story. That's the whole film."

Hauser says it took 18 months to write the script which he sold to Paramount. The film had at least five title changes, including Last River to Cross.

John Milius became attached as producer. The script was rewritten by Joe Gayton. Hauser lost screenplay credit in arbitration however he received sole "Story by" credit. In 1989, Hauser said, without restrictions: "John Milius is a scumbag right-wing bastard and I can't wait for his day to die! That son of a bitch! The (other) guy who got the credit, he was a punk! I don't think he’s sold anything since and I have and he's a joke!"

Paramount sent Gayton's script to director Ted Kotcheff late, in January 1983. The following month it came out that James Gritz, a former lieutenant colonel in the Green Berets (and the man that both the characters Rambo and Hannibal Smith are based on), had led a secret mission into Laos the previous November to search for MIA American soldiers which ended when they were ambushed by Laotian soldiers. Kotcheff said "We assiduously avoided anything in our story similar to Gritz. Our research amazingly showed there were some 30 groups training for similar missions."

Kotcheff said that Milius did write "two or three scenes" as well as making "a number of very creative suggestions" on the script. Among the scenes Milius wrote included one where Hackman gives a speech to the other soldiers about Vietnam being like a company that has gone bankrupt. "It was a wonderful speech", said Kotcheff, adding Milius "did write under pressure, but mainly he functioned as a producer."

Milius said he wanted James Arness to play the lead role rather than Gene Hackman.

=== Filming ===
Filming started June 6, 1983. The Laotian POW camp that forms the climax of the film was built on a private ranch in the Lumahai Valley on the island of Kauaʻi, Hawaii, and was filmed in early August, 1983. The opening scene depicting the Vietnam War was filmed a short distance away in a rice paddy, two miles (3.2 km) from central Hanalei, Hawaii, and 200 yards (183 m) from the Kuhio Highway (Route 56). Additional parts of the film were shot in Salt Lake City, Utah, Sun Valley, California, and Castaic, California (which served as the training camp). The film was shot for "slightly less than" $11 million.

The helicopters used in the film were purchased (as opposed to rented) and repainted, since the United States Department of Defense was unwilling to rent out the production military-spec Bell UH-1N Iroquois or Bell 206B Jet Ranger helicopters due to the apparent "anti-government" nature of the film.

Milius hired a composer without Paramount's consent and studio chief Jeffrey Katzenberg overruled Milius.

== Marketing ==
Paramount had originally prepared an advertising campaign that was "factual and rather somber and centred on the plight of prisoners of war", according to one report. However, after the marketing department saw the film they decided to create an entirely new campaign. The poster showed a moment invented for the campaign with a soldier (McGregor's son) being carried by another soldier (Sailor) with the copy line: "C'mon, buddy, we're going home." "We were looking to appeal to males on an emotional level", said Paramount's head of marketing, Gordon Weaver. "We were offering them an attainable fantasy. We'd all like to think that we can be heroes, that we would leave our jobs and families to do something really terrific for our friends."

== Reception ==
=== Box office ===
The film was a box-office hit, one of the top-earning films of 1983. This was considered a surprise at the time because of the film's lack of stars and the fact it had to compete with Scarface and Sudden Impact. Gordon Weaver, Paramount's president of marketing, thought the film "was successful because of the emotional impact of the ending. The emotional ending really makes you feel terrific."

Kotcheff said: "If we knew the secret of a film's success, we'd all be very wealthy. But I think it's partly the strong emotional tug of the father-son relationship."

=== Critical response ===
Critical reception of the film was mixed, with a 50% rating on Rotten Tomatoes based on reviews from 12 critics. Metacritic, which uses a weighted average, assigned the film a score of 38 out of 100, based on 5 critics, indicating "generally unfavorable" reviews.

Gene Siskel and Roger Ebert of This Week at the Movies: The Movie Review Program both gave the film a thumbs down. In his Chicago Sun-Times review of Uncommon Valor, Ebert gave the film a mixed 2-out-of-4 star review that described the squandering of "first-rate talent" like Kotcheff and Hackman in a film that was little more than "two hours of clichés" delivered with "lead-footed predictability".

It was one of a series of films about rescuing POWs in Vietnam that were entirely fictional.

== See also ==
- Joint POW/MIA Accounting Command
- Vietnam War POW/MIA issue
- National League of Families
- Operation Homecoming
