= Consenting Adult (film) =

1985 television film directed by Gilbert Cates

- Genre: Drama
- Based on: Consenting Adult by Laura Z. Hobson
- Written by: John McGreevey
- Directed by: Gilbert Cates
- Starring: Marlo Thomas; Martin Sheen; Barry Tubb
- Composer: Laurence Rosenthal
- Country of origin: United States
- Original language: English

Production
- Executive producer: Martin Starger
- Producers: Ray Aghayan; David Lawrence
- Production locations: Vancouver, British Columbia, Canada
- Cinematography: Frank Stanley
- Editor: Melvin Shapiro
- Running time: 100 minutes
- Production companies: The Starger Company; David Lawrence and Ray Aghayan Productions

Original release
- Network: ABC
- Release: February 4, 1985

Consenting Adult is a 1985 American drama television film directed by Gilbert Cates, from a teleplay by John McGreevey, based on the 1975 novel of the same name by Laura Z. Hobson. The film stars Marlo Thomas, Martin Sheen, and Barry Tubb and follows a teenage boy revealing to his parents that he is gay.

== Plot ==
Tess and Ken Lynd have been together for 26 years and share two children. Margie, the older child, is married to Nate and recently found out that she is pregnant. The younger child, Jeff, is off to college and heads the university's swim team. Jeff has had a strained relationship with his parents, especially his father, with whom he constantly argued over trivial matters. One day, Tess receives a letter from her son asking her to contact him. They meet in his university town, where Jeff tells her that he is homosexual. While Tess applauds his bravery, she has trouble processing the news, and the next day contacts her doctor, Mark Waldo, to inquire about any counseling possibilities to "show Jeff that he is mistaken." She contacts psychiatrist Dr. Daniels in Seattle, who shares her view that homosexuality is an illness. He tells her that 25% of his patients have returned to heterosexuality after sessions with him. Later, she informs Ken about their son's situation, and he bursts into tears.

During a session with the psychiatrist, Jeff reveals that he has been struggling with his sexual orientation for over seven years. Dissatisfied with the sessions, Jeff returns home to see his family, but Ken is not ready to see him and avoids him. Jeff goes to dinner with his mom to discuss his homosexuality. He tells her that he has tried being with girls but does not feel anything romantic, unlike what he feels about a guy on his swim team. Later that night, Tess blasts Ken for avoiding Jeff, but Ken tells her that he simply cannot agree with his son's lifestyle, criticizing liberalism and calling homosexuality "unnatural." Jeff starts to realize that his father does not want to see him and angrily leaves.

While on his way back to his college, he meets Hank, a man in a diner, who flirts with him. Hank offers him a drive, and Jeff nervously accepts. When Hank makes a move, Jeff initially refuses, but eventually gives in.

Jeff returns home for Christmas and tries to be romantic with his neighbor Sue, but quickly realizes that he has no interest in her. He then tells his parents that he has stopped treatment with Dr. Daniels, as he does not believe that his sexual orientation is a disease. During their confrontation, Jeff criticizes his parents for trying to remain in the closet and reveals that he has been sexually involved with men. Ken reaches his boiling point and cuts Jeff off financially.

Somewhat later, Jeff witnesses gay bashing in a diner and raises his voice to the offenders. Later he comes out of the closet to his roommate and best friend, Pete. Pete calls Jeff out for deceiving him and makes several homophobic remarks, prompting Jeff to move out and move in with his new boyfriend, Stu.

Suddenly, Ken dies from a stroke. After his funeral, Tess hands Jeff a letter written by his father in which he opens up about his struggle of trying to accept his son's homosexuality. He has written that he is not ready to embrace his lifestyle but does not intend to give up his son. Tess tells her friend Claire that she has accepted her son but does not want to share or witness his lifestyle. In the end, still struggling to cope, she calls her son and tells him she loves him.

== Cast ==
- Marlo Thomas as Tess Lynd
- Martin Sheen as Ken Lynd
- Barry Tubb as Jeff Lynd
- Talia Balsam as Margie
- Ben Piazza as Dr. Mark Waldo
- John Terlesky as Pete Roberts
- Corinne Camacho as Claire
- Matthew Laurance as Nate
- Joseph Adams as Stu
- Richard Sargent as Pat Malone
- Thomas Peacocke as Dr. Daniels
- Moira Walley-Beckett as Sue Wister
- Jeff Irvine as Hank

== Production ==
It took producer Ray Aghayan 10 years to get the film made: he first acquired the rights to the Laura Z. Hobson novel in 1975, and first intended on adapting it to a feature film, later on as a television film, but with no results. He picked up the project again in 1979 with David Lawrence. With the support of Martin Starger, the project was finally picked up by ABC in late 1983.

On her decision to take on the female lead, Marlo Thomas said: ""I thought [Tess] acted so much the way most mothers would act. She wanted to fix it. She got her kid through chicken pox and other problems and she'd fix this too. I was also struck by the broader implications of the film. It's also about unconditional love."

In an interview with the Los Angeles Times, Aghayan drew comparisons with another LGBT-related made-for-TV movie, That Certain Summer (1972): "At the end of That Certain Summer, the father cries and apologizes to the son. The son here really accepts his homosexuality and thinks it's terrific. There is an unguilty, positive attitude to this film."

== Reception ==
Tom Shales criticized the film for seeming "a bit dated", and wrote that the film instead could have been more daring by focusing on AIDS. In the reviewer's opinion, the problem lay with screenwriter John McGreevy having to not depict homosexuality too negatively for concerns of offending the gay community, all while not depicting it too positively either, for concerns of offending the "Bible Belt". He credited Barry Tubb with doing "his best to humanize a character who is largely a symbol", while calling Marlo Thomas a "formidable actress", yet criticized Martin Sheen for being "miscast".

John J. O'Connor of The New York Times wrote: "Consenting Adult is not the most impressive of ABC Theater presentations, but, courtesy of a thoughtful production and an exceptional cast, it is a film that commands attention. [..] John McGreevey's script is just a trifle too pat, touching on most of the cogent points but leaving no room for surprises. [..] The superb performances of Miss Thomas, Mr. Sheen and Mr. Tubb make this Starger Company Presentation, directed by Gilbert Cates and produced by Ray Aghayan and David Lawrence, the kind of small movie that is likely to have enormous reverberations."

== Awards and nominations ==
Year	Award	Category	Nominee	Result
1985	37th Primetime Emmy Awards	Outstanding Directing in a Limited Series or a Special	Gilbert Cates	Nominated
1986	43rd Golden Globe Awards	Best Actress in a Miniseries or Television Film	Marlo Thomas	Nominated
