= Faster (2010 film) =

2010 film by George Tillman, Jr

- Theatrical release poster
- Directed by: George Tillman Jr.
- Written by: Tony Gayton; Joe Gayton
- Produced by: Martin Shafer; Liz Glotzer; Tony Gayton; Robert Teitel
- Starring: Dwayne Johnson; Billy Bob Thornton; Oliver Jackson-Cohen; Mike Epps; Carla Gugino; Maggie Grace; Moon Bloodgood; Adewale Akinnuoye-Agbaje; Tom Berenger
- Cinematography: Michael Grady
- Edited by: Dirk Westervelt
- Music by: Clint Mansell
- Production companies: CBS Films; TriStar Pictures; Castle Rock Entertainment; State Street Pictures
- Distributed by: CBS Films Distribution (United States); Sony Pictures Releasing International (International)
- Release date: November 24, 2010
- Running time: 98 minutes
- Country: United States
- Language: English
- Budget: $24 million
- Box office: $35.6 million

Faster is a 2010 American action thriller film starring Dwayne Johnson, Billy Bob Thornton, Oliver Jackson-Cohen, Carla Gugino, Maggie Grace, Mike Epps, Moon Bloodgood, Adewale Akinnuoye-Agbaje, and Tom Berenger. The film was directed by George Tillman Jr. from a script by Tony and Joe Gayton. Faster was released on November 24, 2010, by CBS Films in the United States, and by Sony Pictures Releasing International in international markets. The film received mixed reviews from critics and grossed $35.6 million against a production budget of $24 million.

== Plot ==
On leaving prison Jimmy Cullen known only as "Driver" retrieves his 1970 Chevrolet Chevelle, a gun, and a list of names before heading to a telemarketing office in Bakersfield, California and killing a man named Prescott Ashton. He then visits Roy Grone, who gave him the list, and forces him to give him more names. Meanwhile, Cullen is tracked by detectives Cicero and one known only as "Cop" (Thorton); a hitman known as “Killer” is also hired to kill Cullen.

Cullen locates the second person on his list, Kenneth Tyson, who films his own personal snuff films. After finding and killing Tyson, Cullen gets into a gunfight with Killer in the hallway, but manages to escape. This affects Killer philosophically, and, after proposing marriage to his girlfriend, Lily, he begins to take the task personally. Humphries and Cicero investigate Cullen’s past and discover he was double-crossed during a robbery. Cicero remembers him from a video of his older half-brother Gary's death filmed by Tyson, which depicts an unidentified man shooting Cullen in the head; he narrowly survives, and has a metal plate surgically implanted in his skull.

Cullen visits his former girlfriend, Nan Porterman who knows he is killing those involved from the video of Gary's death. After revealing that she aborted their unborn child and has begun a new life by having a family, she wishes him well. At a strip club in Nevada, Cullen stabs bouncer Hovis Nixon for his role in Gary’s death, but he manages to survive. Soon, both Humphries and Killer get word that Nixon is in the hospital. Knowing Cullen will go back to finish him off, they converge there.

Cullen enters the hospital and kills Nixon while he is in surgery. Humphries unsuccessfully attempts to bring down Cullen, but is spared when the latter sees his badge. While driving away from the hospital, Cullen encounters Killer and they get into a high-speed chase on the freeway, culminating in Killer shooting Cullen in the neck.

Eventually Cullen comes to believe that his father arranged to have him and Gary killed after they refused to share the money they stole in a bank robbery. However, Cullen finds out that his father died years before, and realises that it was Gary’s girlfriend who sold them out. The last man on his list is a traveling evangelist named Alexander Jarod; after concluding his service, he is confronted by Cullen, but is spared after revealing that he has turned his life around and begging for forgiveness. Cullen is then confronted by Killer.

Cicero eventually learns the true identity of the man who shot Cullen, and she hurries to the church where Humphries is already on the scene. As Killer and Cullen confront each other, Humphries walks in and shoots Cullen in the head, revealing it was he who shot him in the past. He offers Killer the money for the job—one dollar—but Killer declines, telling Humphries to never contact him again.

Humphries calls his wife, Marina, who is revealed to have been his informant while she was still Gary's girlfriend. Suddenly, he is shot and killed by Cullen, who survived due to his metal plate. Cicero arrives on the scene after Cullen leaves, and she covers up Humphries’ involvement.

Cullen scatters Gary's ashes in the sea and drives off into the sunset, while Killer returns home to Lily; simultaneously, Jarod begins a sermon on forgiveness.

== Cast ==
- Dwayne Johnson as Jimmy Cullen / Driver, a small-time criminal who avenges his brother's death.
- Billy Bob Thornton as Detective Slade Humphries / Cop, a police detective.
- Carla Gugino as Detective Cicero, a police detective and Humphries' partner.
- Oliver Jackson-Cohen as Killer, a hit-man hired to kill Driver.
- Maggie Grace as Lily, Killer's girlfriend, who later on became his wife.
- Moon Bloodgood as Marina Humphries, Gary's ex-girlfriend and Cop's ex-wife.
- Adewale Akinnuoye-Agbaje as Alexander Jarod / Evangelist, a former criminal who is now a priest.
- Tom Berenger as The Warden
- Mike Epps as Roy Grone
- Xander Berkeley as Sergeant Mallory
- Courtney Gains as Prescott Ashton / Telemarketer
- John Cirigliano as Kenneth Tyson / Old Guy
- Lester Speight as Hovis Nixon / Baphomet
- Matt Gerald as Gary Cullen, Driver's late older half-brother.
- Annie Corley as Mrs. Cullen / Mother
- Jennifer Carpenter as Nan Porterman
- Michael Irby as Vaquero
- Aedin Mincks as Tommy Humphries, Cop's son.

== Production ==
Variety reported in May 2009 that Dwayne Johnson was in final negotiations for his role and that Phil Joanou would be directing. That September it was reported that Joanou had dropped out and George Tillman Jr. would direct. Salma Hayek was considered for the role of Cicero, but a week before filming was started she dropped out due to scheduling issues. Hayek was replaced by Carla Gugino. Principal photography began on February 8, 2010, in Los Angeles, California and continued in Pasadena and Santa Clarita in California.

=== Chevelle ===
The Chevrolet Chevelle driven by "Driver" which is prominently displayed in the movie has the rear of a 1971 or 1972 model, but the front of a 1970 model presumably due to the rarity and value of the 1970 Chevelle SS 454 which the car in the film is presumably portraying (it is never actually specified).

== Soundtrack ==
The soundtrack to Faster, featuring five songs and an original score composed by Clint Mansell, released through Lakeshore Records on November 23, 2010.

Additionally, another song used for the film is "En mi viejo San Juan" (Spanish for, "In my old San Juan") composed by Noel Epinanio Estrada Suárez and sung by Mexican singer and actor, Javier Solís.

== Box office ==
Faster grossed $23.2 million in the United States and Canada, and $12.3 million in other territories, for a worldwide total of $35.6 million.

The film grossed $12.2 million over its five-day Thanksgiving release weekend.

It was released on video on March 1, 2011, and it grossed $17.3 million in DVD and Blu-ray sales in the US.

== Reception ==
On the review aggregator website Rotten Tomatoes, 41% of 128 critics' reviews are positive, with an average rating of 4.9/10. The website's consensus reads: "It's good to see Dwayne Johnson back in full-throttle action mode, but Faster doesn't deliver enough of the high-octane thrills promised by its title." Metacritic, which uses a weighted average, assigned the film a score of 44 out of 100, based on 24 critics, indicating "mixed or average" reviews. Audiences polled by CinemaScore gave the film an average grade of "C+" on an A+ to F scale.

Roger Ebert for the Chicago Sun-Times said,

Rotate the plot, change the period, spruce up the dialogue, and this could have been a hard boiled 1940s noir. But it doesn't pause for fine touches and efficiently delivers action for an audience that likes one-course meals.

Kirk Honeycutt of The Hollywood Reporter said, "Faster is stripped for action without a moment wasted on unnecessary dialogue, exposition or nuances". Peter Bradshaw of The Guardian gave 1-star to the film and wrote "Director George Tillman Jr keeps revving it up, but this just gets tangled and boring." Duncan Bowles of Den of Geek wrote "Dwayne Johnson has finally returned to a grittier genre movie. Let’s just hope he gets to do more punching and driving in Fast Five and that Disney stays the hell away from him for the foreseeable future." Gabe Toro of IndieWire wrote "What few action sequences this film has are short violent bursts, mostly rendered in artless slow motion, a respectable choice to make if they were buoying a story with real dramatic heft, trying to foreground the mature questions of the film‘s premise and not hide them behind theatrics."

Stephen Holden of The New York Times wrote "Structurally “Faster” is as blocky as its star. Fancy camera angles and changes in hue cannot camouflage its stumbling, blunt-force narrative style, in which plot turns are dropped like bricks. When Driver confronts the last man on his death list, a blubbering tent-show evangelist and former criminal (Adewale Akinnuoye-Agbaje) who has turned his life around, the tone of “Faster” turns ludicrously histrionic. As the preacher grovels on his knees, clutching a Bible, babbling prayers and pleading with Driver not to kill him, our Superman thunders, “God can’t save you from me.”" Matt Goldberg of Collider wrote "Burdened by poorly-handled religious themes and an unnecessary supporting character, Faster isn't much fun but it does have Dwayne Johnson being a badass, and that's almost enough."

Tim Grierson of Screen International wrote "Despite the fact that Faster has all the sleekness of a car commercial, the filmmakers’ colourful visual palette helps ratchet up the urgency without succumbing to hyperbolic overkill." Russ Fischer of /Film wrote "When it dallies with a structure that doesn't match the concept and blows precious time on a character that doesn't belong, Faster goes screaming right off a cliff." Vic Hoffmann of Screen Rant wrote "Not quite to the extent of Unstoppable, Faster has the feel of a 1970s action film: For the most part it just drives in a straight line, with Johnson on a quest to find the next person involved in the death of his brother, killing them, getting back in his early 70s Chevy Chevelle SS with a Hurst shifter and AM radio, and going after the next person on the list. What takes away from the 70s feel, is the bloody shaky cam and some of the more "creative" camera angles - shooting up, from the floor towards Johnson and one of the bad guys fighting." Robert Koehler of Variety wrote "“Faster” is a movie distracted by itself, and struggles to find any particular tone or groove outside Driver’s man-on-a-mission single-mindedness [...] Johnson isn’t allowed to display his usually ingratiating charm, playing a pure vengeance machine with no outlets."
