= Operation Homecoming =

1973 return of American POWs from North Vietnam

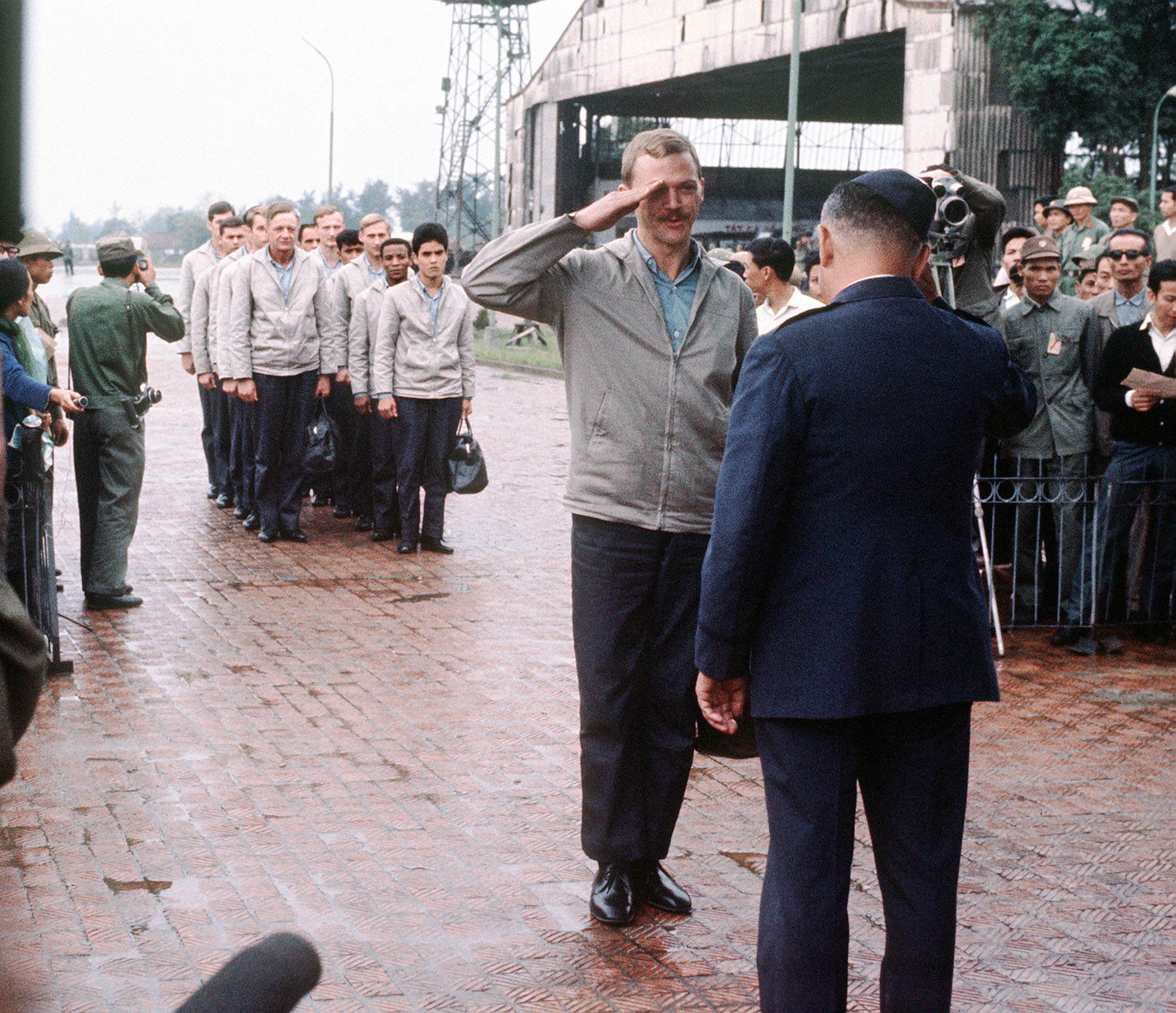
- US Army Captain John William Parsels, at Gia Lam Airport, was repatriated during Operation Homecoming.
Date	12 February 1973 – 4 April 1973
Location	South Vietnam, North Vietnam, and Clark Air Base
Result	Repatriation of 591 American POWs held by the North Vietnamese Army, Viet Cong, and allies

Belligerents
United States	North Vietnam; Viet Cong

Operation Homecoming was the return of 591 American prisoners of war (POWs) held by North Vietnam after the Paris Peace Accords, which ended United States involvement in the Vietnam War.

== Operation ==
On 27 January 1973, Henry Kissinger, then assistant to President Richard Nixon for national security affairs, agreed to a ceasefire with representatives of North Vietnam that provided for the withdrawal of American military forces from South Vietnam. The agreement also called for the release of nearly 600 American prisoners of war (POWs) held by North Vietnam and its allies within 60 days of the withdrawal of U.S. troops. The deal would come to be known as Operation Homecoming and was divided into three phases. The first phase required the initial reception of prisoners at three release sites: POWs held by the Viet Cong (VC) were to be flown by helicopter to Saigon, POWs held by the People's Army of Vietnam (PAVN) were released in Hanoi and the three POWs held in China were to be freed in Hong Kong. The former prisoners were to then be flown to Clark Air Base in the Philippines where they were to be processed at a reception center, debriefed, and receive a physical examination. The final phase was the relocation of the POWs to military hospitals.

On 12 February 1973, three C-141 transports flew to Hanoi, North Vietnam, and one C-9A aircraft was sent to Saigon, South Vietnam to pick up released prisoners of war. The first flight of 40 U.S. prisoners of war left Hanoi in a C-141A, which later became known as the "Hanoi Taxi" and is now in a museum.

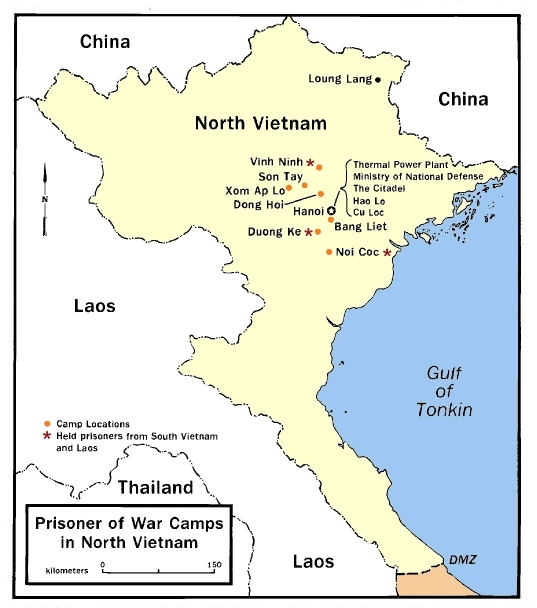
Locations of POW camps in North Vietnam

From 12 February to 4 April, there were 54 C-141 missions flying out of Hanoi, bringing the former POWs home. During the early part of Operation Homecoming, groups of POWs released were selected on the basis of longest length of time in prison. The first group had spent six to eight years as prisoners of war. The last POWs were turned over to allied hands on 29 March 1973 raising the total number of Americans returned to 591.

Of the POWs repatriated to the United States, a total of 325 of them served in the United States Air Force, a majority of which were bomber pilots shot down over North Vietnam or VC controlled territory. The remaining 266 consisted of 138 United States Naval personnel, 77 soldiers serving in the United States Army, 26 United States Marines and 25 civilian employees of American government agencies. A majority of the prisoners were held at camps in North Vietnam, however some POWs were held in at various locations throughout Southeast Asia. A total of 69 POWs were held in South Vietnam by the VC and would eventually leave the country aboard flights from Loc Ninh, while only nine POWs were released from Laos, as well as an additional three from China. The prisoners returned included future politicians Senator John McCain of Arizona, vice-presidential candidate James Stockdale, and Representative Sam Johnson of Texas.

John L. Borling, a former POW returned during Operation Homecoming, stated that once the POWs had been flown to Clark Air Base, hospitalized, and debriefed, many of the doctors and psychologists were amazed by the resiliency of the majority of the men. Some of the repatriated personnel, including John Borling and McCain, did not retire from the military but instead decided to further their careers in the armed forces.

== Kissinger Twenty ==
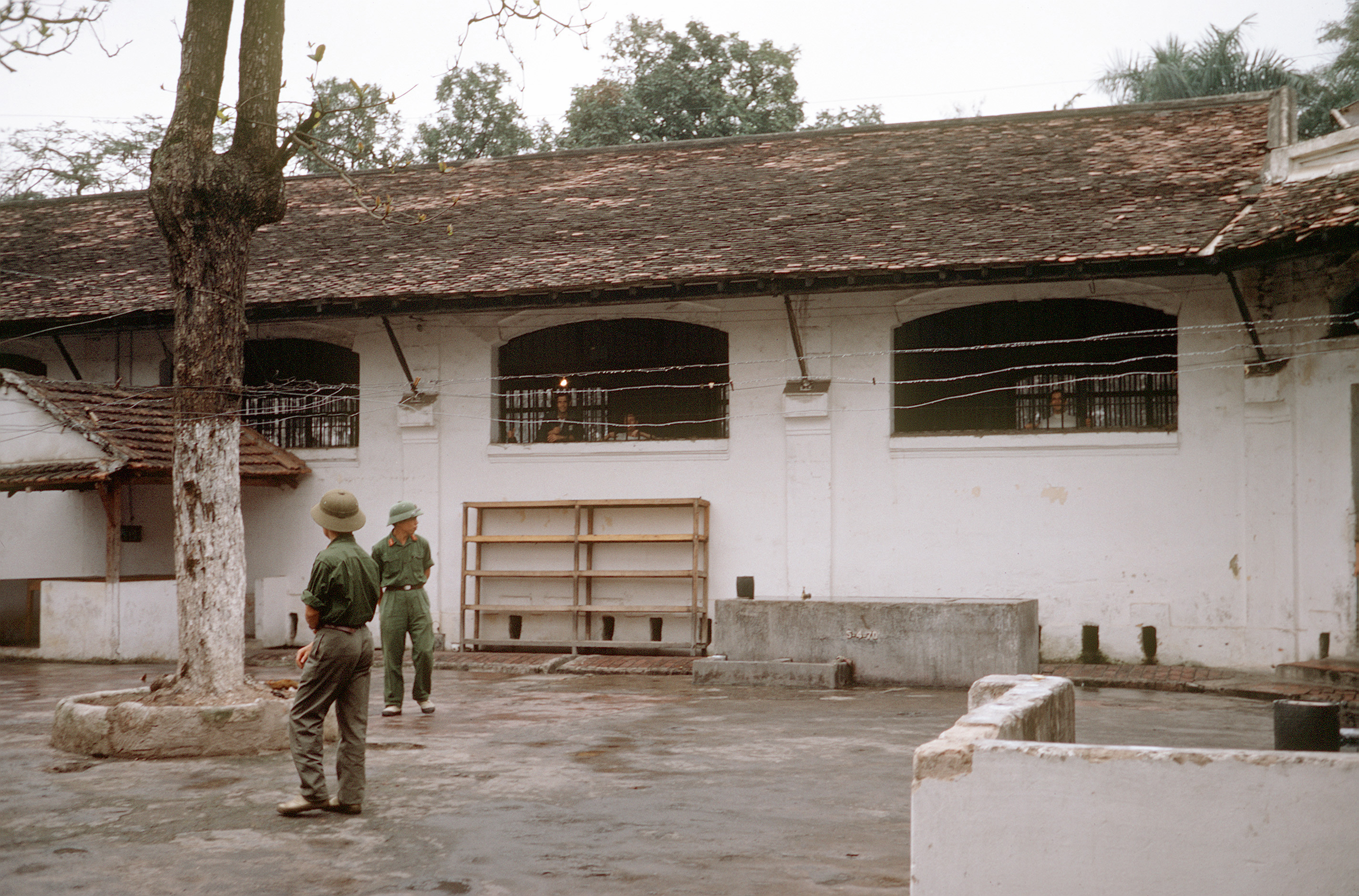
The Hoa Lo Prison, commonly referred to as the "Hanoi Hilton" by American POWs, in 1973

The culture of the POWs held at the infamous Hanoi Hilton prison was on full display with the story that would come to be known as the "Kissinger Twenty." One of the tenets of the agreed upon code between those held at the Hanoi Hilton stipulated that the POWs, unless seriously injured, would not accept an early release. The rule entailed that the prisoners would return home in the order that they were shot down and captured. The reason was that the communist government of North Vietnam could use the tactic as propaganda or as a reward for military intelligence.

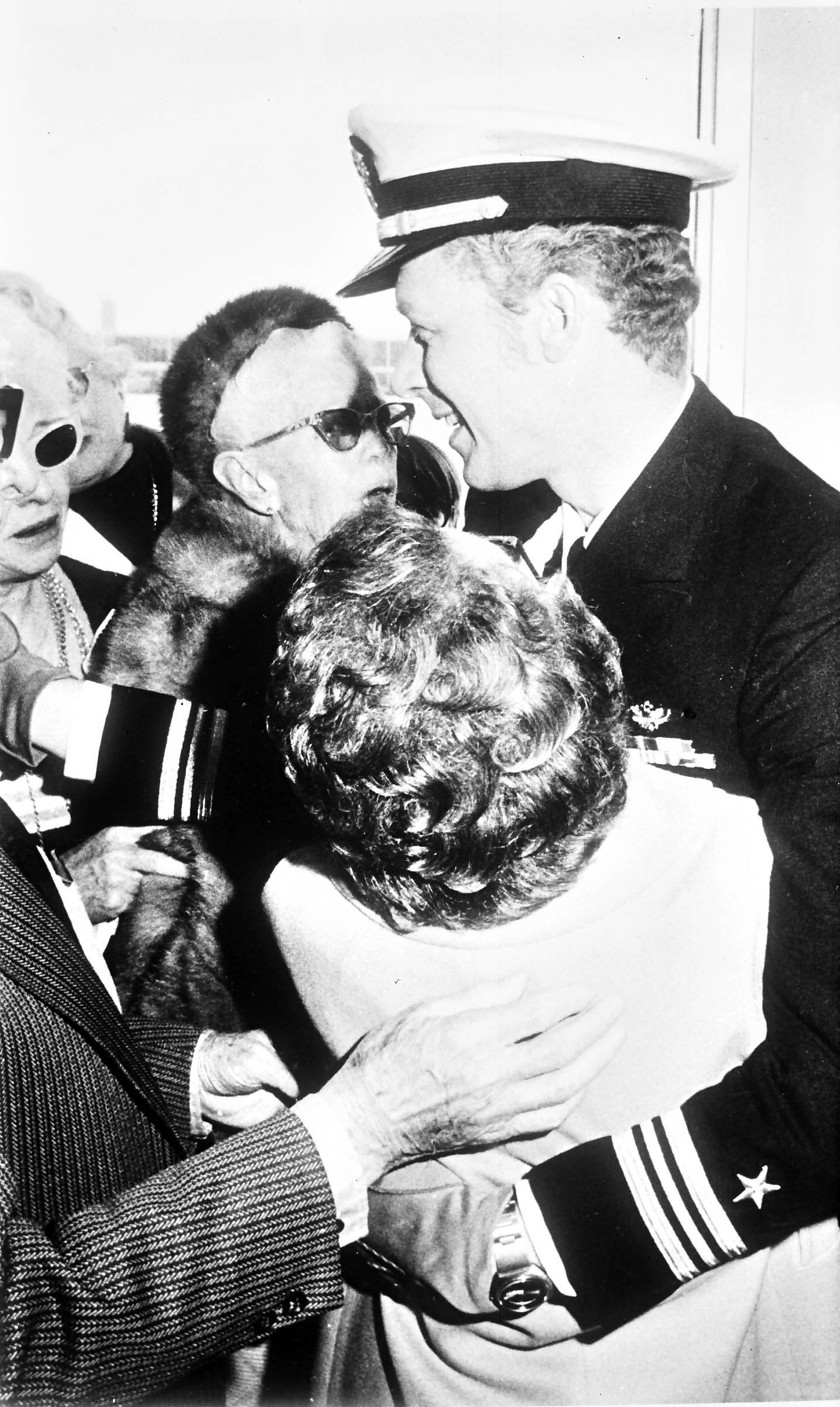
Navy pilot Phil Butler is welcomed home by his family after seven years and ten months as a POW in North Vietnam.

The first round of POWs to be released in February 1973 mostly included injured soldiers in need of medical attention. Following the first release, twenty prisoners were then moved to a different section of the prison, but the men knew something was wrong since several POWs with longer tenures were left in their original cells. After discussions, the twenty men agreed that they should not have been the next POWs released, as they estimated it should have taken another week and a half for most of their discharges, and came to the conclusion that their early release would likely be used for North Vietnamese propaganda. Consequently, in adherence with their code, the men did not accept release and so refused to follow instructions or put on their clothes. Finally, on the fifth day of the protest, Colonel Norm Gaddis, the senior American officer left at the Hanoi Hilton, went to the men's cell and gave them a direct order that they would cooperate. The men followed orders but with the stipulation that no photographs were to be taken of them.

It turned out that when Kissinger went to Hanoi after the first round of releases, the North Vietnamese gave him a list of the next 112 men scheduled to be sent home. They asked Kissinger to select twenty more men to be released early, as a sign of goodwill. Unaware of the code agreed upon by the POWs, Kissinger ignored their shot down dates and circled twenty names at random.

== Aftermath ==
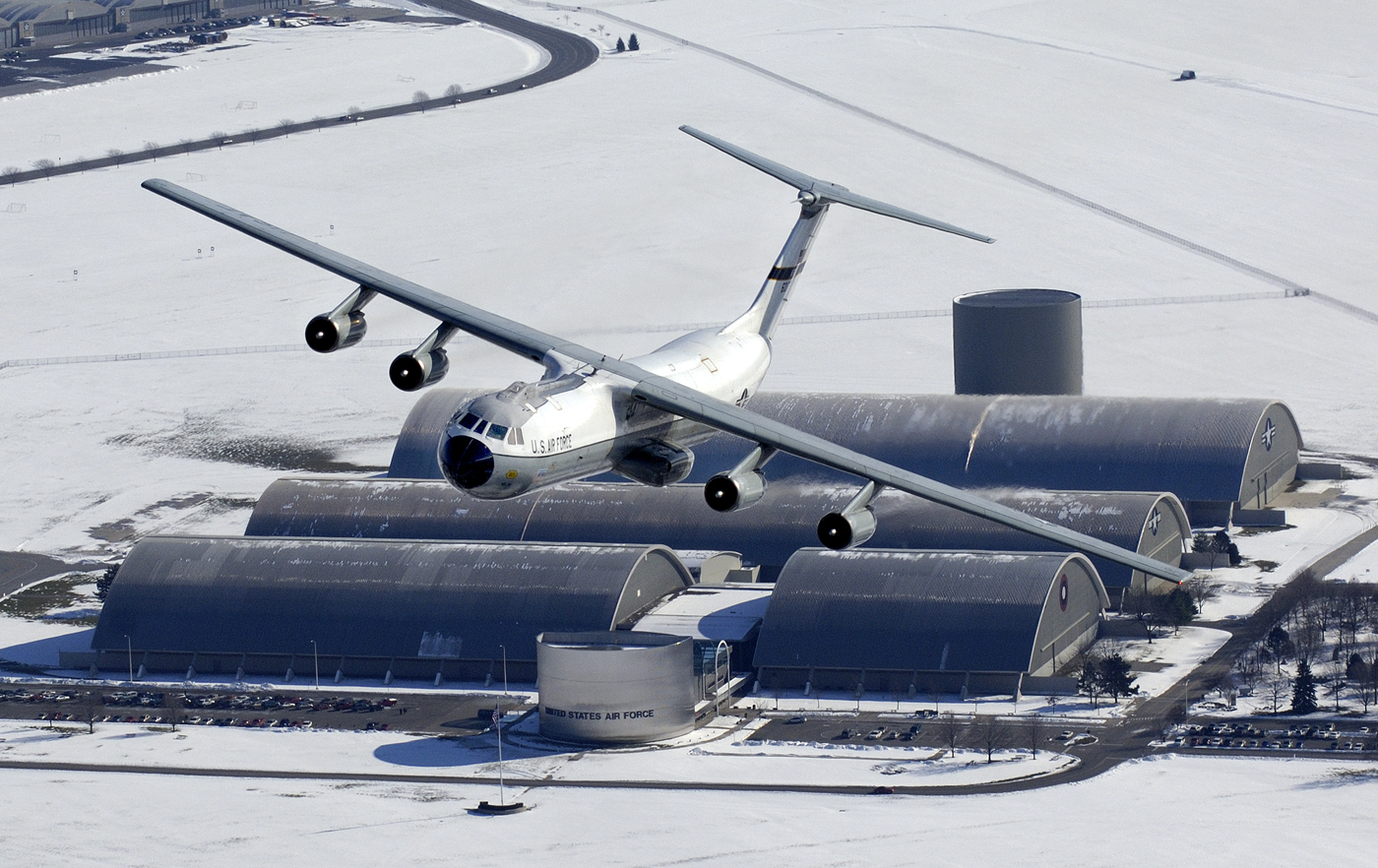
Hanoi Taxi, used in Operation Homecoming, flying over the National Museum of the United States Air Force in December 2005

Overall, Operation Homecoming did little to satisfy the American public's need for closure on the war in Vietnam. After the operation, the U.S. still listed about 1,350 Americans as prisoners of war or missing in action and sought the return of roughly 1,200 Americans reported killed in action and body not recovered. These missing personnel would become the subject of the Vietnam War POW/MIA issue for years to come. As of 26 July 2019, the Department of Defense's Defense POW/MIA Accounting Agency listed 1,587 Americans as missing in the war of which 1,009 were classified as further pursuit, 90 deferred and 488 non-recoverable.

In addition, the return of the nearly 600 POWs further polarized the sides of the American public and media. A large number of Americans viewed the recently-freed POWs as heroes of the nation returning home, reminiscent of the celebrations following World War II. No matter the opinion of the public, the media became infatuated with the men returned in Operation Homecoming, who were bombarded with questions concerning life in the VC and PAVN prison camps. Topics included a wide range of inquiries about sadistic guards, secret communication codes among the prisoners, testimonials of faith, and debates over celebrities and controversial figures.

The Army, Navy, Air Force, Marines, and the Department of State all had liaison officers dedicated to prepare for the return of American POWs well in advance of their actual return. The liaison officers worked behind the scenes and traveled around the United States to assure the returnees' well-being. They also were responsible for debriefing POWs to discern relevant intelligence about MIAs and to discern the existence of war crimes committed against them. Each POW was also assigned their own escort to act as a buffer between "past trauma and future shock."

However, access to the former prisoners was screened carefully, and most interviews and statements given by the men were remarkably similar, which led many journalists to believe that the American government and military had coached them beforehand. Izvestia, a Soviet newspaper, accused The Pentagon of brainwashing the men involved to use them as propaganda, and some Americans claimed that the POWs had collaborated with the communists or not done enough to resist pressure to divulge information under torture. The former prisoners were slowly reintroduced, and issued their back pay, and they attempted to catch up on social and cultural events that were now history. Many of the returned POWs struggled to become reintegrated with their families and the new American culture, as they had been held in captivity between one to almost ten years. The men had missed events including the assassinations of Martin Luther King Jr. and Robert F. Kennedy, the race riots of 1968, the political demonstrations and anti-war protests, Neil Armstrong and Buzz Aldrin walking on the Moon, and the release of The Godfather.

Despite their initial joy at regaining their freedom, some of the ex-POWs, suffering from PTSD and permanent injuries from their years of captivity, developed substance abuse and familial and marital problems upon their return and ended up divorcing their wives and becoming estranged from their families. The wife of Army Col. Floyd James Thompson, the longest held POW in US history, was living with another man at the time of his release. USAF Lt. Col. Robert Stirm, who with his family was the subject of the photo Burst of Joy, which won the Pulitzer Prize, had received a Dear John letter from his wife, who had been seeing other men and received marriage proposals from some of them just before his.

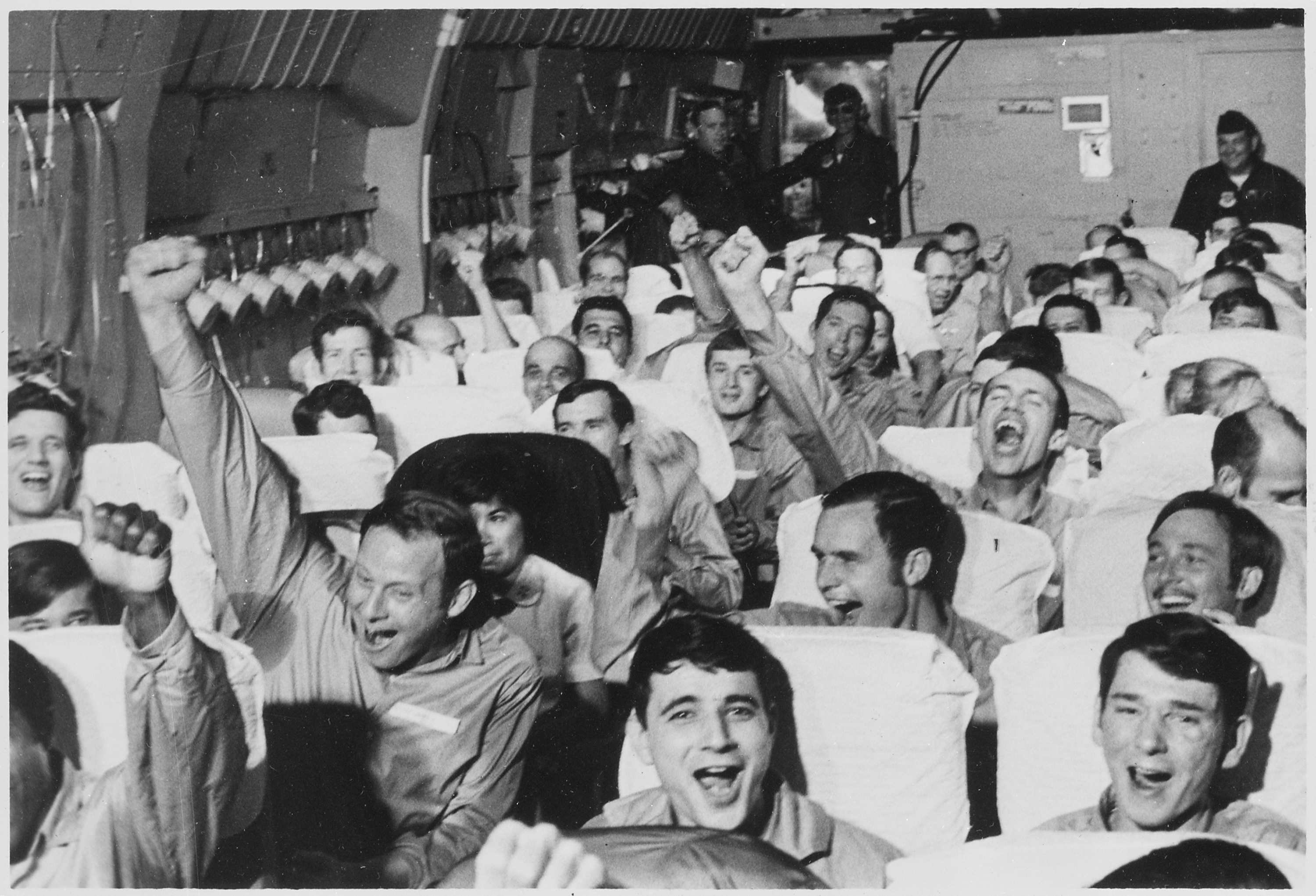
Former American POWs departing from Hanoi on March 28, 1973

The returning of POWs was often a mere footnote following most other wars in U.S. history, but those returned in Operation Homecoming provided the country with an event of drama and celebration. Operation Homecoming initially ignited a torrent of patriotism that had not been seen at any point during the Vietnam War. Overall, the POWs were warmly received, as if to atone for the collective American guilt for having ignored and protested the majority of soldiers, who had served in the conflict and already returned home. The joy brought by the repatriation of the 591 Americans did not last for long because of other major news stories and events. By May 1973, the Watergate scandal dominated the front page of most newspapers causing the American public's interest to wane in any story related to the war in Vietnam. Correspondingly, his administration began to focus on salvaging his presidency.

Many worried that Operation Homecoming hid the fact that people were still fighting and dying on the battlefields of Vietnam and caused the public to forget about the over 50,000 American lives that the war had cost. Veterans of the war had similar thoughts concerning the operation, with many stating that the ceasefire and the returning of prisoners had brought no ending or closure.

On 24 May 1973 President Nixon hosted the largest dinner in White House history, with more than 1300, for Vietnam POWs, and included actors: Bob Hope, John Wayne and Jimmy Stewart, and performers: Sammy Davis Jr., Irving Berlin and Vic Damone, broadcast live on ABC.

== Remembrance ==
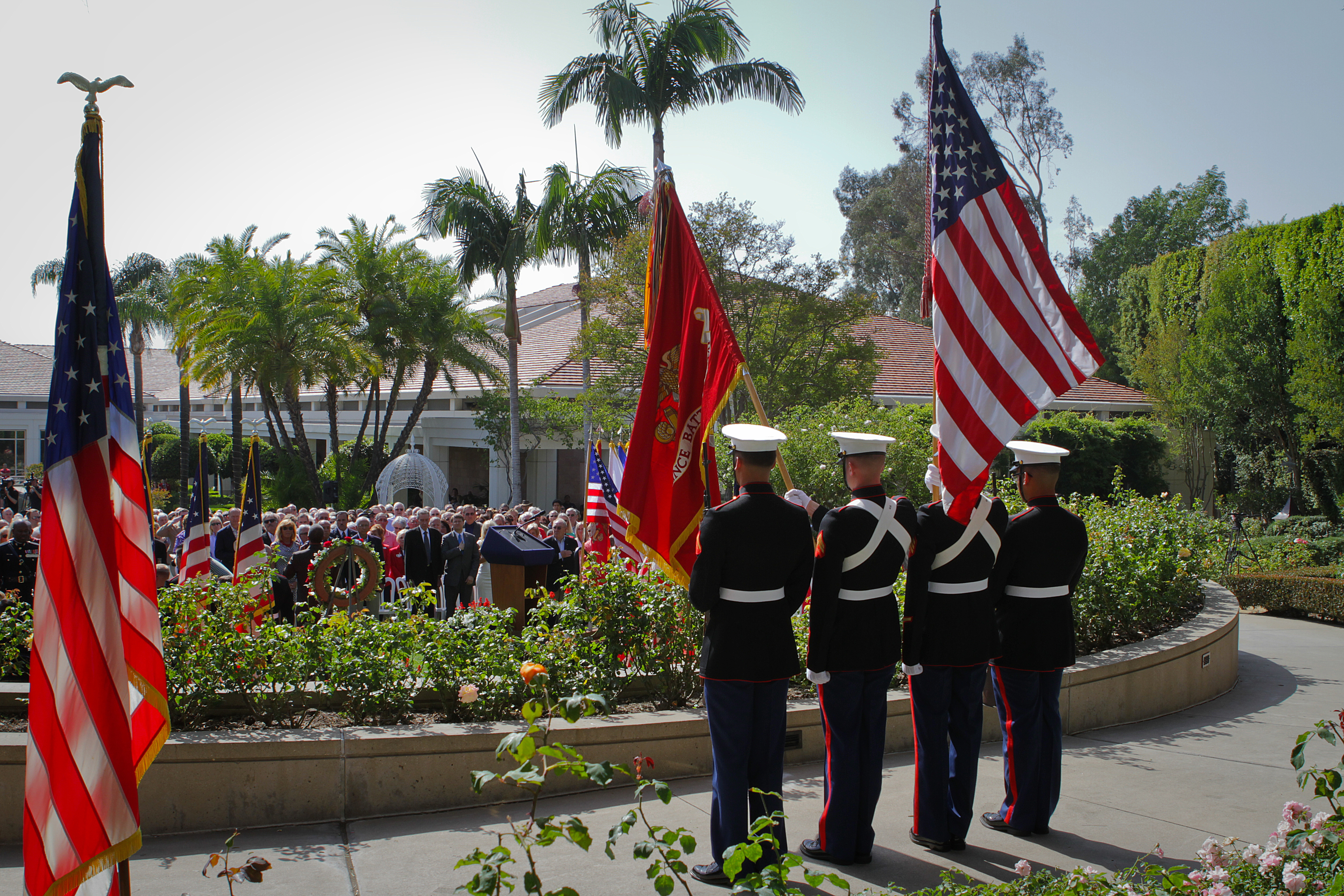
The 1st Marine Division honoring the 40th anniversary of Operation Homecoming

The plane used in the transportation of the first group of prisoners of war, a C-141 commonly known as the Hanoi Taxi (Air Force Serial Number 66-0177), has been altered several times since 12 February 1973, to include its conversion (fuselage extension) from a C-141A to a C-141B. Nevertheless, the aircraft has been maintained as a flying tribute to the POWs and MIAs of the Vietnam War and is now housed at the National Museum of the United States Air Force. The Hanoi Taxi was officially retired at Wright Patterson Air Force Base on 6 May 2006, just a year after it was used to evacuate the areas devastated by Hurricane Katrina.

Operation Homecoming has been largely forgotten by the American public, yet ceremonies commemorating the 40th anniversary were held at United States military bases and other locations throughout Asia and the United States.

Operation Homecoming's return of American POWs from Vietnam (aka "Egress Recap") was the subject of David O. Strickland's novel, "The First Man Off The Plane" (Penny-a-Page Press, 2012).
