= Joe Gayton =

American filmmaker

Joe Gayton (c. 1956/1957 – May 14, 2023) was an American writer, director and producer of film and television. He co-created the television series Hell on Wheels (2011–2016) and re-wrote Wings Hauser's original screenplay for Uncommon Valor (1983); He also wrote Bulletproof (1996) and Faster (2010).

== Personal life and death ==
Gayton was married to Jen Winter and had a stepdaughter. His brother is Tony Gayton. He graduated from Merritt Island High School in 1974.

He died on May 14, 2023, after a four-year battle with prostate cancer.

== Filmography ==
=== Film ===
Year	Title	Writer	Producer	Director
1983	Uncommon Valor	Yes	No	No
1989	Warm Summer Rain	Yes	No	Yes
1991	Shout	Yes	No	No
1994	Chasers	Uncredited	No	No
1994	The Cowboy Way	Uncredited	No	No
1995	Mind Ripper	No	No	Yes
1996	Bulletproof	Yes	No	No
1998	Sweet Jane	Yes	No	Yes
2008	The Shepherd: Border Patrol	Yes	Co-Producer	No
2010	Faster	Yes	Executive	No

=== Television ===
Year	Title	Writer	Producer	Director	Notes
2006	Southern Comfort	Yes	No	No	Television Film
2011-2016	Hell on Wheels	Yes	Executive	Yes	Co-Creator, executive consultant, directed episode "Purged Away with Blood".
2014	The Novice	Yes	Executive	No	Television Film

=== Unrealized projects ===
Title and Description	Ref.
Airtight, co-written with Tony Gayton, a caper pic set in contemporary Florida that would have been directed by Neil Burger.	
City of Darkness, co-written with Patrick Cirillo, Two young boys bring a comic-book villain and a comic-book hero into the real world.	
Con Game, An action heist script about four convicts who pull off a big heist with a perfect alibi	
The Dime, An adaptation of the Kathleen Kent novel of the same name that would have been produced by Matt Reeves	
The Englander, co-written with Patrick Cirillo, story is about a refined British detective who is hot on the trail of a murder case that leads him to turn-of-the century Texas.	
The Furthest Place, A script co-written with David Schow that would have been produced by James Cameron and directed by Rupert Wainwright.	
Gunmen, About a man who loses his wife in a shootout, decides to take matters into his own hands, and takes on the NRA Charlton Heston was slated to star.	
The Last Mission, co-written with Cade Courtley. The story centers on an ex-Navy SEAL commander whose daughter is taken hostage in the Philippines. When the U.S. government refuses to intervene, he summons his retired SEAL colleagues from Vietnam, now all in their late 50s and 60s, to come to her aid.	
Rogues, A project that Andrew Fleming was attached to direct	
Thicker Than Water, a comedy about two brothers in Las Vegas, that would have been produced by Jim Kouf and Lynn Bigelow	
Zero Hour, An adaption of the Joseph Finder novel of the same name	
