= Baghdad Texas =

- Theatrical release poster
- Directed by: David H. Hickey
- Written by: Shaneye Ferrell; David H. Hickey; Al No'Mani
- Produced by: Booka Michel
- Starring: Al No'Mani; Robert Prentiss; Melinda Renna; Barry Tubb; Ryan Boggus; Shaneye Ferrell
- Cinematography: Cory Van Dyke
- Edited by: Cory Van Dyke
- Music by: Booka Michel
- Production company: Loudhouse Productions
- Release dates: January 16, 2009 (Palm Springs International Film Festival); August 27, 2010 (United States)
- Countries: United States; Iraq
- Languages: English; Spanish; Arabic

Baghdad Texas is a comedy film directed by David H. Hickey and stars Al No'Mani, Robert Prentiss, Melinda Renna, Barry Tubb, Ryan Boggus and Shaneye Ferrell. The writers include Shaneye Ferrell, David H. Hickey and Al No'Mani. The movie was produced by Booka Michel. The film has had a number of festival screenings and had its official theatrical release at the Quad Cinema in New York City on August 27, 2010. It is the first notable American film to feature an Iraqi actor.

== Plot ==
Brando, an Iraqi dictator, ends up in a town near the US-Mexico border when his plane crashes. He is then escorted to Texas by illegal immigrants. His identity is then exposed when he is taken in by a Latino woman.

== Cast ==
- Al No'Mani as Brando
- Robert Prentiss as Randall
- Melinda Renna as Carmen
- Barry Tubb as Seth
- Ryan Boggus as Limon
- Shaneye Ferrell as Kathy

== Reviews ==
The New York Times said, "the premise had promise, but Baghdad Texas, a clumsy comedy directed by David H. Hickey, quickly disappoints with an inconsistent tone and painful overacting".

Slant Magazine said, "Although Baghdad Texas doesn't really work as a comedy, or as an allegory on border diplomacy and war, its imagination is both honest and authentic".
