= Grand Champion =

- Movie poster
- Directed by: Barry Tubb
- Written by: Barry Tubb
- Produced by: Amanda Micallef; Jay Michaelson; Lawren Sunderland
- Starring: Joey Lauren Adams; Emma Roberts; George Strait
- Distributed by: American Family Movies
- Release date: March 2002; August 27, 2004 (Theatrical)
- Running time: 97 minutes
- Country: United States
- Language: English
- Box office: $54,579 (US)

Grand Champion (also released as Buddy's World in Germany) is a 2002 family film, starring Jacob Fisher, George Strait, Emma Roberts, and Joey Lauren Adams. It was released theatrically in late August 2004.

It is about a young boy who wants his calf, "Hokey", to grow up to be the Grand Champion.

George Strait does the "Hokey Pokey" in it. Many other country stars appear in it, as well as major movie actors such as Bruce Willis and Julia Roberts.
