= Warm Summer Rain =

1989 film

- Directed by: Joe Gayton
- Written by: Joe Gayton
- Produced by: Cassian Elwes (executive producer); Frances Fleming (associate producer); Patricia Foulkrod (co-producer); Ed Rothkowitz (associate producer); Lionel Wigram (producer)
- Starring: Kelly Lynch; Barry Tubb
- Cinematography: Fernando Argüelles
- Edited by: Robin Katz; Ed Rothkowitz
- Music by: Roger Eno
- Release date: 1989
- Running time: 82 minutes
- Country: United States

Warm Summer Rain is a 1989 drama film written and directed by Joe Gayton, starring Kelly Lynch and Barry Tubb.

== Synopsis ==
Kate, a depressed thirty-something, unsuccessfully attempts suicide by slitting her wrists. Reflecting briefly upon her circumstances in the hospital, she realizes that nothing has been solved. Whereupon, she vacates the premises, wearing nothing but a hospital gown, a black coat, and flimsy sandals. Shortly thereafter, at a bus station, she requests from the attendant a bus ticket to wherever, considering the limited funds she has to spare. The attendant insists on a destination, or even a direction. Kate spins around, points, and says, "that way."

She then gets off the bus in the middle of nowhere. After turning down a ride from a handsome stranger in a Mustang convertible, she walks through the desert and finds an isolated bar. Getting drunk at the bar, she parties with some people. The stranger who tried to pick her up along the road comes in, and eventually, she passes out. She wakes up the next morning in an abandoned house, with the stranger, wearing a ring. He tells her that they were married in the bar and shows her some Polaroid photos of the "ceremony."

Hiding out in an abandoned house in the desert, the pair embarks on a torrid journey of sensual and romantic discovery that rekindles her will to live. However, it soon becomes clear that things can't stay this way forever.

== Cast ==
- Kelly Lynch as Kate
- Barry Tubb as Handsome Stranger
- Ron Sloan as Andy
- Larry Poindexter as Steve

== Production ==
The movie, directed by Joe Gayton, marks his first foray into feature direction. Filming began on September 12, 1988, and wrapped up on March 1, 1989, with a theatrical release in April of the same year. It features a significant amount of nudity, explicit sexual scenes, and highly profane language.
