= Barry Tubb =

American actor and director (born 1963)

- Born: Barry York Tubb; February 13, 1963 (age 63); Snyder, Texas, United States
- Occupations: Actor, writer
- Years active: 1983–2014
- Notable work: Top Gun; Bay City Blues; Hill Street Blues; The Legend of Billie Jean; Lonesome Dove; The Three Burials of Melquiades Estrada

Barry York Tubb (born February 13, 1963) is an American actor and director. He has worked in both television and film between 1983 and 2014.

== Early life ==
Tubb was born in Snyder, Texas, in 1963. He won the state bull-riding championship at age 15 (junior division). After graduating from Snyder High School in 1981, he began stage training in San Francisco. Tubb moved to Hollywood in the mid '80s to begin his screen- and television-acting career.

== Career ==
He earned a regular role on the short-lived baseball ensemble series Bay City Blues and later a recurring role as a rookie police officer on Hill Street Blues. He played a shy homosexual college student who comes out to his parents in Consenting Adult, and a wealthy corporate upstart involved in murder in Billionaire Boys Club. Barry's most popular television role was that of Jasper Fant in the epic Westerns Lonesome Dove and its sequel Return to Lonesome Dove in 1993, which were partly set in his native Texas.

Moving on to film, Barry accepted supporting roles in Mask, The Legend of Billie Jean, and as Wolfman in Top Gun. In 1988, he co-starred with Mary Tyler Moore and Lynn Redgrave in the Broadway production of Sweet Sue, in which he appeared nude, and which had a run of 164 performances. The following year, he appeared in the drama Warm Summer Rain opposite Kelly Lynch. Barry turned to independent filming and other interests outside of Hollywood. In 1991, he moved to France and rode in a Wild West show. Barry starred, directed, produced, and co-wrote the Cowboys and Indians low-budget thriller Blood Trail which led to no major offers for distribution.

In 2002, Tubb directed the family film Grand Champion about the exploits a young boy who raises a prize-winning steer and struggles to save it from the slaughterhouse. He shot the film in his own hometown of Snyder, Texas.

Tubb has participated in gatherings of the American Cowboy Culture Association, which holds the annual National Cowboy Symposium and Celebration each September in Lubbock, Texas.

In 2024, Tubb sued Paramount Pictures for the use of his face in the film Top Gun: Maverick without his permission.

== Filmography ==
Year	Title	Role	Notes
1983	Christine	Football Player	Uncredited
1983	Bay City Blues	Mickey Wagner	6 episodes
1984	Hill Street Blues	Officer Archie Pizer	4 episodes
1985	Consenting Adult	Jeff Lynd	TV movie
1985	Mask	Dewey	
1985	The Legend of Billie Jean	Hubie Pyatt	
1986	Top Gun	Wolfman	
1986	American Playhouse		Episode: "The Wide Net"
1987	Billionaire Boys Club	Todd Melbourne	2 episodes
1989	Warm Summer Rain	Guy	
1989	Lonesome Dove	Jasper Fant	
1989	Valentino Returns	Wayne Gibbs	
1990	Without Her Consent	Trey Cousins	TV movie
1991	Guilty by Suspicion	Jerry Cooper	
1993	Return to Lonesome Dove	Jasper Fant	4 episodes
1997	Blood Trail		Film Director, Writer, Film Producer
1999	The Big Day	Tuff	
2001	American Outlaws	Captain Malcolm	
2002	Grand Champion	Dr. Alfred / Jesse James Davis	Film Director, Writer, Film Producer
2004	Danger Zone: The Making of 'Top Gun'	Himself	
2005	Blood Trail	Need Hawks	
2005	Truce	AD	
2005	The Three Burials of Melquiades Estrada	A.L.	
2008	Clown Hunt	Gene	
2009	Baghdad Texas	Seth	
2009	Temple Grandin	Randy	TV movie
2009–2011	Friday Night Lights	Tom Cafferty	
2010	Dance with the One	Roy	
2011	The Legend of Hell's Gate: An American Conspiracy	Sheriff Michaels	
2011	Javelina	Tex	
2013	Dear Sidewalk	Jim	
2013–2014	Revolution	Malcolm Dove	4 episodes
2014	Two Step	Horace	
2014	Deliverance Creek	Jeb Crawford	TV movie
