= 1992 Ross Perot vice presidential candidate selection =

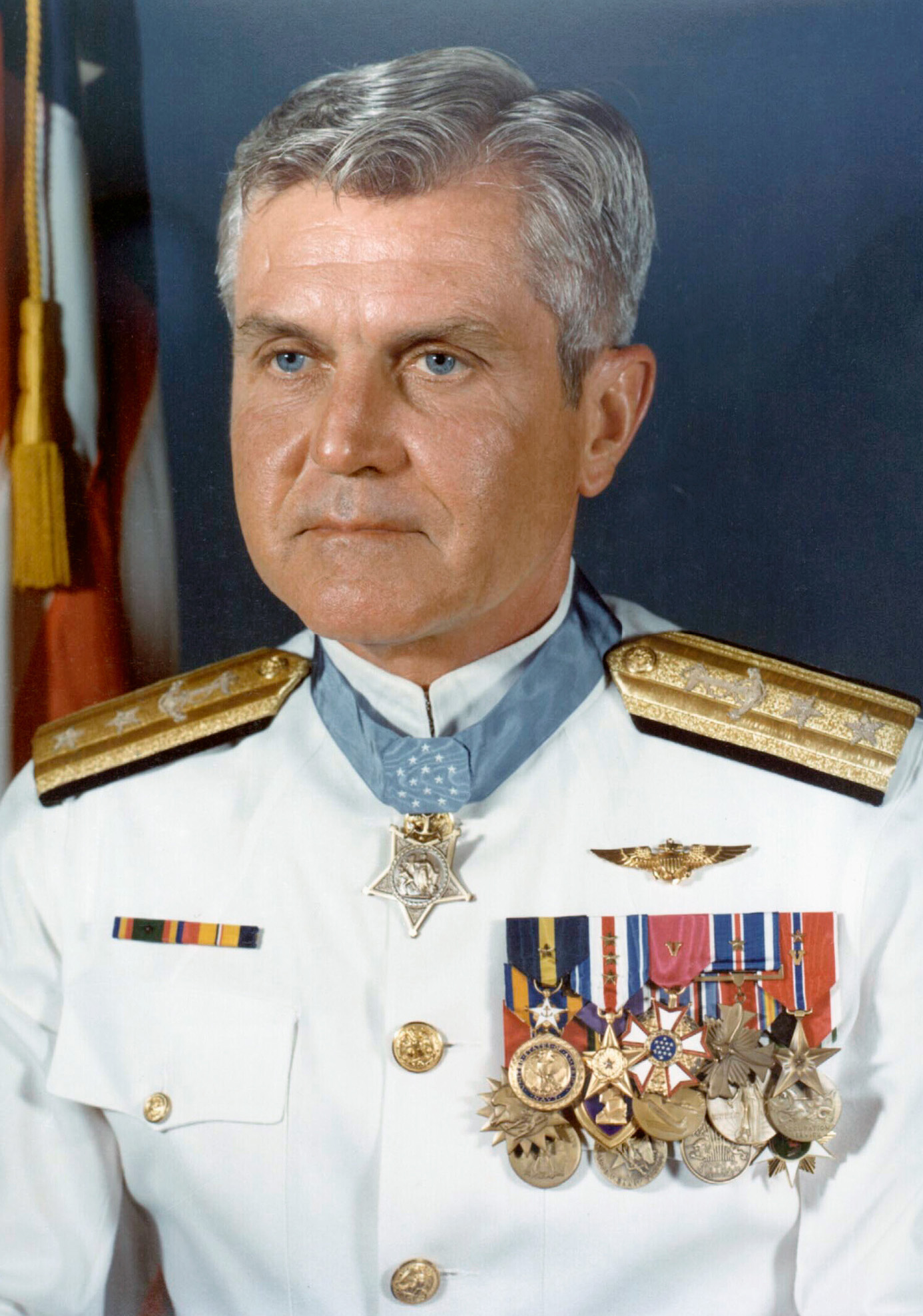
Independent candidate Ross Perot chose retired Vice Admiral James Stockdale as his running mate in 1992.

This article lists running mates considered by Ross Perot during his 1992 independent candidacy for President of the United States. On March 30, 1992, Perot announced that retired vice admiral James Stockdale would serve as his "interim" running mate, so that Perot could qualify for the ballot in several states. At the time, Perot planned to pick a permanent running mate during the summer, around the time of the 1992 Democratic National Convention and the 1992 Republican National Convention. Perot suspended his campaign during the summer of 1992, possibly preventing him from choosing a different running mate. After he decided to run again, Perot decided to keep Stockdale as his running mate. John Silber, the president of Boston University, was also rumored as a potential running mate for Perot. Stockdale appeared at the 1992 vice presidential debate. The Perot–Stockdale ticket took 18.9% of the popular vote, but the Clinton–Gore ticket won the election.

== Media speculation of vice presidential candidates ==
=== Federal executive branch officials ===
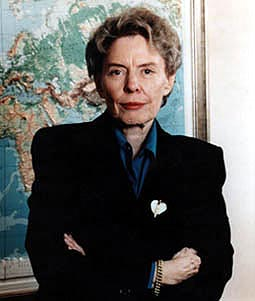
Former UN Ambassador
Jeane Kirkpatrick
from Maryland
(1981–1985)

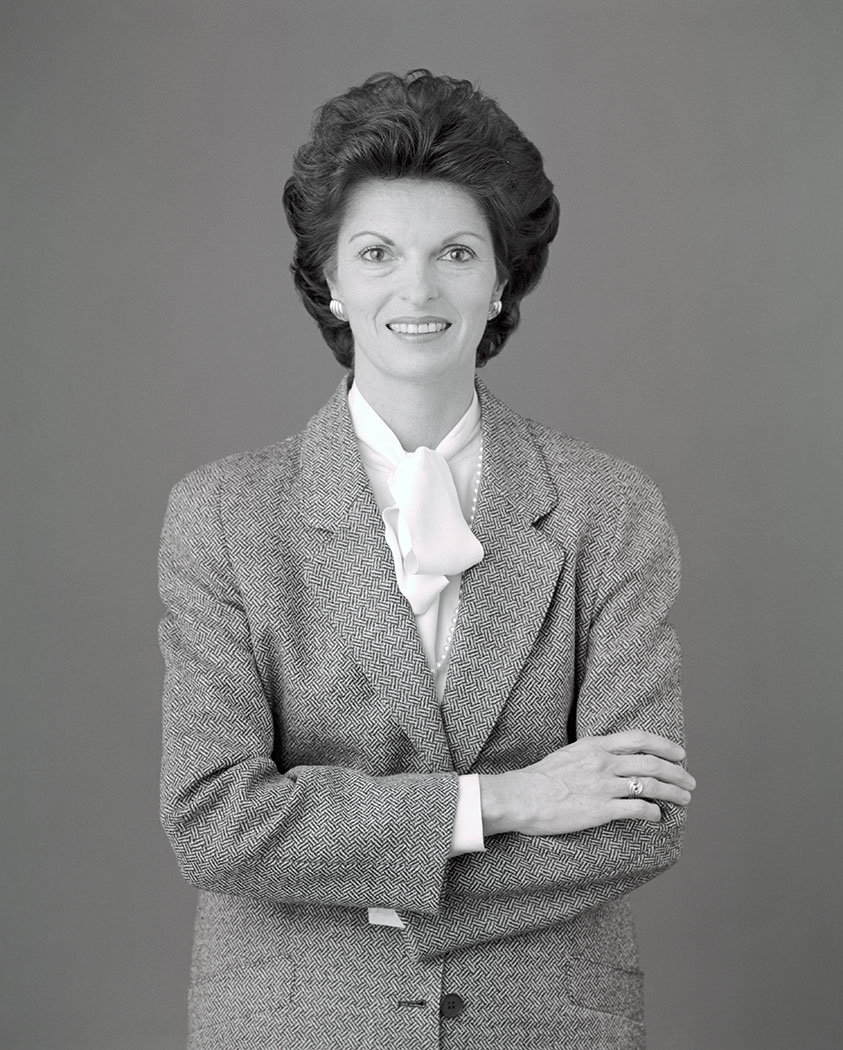
Former Secretary of Labor
Ann McLaughlin
from District of Columbia
(1987–1989)

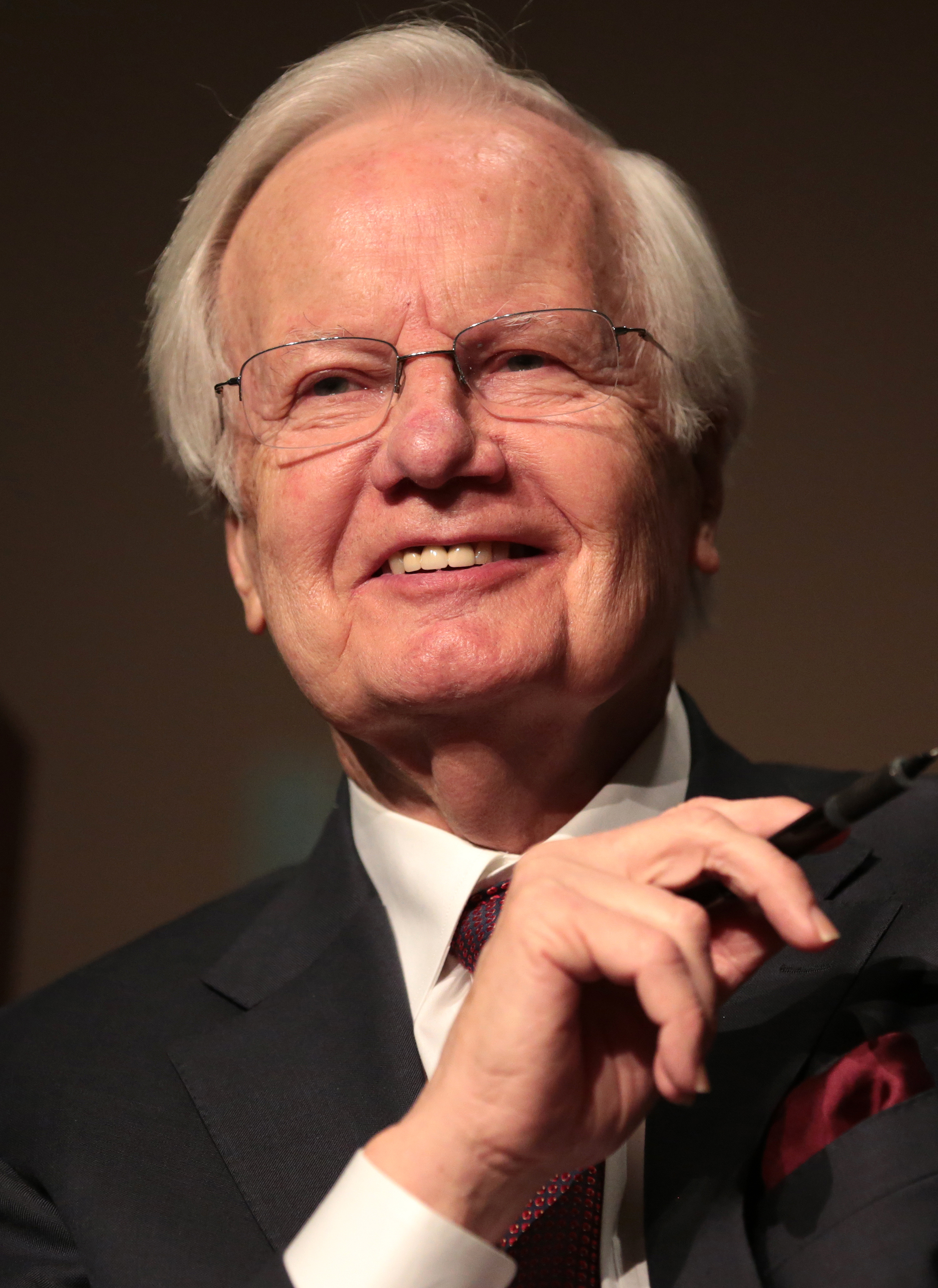
Former Press Secretary
Bill Moyers
from New York
(1965–1967)

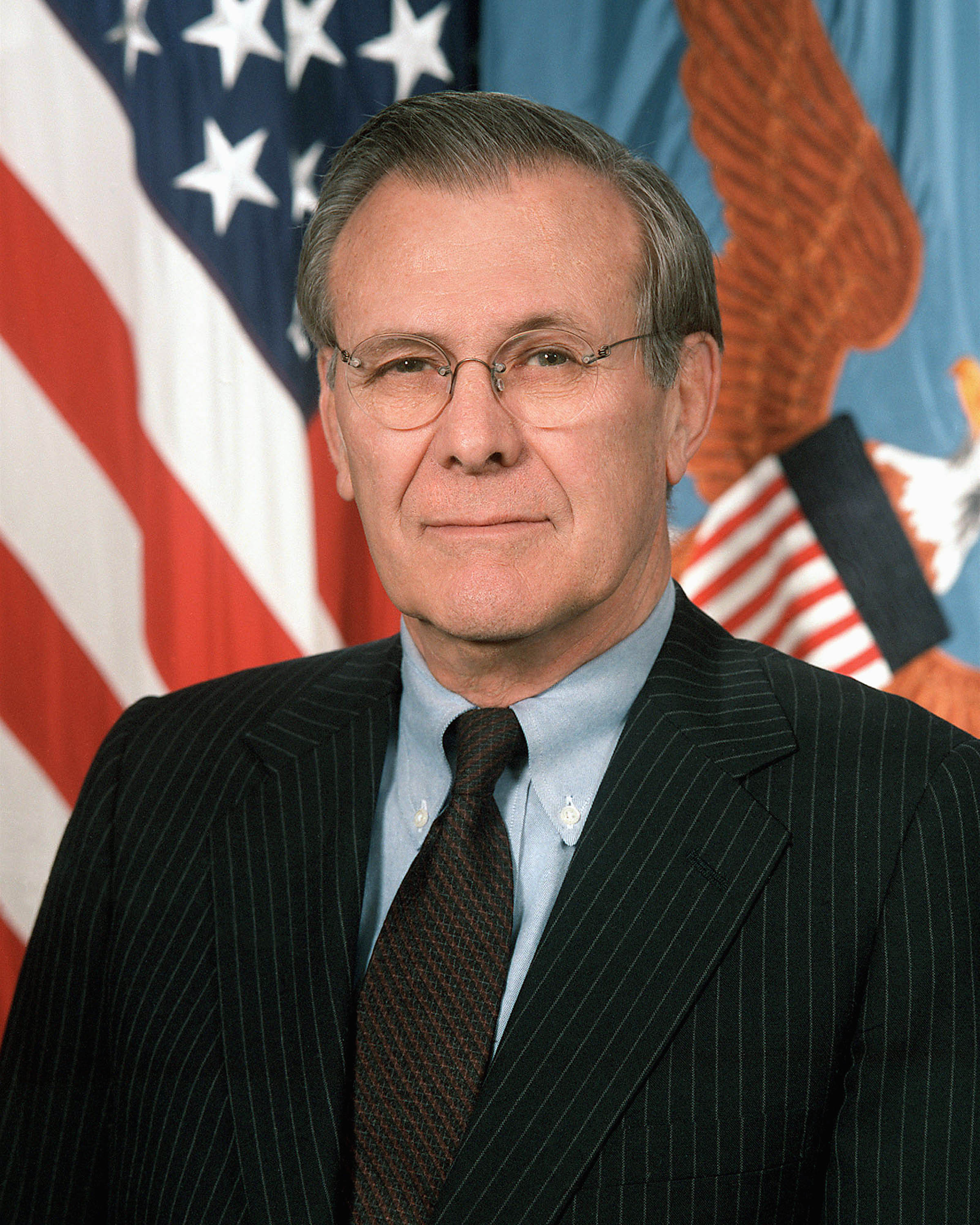
Former Secretary of Defense
Donald Rumsfeld
from Illinois
(1975–1977)

=== Members of Congress ===
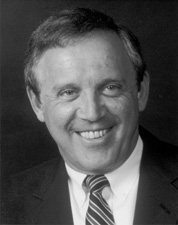
Senator
Warren Rudman
from New Hampshire
(1980–1993)

=== Governors ===
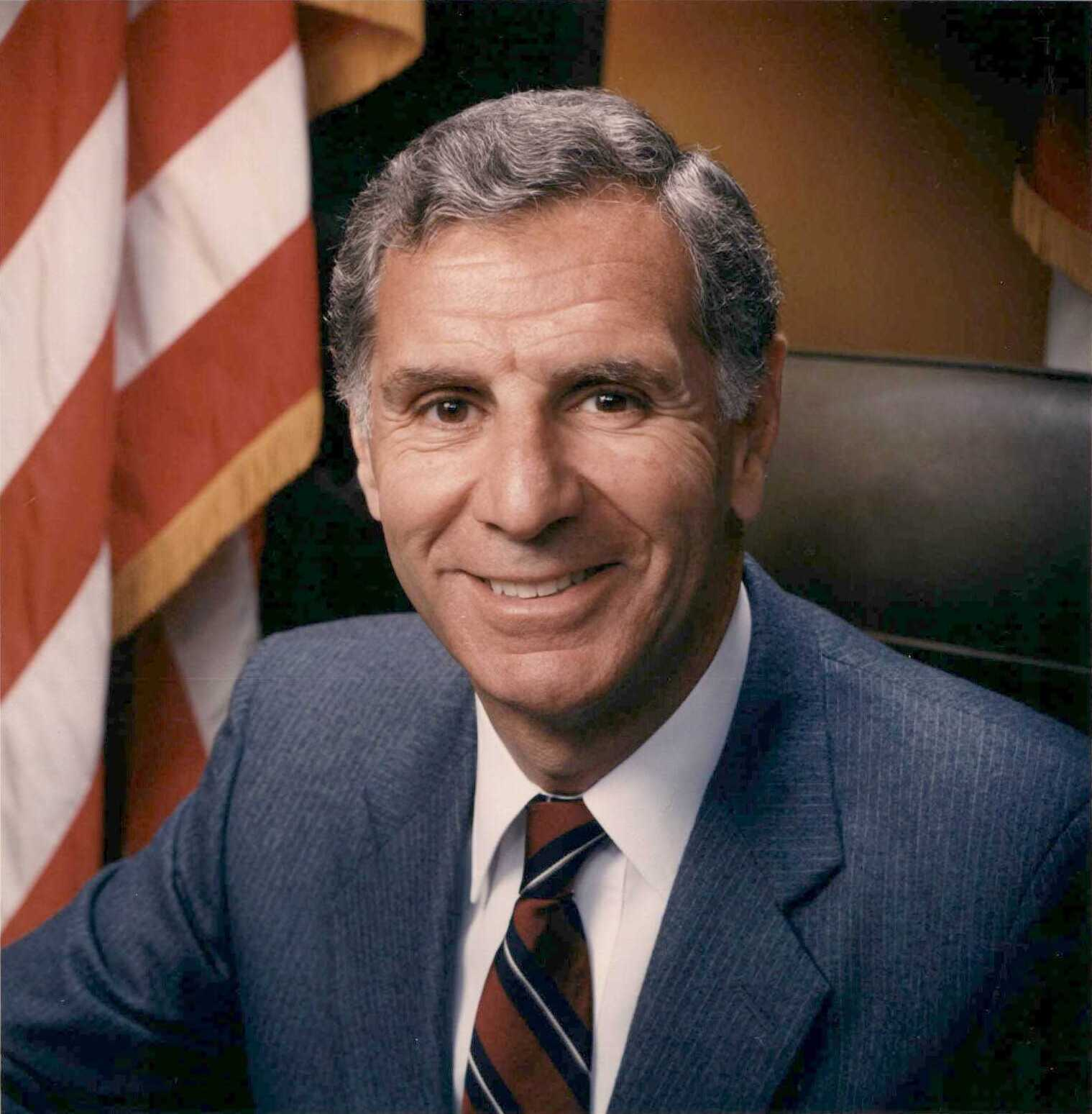
Former governor
George Deukmejian
of California
(1983–1991)

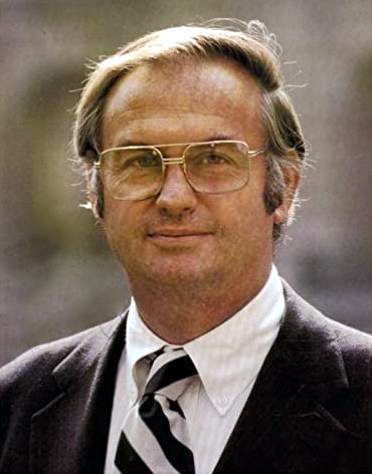
Governor
Lowell Weicker
of Connecticut
(1991–1995)

=== Other individuals ===
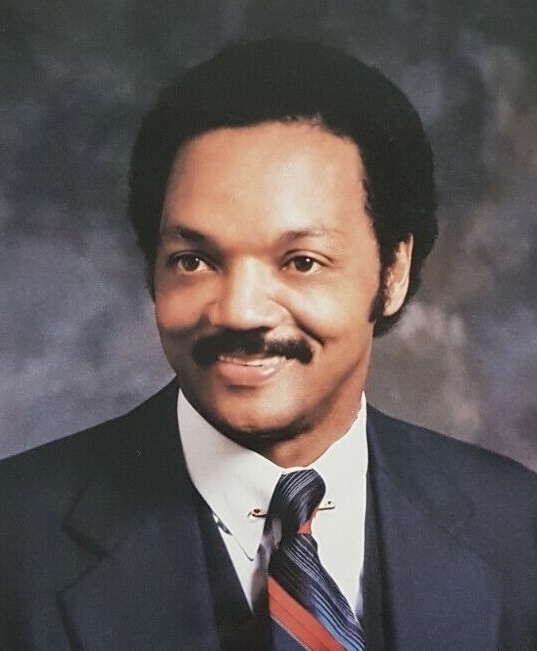
Reverend
Jesse Jackson
from District of Columbia

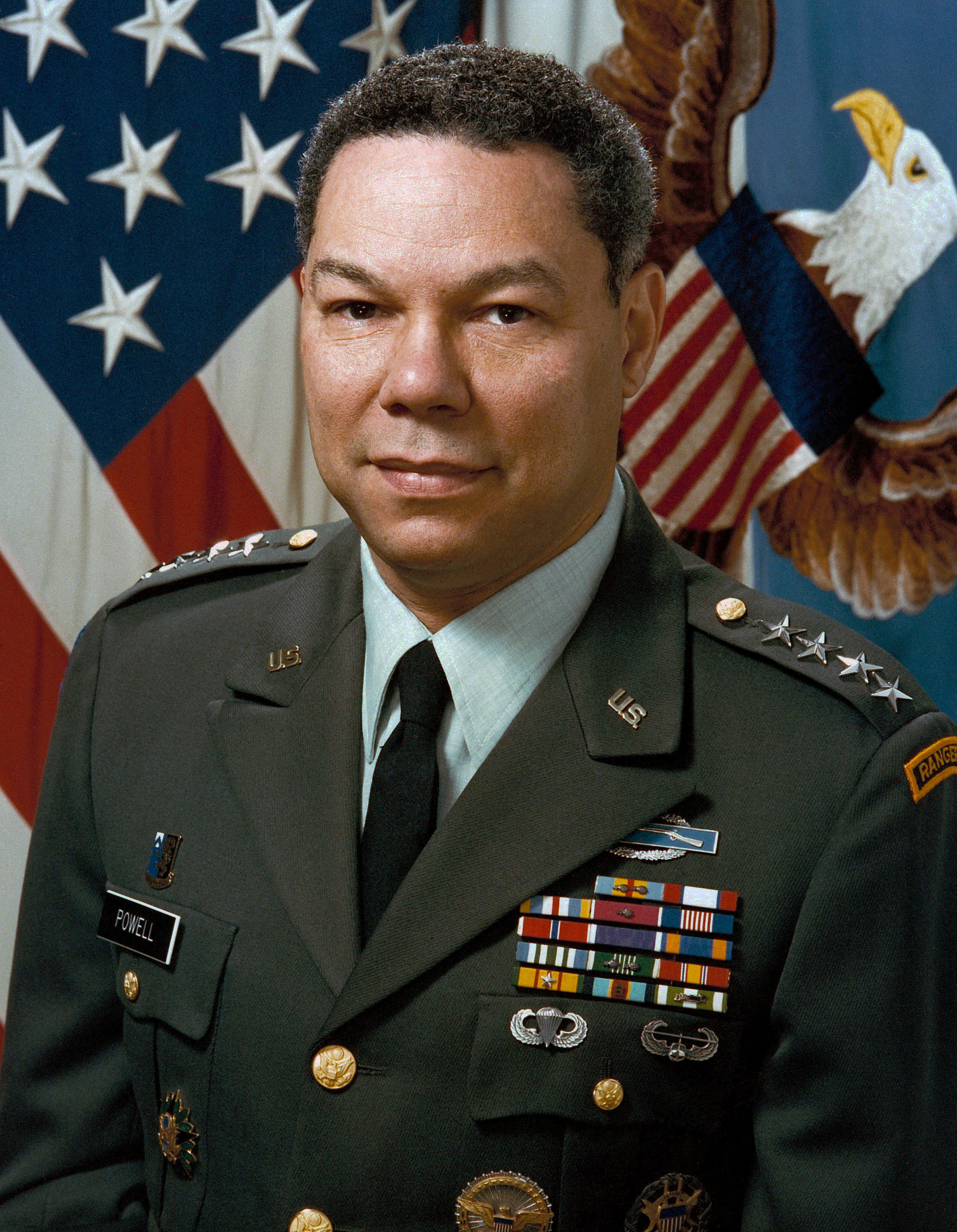
Former chairman of the Joint Chiefs of Staff
Colin Powell
from New York
(1989–1993)

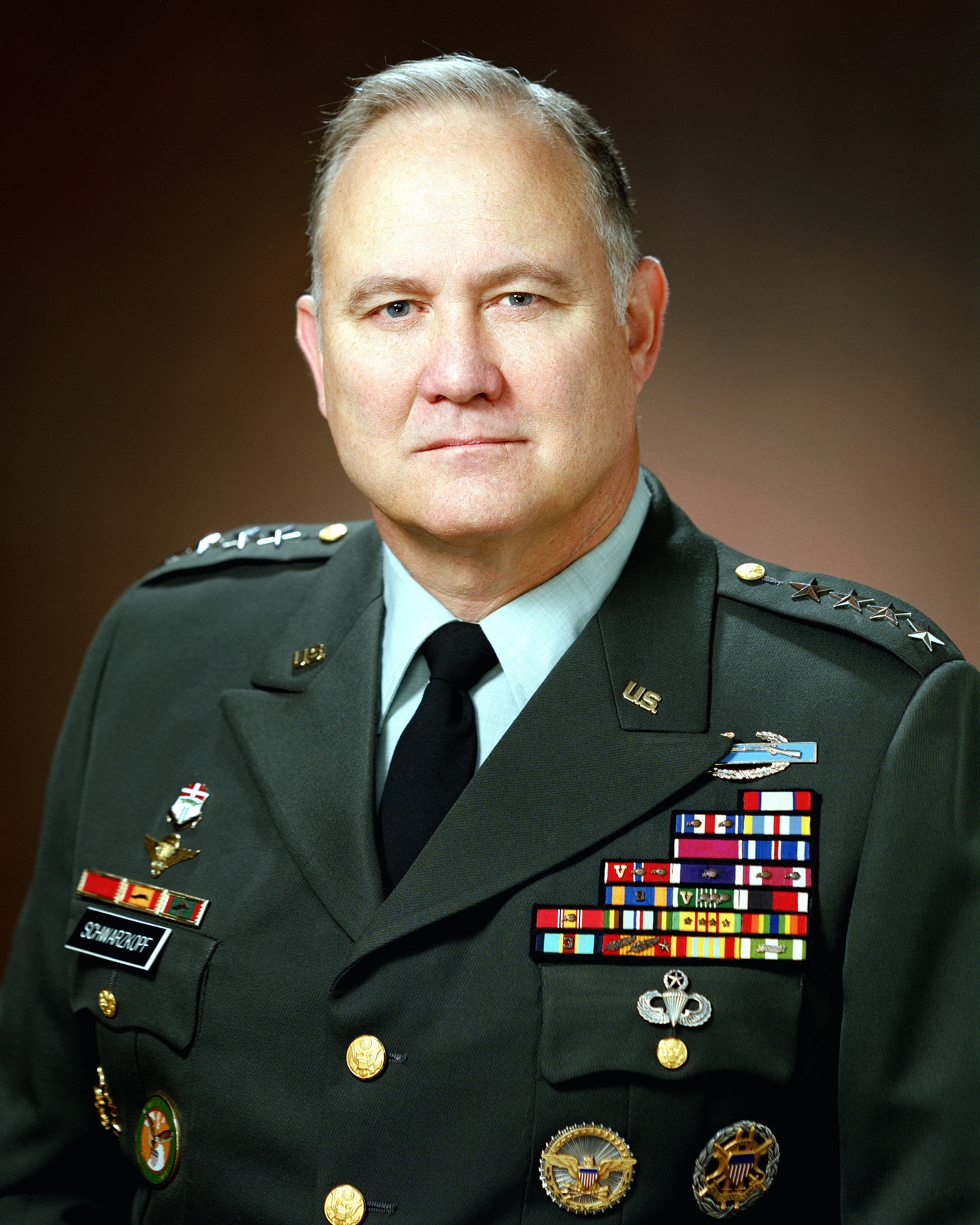
General
Norman Schwarzkopf Jr.
from Florida

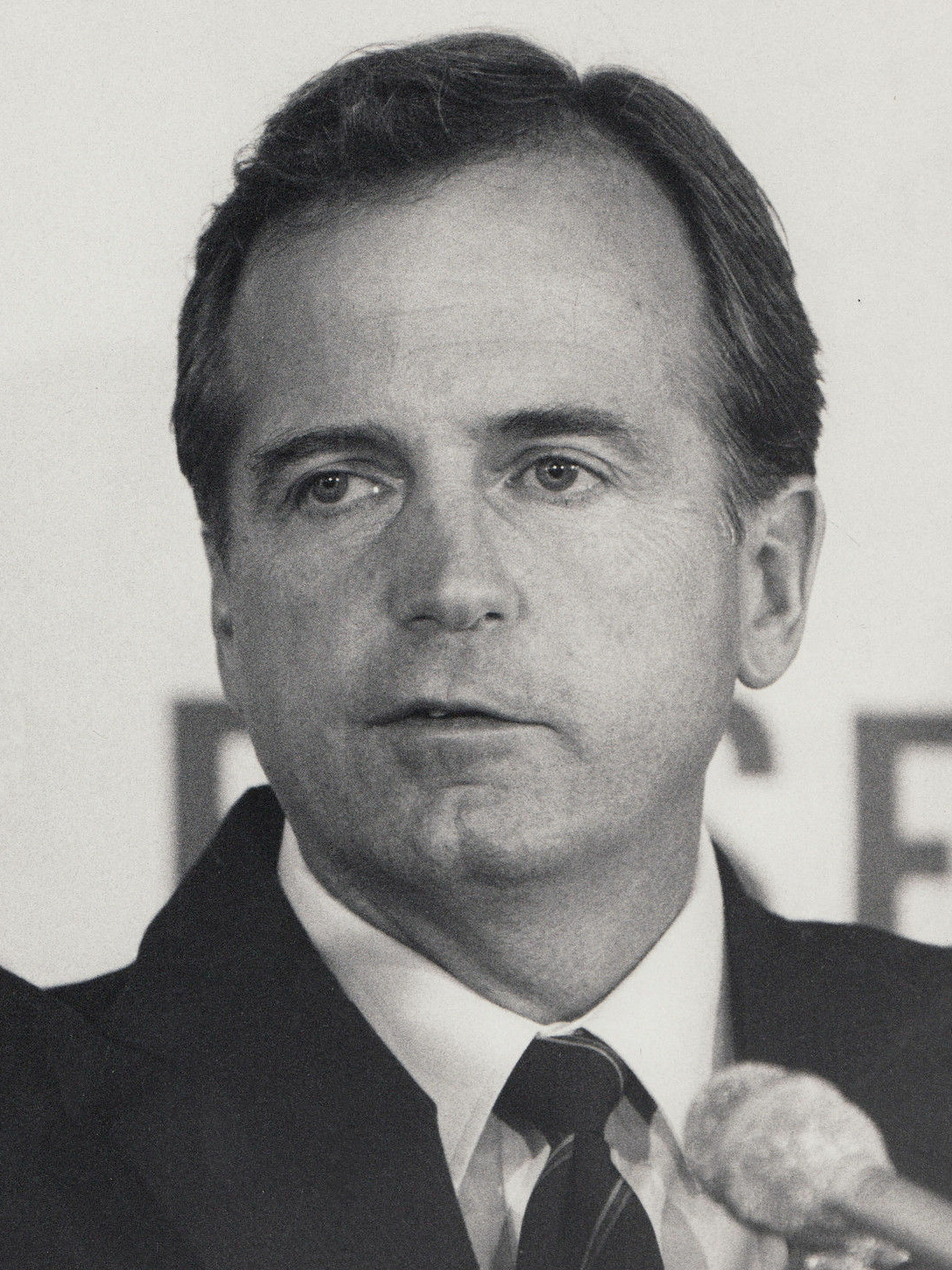
Former commissioner of baseball
Peter Ueberroth
from California
(1981–1989)

=== Declined ===
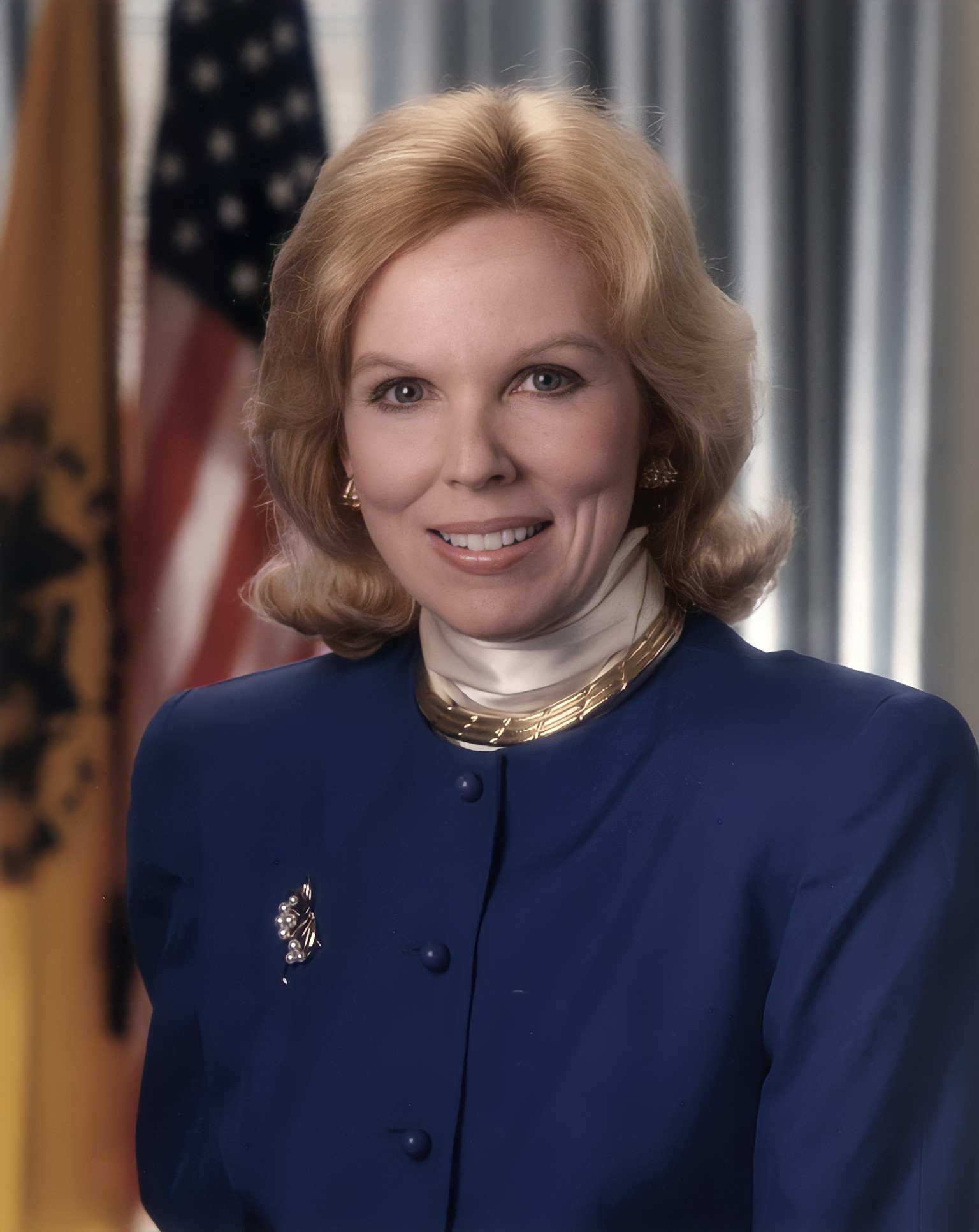
Director of the National Institutes of Health
Bernadine Healy
from Ohio
(1991–1993)

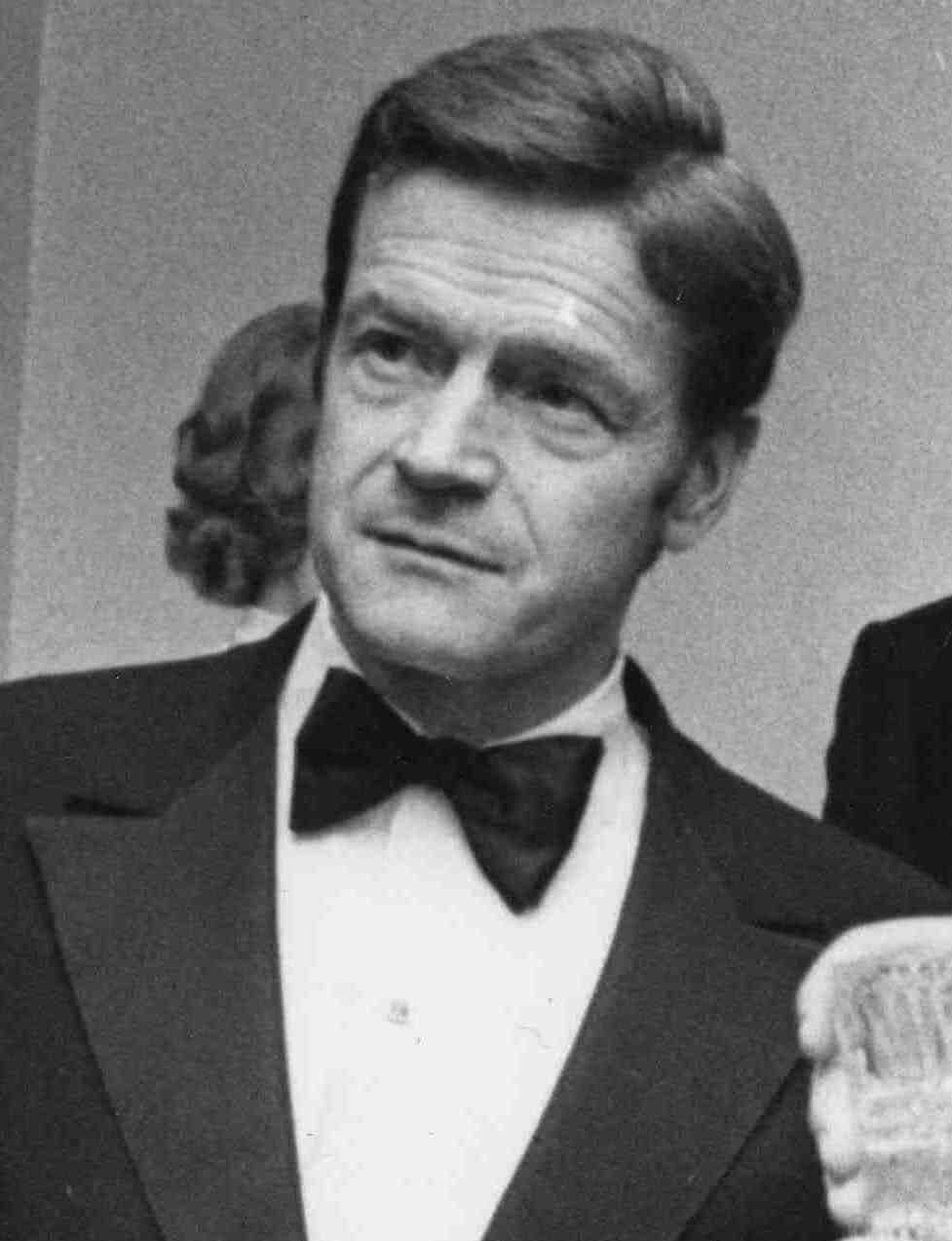
President of Boston University
John Silber
from Massachusetts
(1971–1996)

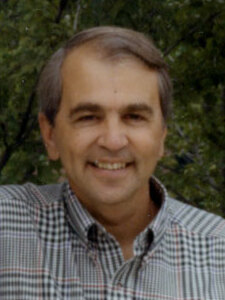
Former Senator and 1992 presidential candidate
Paul Tsongas
from Massachusetts
(1979–1985)

== See also ==
- 1992 United States presidential election
- Ross Perot 1992 presidential campaign
