= Booka Michel =

American musician and film producer

Robert "Booka" Michel
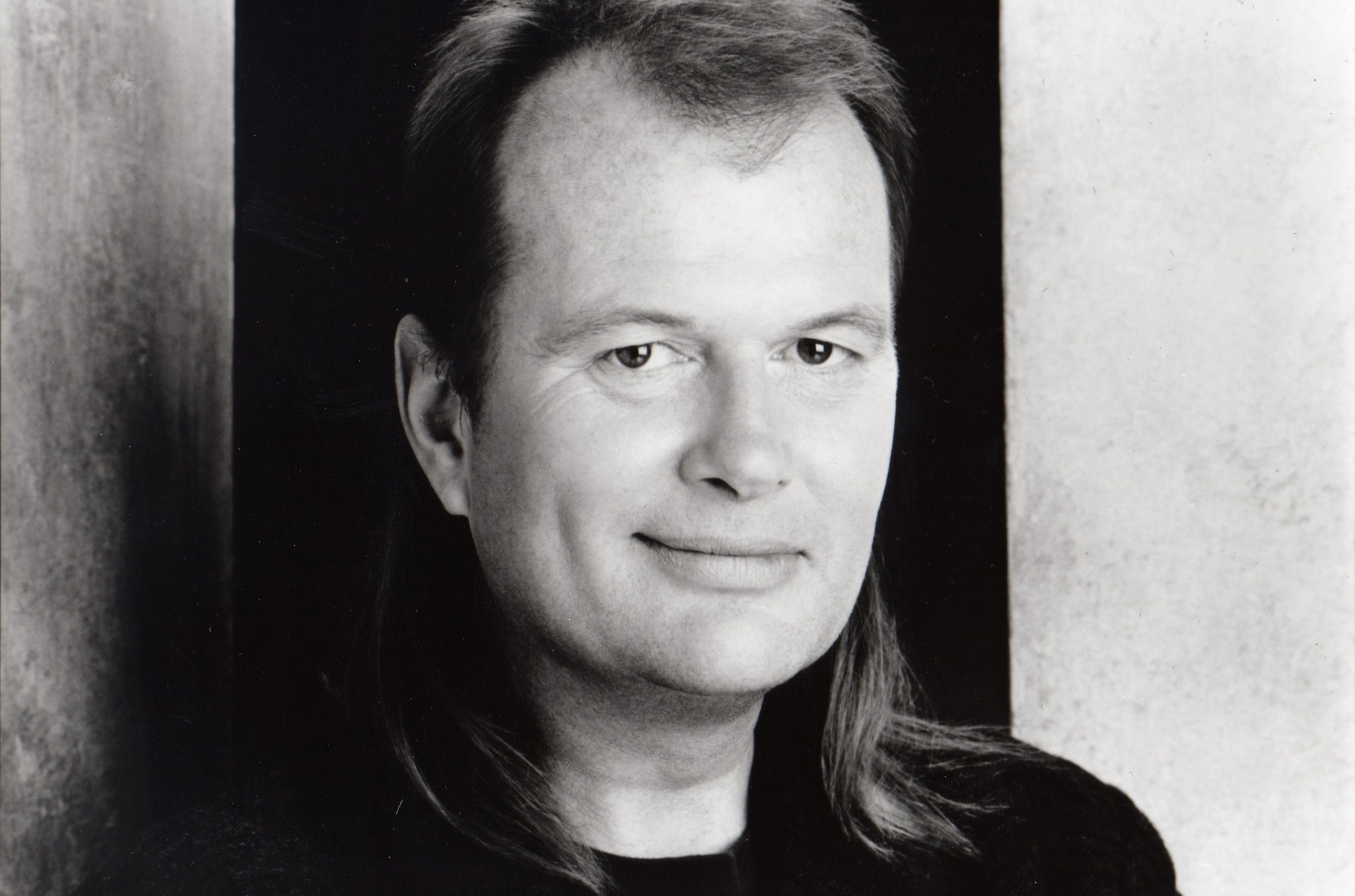
- Photo courtesy of Joe Henson
- Occupations: Musician and film producer
- Known for: Founding Loudhouse Music
- Website: Loudhouse Music

Booka Michel is an American musician and film producer.

== Early life ==
Michel was born October 15, 1954, and grew up in Grand Rapids, Minnesota. He moved to Austin, Texas in 1976 with his brother Carl Michel.

== Career ==
=== Beginnings ===
In Texas, Michel served as a session and tour percussionist for musicians including Hoyt Axton, Odetta, Pete Seeger, Arthur Brown, Butch Hancock, Jimmie Dale Gilmore, and Townes Van Zandt. There Michel also founded Loudhouse Records in Austin, Texas.

=== Film scoring and production ===
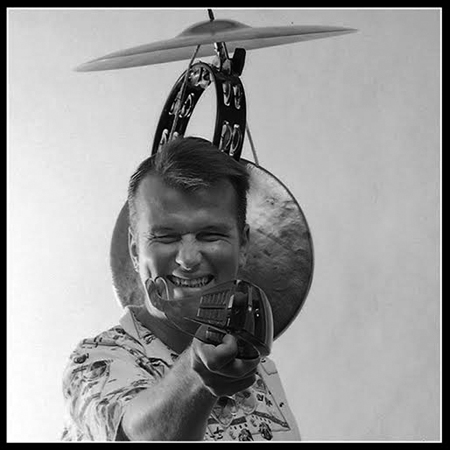
Booka Michel performing

Michel is the leader of his eponymous band Booka and the Flaming Geckos. The Geckos are longtime Austin musicians John X. Reed (Doug Sahm, Jimmy Dale Gilmore), Cindy Cashdollar (Bob Dylan, Van Morrison) and Glen Fukunaga (Joe Ely, The Dixie Chicks). They have released independent albums as well as produced the soundtracks to several independent movies. In 2009 the band released the soundtrack album for the film Baghdad Texas. The album made several Top 20 American Roots charts in the US over several months, including the Freeform American Roots Chart from July to September 2009. Country Weekly wrote that the blend had a "brief but enjoyable running time".

Michel also produced the film, which Variety states had "An inventive weirdo premise and a strong assortment of regional thesp[ian]s" from Texas. In 2011 the band released the soundtrack album The Not So Meaningful Songs in the Life of Jeremy Fink, written for Tamar Halpern's film adaptation of the children's book Jeremy Fink and the Meaning of Life and starring Mira Sorvino and Joe Pantoliano. Bill Bentley wrote of the album that, "The sounds of folk, bluegrass, some Civil War-inspired songs and, yes, even a taste of Acid Western captured with utter cool by Booka Michel and his Geckos feels like an accidental discovery of something quite cosmic. Happy accidents abound."

Frank John Hadley of Downbeat Magazine wrote, “String music spun from the rich loam of the past, but laden with fresh nutrients, [it] illuminates the dignity of ordinary rural folks of years long gone. [This] new album featuring acoustic string instruments upholds a romantic ideal without sounding anachronistic. No familiarity with the film necessary to enjoy fully formed songs and brief atmospheric passages." Under his own Loudhouse imprint, he has produced chart-topping albums for artists such as Mike Kindred and David Olney.
