= Panic Room =

2002 film by David Fincher

- Theatrical release poster
- Directed by: David Fincher
- Written by: David Koepp
- Produced by: Gavin Polone; Judy Hofflund; David Koepp; Ceán Chaffin
- Starring: Jodie Foster; Forest Whitaker; Dwight Yoakam; Jared Leto; Kristen Stewart
- Cinematography: Conrad W. Hall; Darius Khondji
- Edited by: James Haygood; Angus Wall
- Music by: Howard Shore
- Production companies: Columbia Pictures; Hofflund/Polone; Indelible Pictures
- Distributed by: Sony Pictures Releasing
- Release date: March 29, 2002
- Running time: 112 minutes
- Country: United States
- Language: English
- Budget: $48 million
- Box office: $197.1 million

Panic Room is a 2002 American thriller film directed by David Fincher. The film stars Jodie Foster and Kristen Stewart as a mother and daughter whose new home is invaded by burglars, played by Forest Whitaker, Jared Leto, and Dwight Yoakam. The script was written by David Koepp, whose screenplay was inspired by news coverage in 2000 about panic rooms.

The film was Fincher's fifth feature film, following Fight Club (1999). Fincher and Koepp brought together a crew of people with whom each had worked with before. The house and its panic room were built on a Raleigh Studios lot. Nicole Kidman was originally cast as the mother, but she left after aggravating a previous injury. Her departure threatened the completion of the film, but Foster quickly replaced Kidman. The filmmakers used computer-generated imagery to create the illusion of the film camera moving through the house's rooms. Foster became pregnant during the shooting schedule, so filming was suspended until after she gave birth. The film's production cost $48 million.

The film was commercially released in the United States and Canada on March 29, 2002 by Sony Pictures Releasing. The film grossed $30 million on its opening weekend. In the United States and Canada, it grossed $96.4 million. In other territories, it grossed $100.7 million for a worldwide total of $197.1 million. The film was positively reviewed by critics, who commended Fincher's direction and Foster's performance.

== Plot ==
Recently divorced Meg Altman and her eleven-year-old daughter, Sarah, move into a four-story brownstone in New York City's Upper West Side. The house's previous owner, a reclusive millionaire, had installed a "panic room" to protect himself from intruders. The room is reinforced with concrete and steel and features a thick steel door. It also includes an extensive security system with multiple surveillance cameras and a public address system.

On Meg and Sarah's first night in the house, three men break in: Junior, the previous owner's grandson; Burnham, an employee of the home's security company, who built the panic room; and Raoul, a thug brought along to the break in by Junior, without Burnham's knowledge. They intend to steal bearer bonds locked inside a floor safe in the panic room.

When Meg wakes during the night, she sees the men on the security cameras and rushes to the panic room with Sarah. To force them out, the men pump propane gas into the room's air vents. Meg ignites the gas while she and Sarah cover themselves with fireproof blankets; the ignited propane leaves Junior badly burned. Meg taps into the main telephone line and calls her philandering ex-husband, Stephen. As she tries to explain their situation, the intruders cut the line, ending the call.

When all attempts to breach the room fail, Junior gives up on the robbery but lets slip that there is more money in the safe than he initially disclosed. When he tries to leave, Raoul fatally shoots him and forces Burnham to continue with the robbery. Stephen arrives and is immediately taken hostage. Raoul severely beats him, ensuring that Meg sees it on the security camera. Sarah, a diabetic, suffers a seizure as her glucagon syringes are in her bedroom.

Raoul tricks Meg into thinking it is safe to temporarily leave the panic room. When she leaves to retrieve Sarah's medication, the men enter the room with Sarah inside. Meg throws the med kit in just as Burnham closes the door, inadvertently crushing Raoul's hand. She pleads with the men to give Sarah her medication, which Burnham eventually does. Two police officers arrive at the house, following up on Stephen's earlier 911 call and complaints from the neighbors. To protect Sarah, Meg convinces the officers that everything is fine, and they leave. Meanwhile, Burnham opens the safe and finds $22 million in bearer bonds inside.

As the men prepare to leave with Sarah as a hostage, Meg leads them into an ambush, using a sledgehammer to knock Raoul over a banister and into a stairwell. As Burnham flees, the injured Raoul crawls back up and overpowers Meg, preparing to bludgeon her with the sledgehammer. Hearing Sarah's terrified screams, Burnham rushes back and shoots Raoul, killing him. The police, alerted by Meg's earlier odd behavior, return in force and apprehend Burnham. He drops the bearer bonds, and they scatter into the wind.

A few days later, Meg and Sarah search the newspaper for a new, smaller home, having recovered from their ordeal.

== Cast ==
Actor		Role
Jodie Foster	...	Meg Altman
Kristen Stewart	...	Sarah Altman
Forest Whitaker	...	Burnham
Dwight Yoakam	...	Raoul
Jared Leto	...	Junior
Patrick Bauchau	...	Stephen Altman

Jodie Foster stars as Meg Altman, a recently divorced woman who, with her daughter Sarah, looks for a new home in New York City. Nicole Kidman was originally cast as Meg, but she left the project due to a knee injury. Foster, who almost joined the cast of Fincher's 1997 film The Game, replaced Kidman. Fincher said Kidman's portrayal was "about glamour and physicality", while Foster's portrayal was "more political". Meg was originally written to be helpless, but with Foster's involvement, the character was revised to be stronger. The casting change also led to Meg's character being rewritten to be similar to her daughter, whereas Meg had been different from her before. Foster became pregnant soon after she started filming. She told the filmmakers, and they decided to keep filming her scenes but with a wardrobe that would conceal her pregnancy. Studio executives did not like the dailies and suspended production until Foster gave birth and returned to perform re-shoots. Foster was reportedly paid $12 million for her role.

Kristen Stewart stars as Sarah, Meg's diabetic daughter. Hayden Panettiere was originally cast as Sarah, but when Nicole Kidman had to pull out, they went on with Kristen Stewart. Panic Room was Stewart's second feature film after The Safety of Objects (2001). When Kidman was cast as Meg, Fincher said Stewart was "to complement [Kidman's portrayal], to be her antithesis, tomboyish, androgynous, dismissive, a teenager at ten years old. It was about the daughter being a parent to her mother." When Foster replaced Kidman, the character Meg was rewritten so she and Sarah would be similar.

Forest Whitaker, Jared Leto, and Dwight Yoakam star as the film's burglars, Burnham, Junior, and Raoul, respectively. Whitaker's character Burnham was originally written to be "a slick, technical type" and the designer of the panic room in Meg and Sarah's home. Fincher did not think a designer could be persuaded to break into a home, so he rewrote the character to be a blue-collar worker who installs panic rooms for a living. The director told Whitaker to watch Key Largo (1948) and to emulate Humphrey Bogart's character. Whitaker said he liked Burnham's "conflicted" nature and preferred it to Raoul's villainy. Raoul was originally written to be "a giant scary hulking guy", but Fincher rewrote him to be "this wiry, mean kind of ex-con white trash guy". In one revised instance, Raoul punches Meg instead of slapping her to be reinforced as "an appalling character". The role of Raoul was originally offered to Maynard James Keenan, whom Fincher had directed in a music video for A Perfect Circle's "Judith". Keenan was too busy as the singer for Tool, so Fincher then offered the role to Yoakam, knowing him from his performance in Sling Blade (1996). For the role of Junior, Fincher cast Leto, who was in the cast of Fincher's previous film Fight Club (1999). As part of atypical class division, Junior is "the uptown rich kid", where Burnham is blue-collar, and Raoul is undefinable.

Patrick Bauchau had a minor role as Meg's ex-husband Stephen. Kidman, though she left the primary role due to her knee injury, had an uncredited off-screen role as the voice of Stephen's supermodel girlfriend. Screenwriter Andrew Kevin Walker, who contributed as writer for several of Fincher's previous films, had a cameo in Panic Room as a sleepy neighbor.

== Crew ==
Panic Room's crew includes:

- David Fincher – director
- David Koepp – screenwriter, producer
- Ceán Chaffin – producer
- Judy Hofflund – producer
- Gavin Polone – producer
- Howard Shore – composer
- Conrad W. Hall – cinematographer
- Darius Khondji – cinematographer
- James Haygood – editor
- Angus Wall – editor
- Arthur Max – production designer
- Keith Neely – art director
- James E. Tocci – art director
- Jon Danniells – set decorator
- Garrett Lewis – set decorator
- Michael Kaplan – costume designer

== Production ==
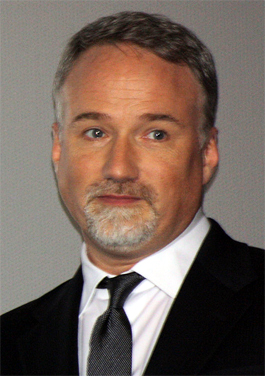
Director David Fincher

Panic Room was directed by David Fincher based on a screenplay written by David Koepp. The film, produced at Columbia Pictures, was Fincher's fifth feature film, following Fight Club (1999). Koepp was also a producer for Panic Room, and he was joined by Judy Hofflund and Gavin Polone, with whom he collaborated on Stir of Echoes (1999). Fincher included as producer Ceán Chaffin, with whom he had worked on commercials and music videos. Fincher also included in his initial crew people with whom he had worked before: cinematographer Darius Khondji, production designer Arthur Max, costume designer Michael Kaplan, and editors James Haygood and Angus Wall.

Fincher envisioned Panic Room as a popcorn movie about survival. His previous film Fight Club had 400 scenes and 100 locations, so he wanted to simplify the production of Panic Room. To this end, he wanted to focus production on a single set and to plan the scenes and shots thoroughly before the start of filming. Despite the preparation, he experienced difficulty in production with changes in the cast and the crew as well as the inherent inflexibility of his initial planning.

=== Development ===
Screenwriter David Koepp was inspired by news coverage in 2000 about how safe rooms were becoming prevalent among the wealthy living in urban areas. He sold the script to Sony Pictures for $4 million. Before Fincher's involvement, director Ridley Scott was briefly connected to the project, and actor-director Forest Whitaker studied the script before declining the opportunity to direct. Fincher said he was interested in the script's omniscience and that he was reminded of "the specific subjectivity" of Rear Window (1954). He also saw Panic Room as a cross between Rear Window and Straw Dogs (1971), though he was concerned "a modern audience" would compare Panic Room more to Home Alone (1990) than to Rear Window.

Fincher also saw Panic Room as a crime thriller similar to The Treasure of the Sierra Madre (1948), where money is "an object that everyone's after for the wrong reasons". The director was also interested in the story's conciseness of happening in one place and in one night, and how the screenplay was well-laid out to let the director decide a variety of shots and use of set-pieces. Fincher also saw the project as a way to be "in lock-step with the audience" in a change of pace from his previous films.

Koepp's screenplay emphasized pace over exposition. Koepp and Fincher agreed to streamline the film so the opening would introduce the characters as soon as possible. Fincher also sought to lay out the film so audiences could see characters make plans and thus be ahead of them, calling the tense foresight "a very cinematic notion". He wanted to track the different characters' agendas and to also keep scenes chronological, so he set up "computer-generated motion-control shots" to move the camera around the set. He planned scenes in which parallel scenes could be seen through the panic room's video monitors and also intercut between different characters. The final screenplay was similar in outline to the original one; there were minor changes in dialogue and specific moments, especially in the interaction between Meg and Sarah Altman due to Foster replacing Kidman. Explicit mention of Sarah's diabetes, such as the emergency syringe containing glucagon, were removed from the dialogue. Careful beverage intake, refrigerated medicine bottles, and Sarah's glucometer watch were intended as evidence of her diabetes.

=== Pre-production ===
The house was built on a soundstage on a Raleigh Studios lot. The set was designed by production designer Arthur Max, and it cost $6 million to build. The panic room was 6 feet (1.8 m) by 14 feet (4.3 m). Three versions of the room were built so Fincher could film scenes from multiple angles. A 3D computer model of the set on the soundstage was designed. Fincher, who had done pre-visualization for Fight Club, used the model to design shots and decide their sequence. The computer model also enabled the camera to have "total freedom to travel" inside the house. Fincher said, "What we were just trying to do with CG was to say, there's no camera operator, there's no crew, there's no track, and the camera can go everywhere." The crew applied photogrammetry—"mapping still images over the surface of computer-generated 'sets'". The filming schedule was also shortened since camera setups could be evaluated and discarded virtually. Fincher had two-thirds of Panic Room's shots planned before the start of filming. Director Steven Soderbergh reviewed Fincher's test footage and warned him that excessive planning would make actual production difficult for him and his crew.

Fincher sought to light his film less than most other films; he believed darkness contributed to the scare factor. Entering production, he initially planned to film the first half of the film in near-total darkness but decided that it required too much patience from audiences. Instead, he chose a "shadowy ambience" as a backdrop for Meg and Sarah Altman.

=== Casting and filming ===
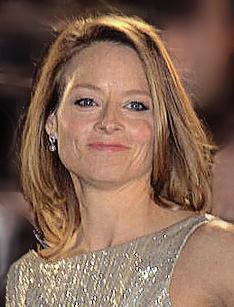
Jodie Foster was cast in the lead role after original star Nicole Kidman exited due to injury. Foster learned she was pregnant five weeks into filming her scenes.

Casting began in 2000, with Nicole Kidman and Hayden Panettiere cast as Meg and Sarah Altman, the film's mother and daughter. Forest Whitaker, Jared Leto, and Dwight Yoakam were also cast as the film's burglars. In December 2000, before the start of filming, Panettiere left the project, and was replaced by Kristen Stewart. In her 2026 memoir This Is Me: A Reckoning, Panettiere revealed that she later learned from a former manager that director David Fincher had wanted her to cut her hair into a bob to more closely resemble Jodie Foster but Panettiere’s mother and manager, Lesley Vogel, refused the request, which Panettiere said was the reason she was ultimately replaced by Kristen Stewart.

Filming began in January 2001. Shortly after the start of filming, cinematographer Darius Khondji was fired from the film. Khondji said he was fired after a conflict with a crew member that he did not want to name, but David Fincher said he and Khondji could not agree "on aspects of production". Much of the film was already planned in pre-production, and Khondji could not be given flexibility. Fincher replaced Khondji with Conrad W. Hall, with whom he found "a balance". Khondji said he supported Hall as his replacement.

After two weeks of filming, at the end of January 2001, Kidman was injured on set. An x-ray revealed a hairline fracture underneath one of her knee joints. The fracture was an injury from Kidman's filming of Moulin Rouge! (2001), and the fracture had never fully healed. When Kidman left the project, Fincher continued filming scenes that did not include her character. During the same time of Kidman's departure, the Writers Guild of America and the Screen Actors Guild were threatening to strike over contractual disputes, so Fincher was pressured to re-cast the role of Meg Altman before it took place. Since the film was early in production, Fincher was ready to shut down, but the studio wanted to continue production and find a replacement. If the studio had shut down production permanently, it would have collected $3 million from insurance. If production was shut down then restarted, it would cost the studio $10 million, necessitating a quick replacement for Kidman. Rumored actors included Sandra Bullock, Angelina Jolie, and Robin Wright. Jodie Foster was previously occupied with directing duties of Flora Plum before its star Russell Crowe was injured and left the project, leading to that production's shutdown. To join Panic Room, Foster also stepped down as head of the awards jury at the 2001 Cannes Film Festival. (Note: James Swallow says Cannes festival organizers were reportedly unhappy with Foster's decision to step down and as a result, they removed The Dangerous Lives of Altar Boys, which she produced and starred in, from the festival schedule.) Foster had a week to prepare for her role before filming resumed.

Five weeks after Foster began filming Panic Room, she learned she was pregnant. She informed Fincher and his producer Chaffin of her pregnancy, and they decided to continue filming. Fincher did not want to rush production, so Foster changed her wardrobe from a tank top to a heavy sweater to disguise indications of her pregnancy. For action scenes, stunt double Jill Stokesberry replaced Foster.

In the film's progression, the house degrades in quality, so Fincher filmed scenes in continuity as the set changed. He also filmed many sequences twice due to their near-parallel appearance on the panic room's video monitors. Editor Wall said there were 2,073 set-ups for the film with most set-ups having two cameras. One repeated take was when Raoul attempts to break into the panic room through the plaster ceiling below it. The plaster took 45 minutes to replace, so combined with repeated takes, a scene that was an eighth of a page in the script took two days to film. Another repeated take was one five-second shot being filmed over a hundred times: Meg being attacked by Raoul and dropping Sarah's medical kit. The shot was repeated so it would look like Meg did not toss the kit but instead lost it. Simultaneously, the kit needed to land in frame and in focus for the audience. Fincher argued for repeated takes so he could combine performances by the actors for "fluid" scenes. He also repeated takes with Stewart to ensure that her acting would be comparable to Foster's veteran performance.

The studio planned to release Panic Room in February 2002, but it determined that production could not be completed by then. Executives reviewed dailies of the film's opening scene and did not like Foster "hiding her stomach under a coat and purse". (Foster was also suffering from a sprained hip from distended ligaments due to her pregnancy.) The studio suspended production until after Foster's childbirth and rescheduled for the film to be released in March 2002. Foster gave birth to her second son in September 2001, and she returned to perform re-shoots, including the opening scene. She also returned two months later for additional filming, which concluded that November. Columbia Pictures screened the film for test audiences, who rated poorly the ending with the SWAT raid and Burnham's capture. By the screening, the set had been deconstructed due to storage costs, and Fincher estimated that it would cost $3 million to rebuild enough of the set to reshoot the ending. Instead, editors Haygood and Wall revisited Burnham's scenes and chose takes in which the character would appear less sympathetic. The final production budget for Panic Room was $48 million.

=== Visual and practical effects ===
A seamless shot at the beginning of Panic Room took nine days to film on set but took several months to complete in post-production. The shot was a combination of camera footage and computer-generated effects. Koepp originally wrote the opening scene to be a series of shots that would zero in on the brownstone house, but Fincher instead chose a sequence of landmarks in New York City with credits hovering in front of them before the sequence transited seamlessly to introduce the film's main characters. The opening titles were inspired by those seen in The Trouble with Harry (1955) and North by Northwest (1959). The scene of Burnham's arrest also used computer-generated effects. Several scenes also involved practical effects: Junior's injuries from a flaming gas burn and Stephen Altman's bloodied, beaten self. A team of puppeteers was used to move Stephen's sticking-out collarbone. Fincher also sent the film reel to be digitally color-corrected as he had done for Fight Club and Seven.

=== Music ===
The score was composed, orchestrated, and conducted by Howard Shore and performed by the Hollywood Studio Symphony. The soundtrack was released in 2002 by Varèse Sarabande.

== Theatrical run ==
Columbia Pictures marketed Panic Room as being produced by the same director who produced Seven and Fight Club. Fincher disagreed with the approach because he believed that Panic Room did not match the tone of his previous two films and that it would not appeal to the same audiences. He believed Panic Room would appeal more to audiences who saw Kiss the Girls (1997) and The Bone Collector (1999). He also disagreed with the studio's marketing materials for Panic Room, which advertised it as "the most terrifying movie ever made". Fincher also argued with the studio about the poster design, which he believed reflected the film's themes, and the studio relented in publishing Fincher's poster.

Panic Room had its world premiere on March 18, 2002 in Los Angeles. Fincher refused to edit the film to receive a PG-13 rating (parental guidance for children under 13) from the Motion Picture Association of America, so the MPAA gave the film an R rating (restricted to filmgoers at least 17 years old) for violence and language. It was commercially released in the United States and Canada on March 29, 2002. It was screened in 3,053 theaters and grossed $30 million on its opening weekend. It ranked first at the box office, (Note: Panic Room was one of the weekend's four new releases; the others were The Rookie, Clockstoppers, and Death to Smoochy. However, its main competition was Ice Age, which was in its third weekend and ranked second at the box office.) and for both actor Jodie Foster and director David Fincher, the opening weekend gross was a personal best to date. It surpassed The Matrix (1999) to have the biggest Easter holiday-weekend opening and also had the third biggest opening to date for a non-supernatural thriller film, following Hannibal (2001) and Ransom (1996). Audiences polled by CinemaScore, during the opening-weekend, gave Panic Room a "B" grade on an A+ to F scale. The audience demographic was 53% female and 47% male, and 62% of audience members were aged 25 years and older.

In the film's second weekend (April 5–7) in the United States and Canada, it ranked first again with $18.2 million, competing mainly with the new release High Crimes. The film went on to gross $96.4 million at the US and Canadian box office and $100 million in other territories' box offices for a worldwide total of $196.4 million. (In 2006, the film had a re-release in Hong Kong that grossed $682 thousand, increasing the total to $197.1 million.) The film was Fincher's second highest-grossing to date after Se7en, which grossed $327.3 million worldwide. In the United States and Canada, Panic Room ranks fifth among David Fincher's films in box office gross. Adjusted for inflation, Panic Room ranks third. Worldwide, unadjusted for inflation, it ranks fifth.

== Critical reception ==
Critics called Panic Room "a high-tension narrative". They compared the film to the works of Alfred Hitchcock, both positively and negatively. Several critics thought the film was too mainstream after Fincher's Fight Club. The review aggregator Rotten Tomatoes, classifying reviews as positive or negative, reported 146 reviews as positive and 45 as negative for a score of 76%. Of the subset of reviews that had scores, the average rating was 6.9/10. Rotten Tomatoes summarized the critics' consensus, "Elevated by David Fincher's directorial talent and Jodie Foster's performance, Panic Room is a well-crafted, above-average thriller." Of 36 reviews, Metacritic categorized 23 as positive, 13 as mixed, and 0 as negative, and it gave weighted average score of 65 out of 100, indicating "generally favorable reviews".

Joe Morgenstern of The Wall Street Journal said, "Seven was stylishly gloomy, and Fight Club was smarmily pretentious, while Panic Room has been admirably stripped down to atmosphere as a function of architecture, and action as a consequence of character." Morgenstern commended the characters Meg and Sarah as feminist heroines and also called the home invaders "intriguing". He also applauded Foster's performance and the film's cinematography, and he said to Koepp's script as "all worked out too". Film critic Roger Ebert gave the film three stars out of four, describing Panic Room as close to "the ideal of a thriller existing entirely in a world of physical and psychological plausibility." Ebert wrote, "There are moments when I want to shout advice at the screen, but just as often the characters are ahead of me." Ebert also called Fincher "a visual virtuoso", and applauded Foster's performance as "spellbinding".

== Home media ==
Panic Room was first released on VHS and DVD on September 17, 2002 by Columbia TriStar Home Entertainment. The studio produced VHS copies for rental only, believing that owners of DVD players were more likely to buy the film. The studio used the design from the theatrical release poster for the video cover, where Fincher had wanted a black cover that would differ from the poster. Though previsualization supervisor Ron Frankel wanted to include materials to show storyboard animation, the DVD was released as a single-disc edition with no audio commentary or other features. Fincher also chose not to include on the DVD scenes filmed with Nicole Kidman before she was replaced by Jodie Foster. In its first week, the film ranked second in DVD sales after Monsters, Inc., though it ranked first in DVD rentals. In March 2004, the studio released a special edition DVD, which consisted of three discs, two which provided featurettes of the pre-production, production, and post-production processes for the film. The DVD also had several commentary tracks, including one by the director. Author John T. Caldwell cites the special edition DVD of Panic Room as an example of demonstrating directorial control to "aesthetically elevate" the film.

Columbia Pictures sold the television rights for Panic Room to Turner Broadcasting and CBS, who shared the rights over five years. In September 2004, Turner aired the film on channels TBS and TNT for 12 months, and afterward, CBS aired the film three times in an 18-month span. Turner resumed airing Panic Room for 30 months after CBS's turn.

In 2014, The A.V. Club listed Panic Room as one of 15 films which (at the time) notably lacked a Blu-ray release. A decade later, Fincher would go on to supervise a 4K remaster of the film, which Sony would ultimately release on Ultra HD Blu-ray on February 18, 2025, in a special Steelbook edition also containing a standard Blu-ray disc and including the special features originally produced for DVD, marking its official debut on both formats.

== Accolades ==
Howard Shore won from the American Society of Composers, Authors and Publishers an ASCAP Award in the Top Box Office Film music category for his scores for Panic Room and The Lord of the Rings: The Two Towers. The Art Directors Guild nominated Panic Room for the Excellence in Production Design for a Contemporary Film Award. The Online Film Critics Society Award nominated Panic Room for Best Editing. Panic Room won an award at the 3rd Golden Trailer Awards for having the Best Horror/Thriller film trailer, beating fellow nominees Signs, Brotherhood of the Wolf, Jurassic Park III, and No Such Thing. For her performance in the film, Jodie Foster was nominated for a Saturn Award for Best Actress.

== Remake ==
In December 2024, Sony Pictures began development of a Brazilian remake with Ísis Valverde attached to the lead role.

== See also ==
- List of films featuring home invasions
- List of films featuring surveillance
- List of films featuring diabetes
- List of thriller films of the 2000s
- List of American films of 2002
- Cinema of the United States
