= Messages Deleted =

- DVD cover
- Directed by: Rob Cowan
- Written by: Larry Cohen
- Produced by: Rob Cowan
- Starring: Matthew Lillard; Deborah Kara Unger; Gina Holden; Serge Houde
- Release date: 2009
- Running time: 92 mins
- Country: Canada
- Language: English

Messages Deleted is a 2009 Canadian horror thriller film starring Matthew Lillard, with a screenplay by Larry Cohen, the last Cohen screenplay to be filmed before his death in 2019.

== Plot ==
A screenwriting teacher is forced to live out the plot of a screenplay idea he stole from an anonymous character, who now seeks revenge.

== Cast ==
- Matthew Lillard as Joel Brandt
- Deborah Kara Unger as Det. Lavery
- Gina Holden as Millie Councel
- Serge Houde as Det. Breedlove
- Chiara Zanni as Claire
- Michael Eklund as Adam Brickles
- Xantha Radley as Nurse Bev
- Ken Kramer as Ben Brandt
- Brandon Jay McLaren as Dude up Front
- Woody Jeffreys as Patrick
- Ildiko Ferenczi as Kathy
- Paul Lazenby as Tractor
- Anna Galvin as Lisa Kwan
- Biski Gugushe as Tech as Shrink
- Parm Soor as Limo Driver

== Production ==
Plans to create the film were first announced around September 2004. Filming took place in Vancouver. Larry Cohen was paid $3 million for the script, which he completed in 2004. Multiple changes were made to the script prior to filming, one of which was to change the killer's gender from male to female. The film marked Cohen's last screenplay before his death in 2019.

== Release ==
Messages Deleted was released straight to video in 2009. Per Cohen, prior to its release the movie was leaked online, causing the producers to lose $4 million in investments. This contributed to the production company's bankruptcy and eventual closure.

== Reception ==
Tony Williams criticized the film's script, noting that the edition released in England "contains too many superfluous elements that could have been eliminated making it a much more tightly constructed film". David Nusair reviewed the film for ReelFilm, writing that "there does reach a point at which Messages Deleted effectively becomes just a little too slick and calculating for its own good. This is despite an unexpectedly strong turn from star Lillard and the inclusion of a few genuinely suspenseful sequences (ie Joel is forced to watch helplessly as a loved one is murdered), with the all-too-brief glimpses into what could have been only confirming the film's place as a disappointing missed opportunity."
