= A Stir of Echoes =

Novel by Richard Matheson

- First edition
- Author: Richard Matheson
- Language: English
- Genre: Horror
- Publisher: J. B. Lippincott & Co.
- Publication date: 1958
- Publication place: United States
- Media type: Print
- Pages: 224

A Stir of Echoes is a supernatural novel by American writer Richard Matheson, published in 1958. It served as the inspiration for the 1999 film Stir of Echoes.

== Plot synopsis ==
Tom Wallace lived an ordinary life, until a chance event awakened psychic abilities which he never knew he possessed. Now he is hearing the private thoughts of the people around him and learning shocking secrets which he never wanted to know.

But as Tom's existence becomes a waking nightmare, even greater jolts are in store. He becomes the unwilling recipient of a message from the afterlife.

== Reception ==
Galaxy reviewer Floyd C. Gale praised the novel, saying "Matheson expertly builds a mood of horror and terror that only on one occasion exceeds credulity." Damon Knight, however, dismissed it as "a thin and banal ghost story with psi trimmings, written in a Chippendale Chinese style."
