= Things That Hang from Trees =

Things That Hang From Trees
- Directed by: Ido Mizrahy
- Written by: Aaron Louis Tordini
- Produced by: Joseph Zolfo
- Starring: Deborah Kara Unger; Daniel Von Bargen; Ray McKinnon; Peter Gerety; Laila Robins; Cooper Musgrove; Jason Antoon; Yul Vazquez; Marco St. John
- Music by: Michael Galasso
- Distributed by: Radio London Films
- Release date: March 11, 2006
- Running time: 98 minutes
- Country: United States
- Language: English

Things That Hang from Trees is a 2006 drama film directed by Ido Mizrahy and written by Aaron Louis Tordini. It is based on the novella of the same name by Aaron Louis Tordini, under the pen name T. A. Louis.

== Plot ==
Florida, 1969. 8-year-old asthmatic Tommy Wheeler is incorrectly seen as mentally-impaired by many of the local townspeople. Tommy lives alone with his mother, Connie Mae, a sex shop owner. This emotionally troubled child also struggles with painful memories of his abusive, estranged father, Tom, whose mistreatment he recreates in a self-flagellating manner by systematically subjecting himself to the sadism of the 12-year-old local bully, Bear Hadley. While the town barber, George Burgess, a psychotically religious zealot, obsesses over Connie Mae, Tommy fantasizes about watching the town fireworks from atop the local lighthouse. The boy finally realizes this dream.

== Cast ==
- Deborah Kara Unger as Connie Mae Wheeler
- Daniel Von Bargen as George Burgess
- Ray McKinnon as Tom Wheeler Sr.
- Peter Gerety as Ump
- Laila Robins as Miss Millie
- Cooper Musgrove as Tommy Wheeler
- Jason Antoon as Bobby Mecklem
- Yul Vazquez as Juan Lopez
- Marco St. John as Sheriff Hank Bullard
- Marylouise Burke as Joan Kayser
- Jayne Houdyshell as Pam Dupont

== Distributor ==
- Radio London Films

== Release ==
Things That Hang from Trees premiered at the 2006 South by Southwest film festival. In 2015 the film was selected to become part of the Museum of Modern Art's permanent collection.

== Reception ==
Reception for Things That Hang from Trees was mixed. Reviewers for The Austin Chronicle and Variety were critical. Kimberly Jones of The Austin Chronicle noted that "any time one story really gets cooking, we're jettisoned to another – but the ensemble cast does good work, and the location becomes a character unto itself." Ronnie Scheib of Variety also praised the acting while also stating that "Neither adopting Tommy’s p.o.v. nor allowing the other characters enough autonomy to create multiple perspectives, pic lacks an overarching aesthetic drive and floats stagnantly in its own frame of reference."

Nick Schager of Slant rated the movie at 2 out of 5 stars, writing "Mostly, though, Mizrahy’s film feels like Flannery O’Conner without the atmosphere of near-oppressive religiosity, or William Faulkner without the hypnotic surreality—or, to put it bluntly, like a giant symbolic drag."

Filmdienst noted the presence of Southern Gothic elements in the plot and the critique of the petit-bourgeois milieu depicted.

=== Awards ===
- 2006: Best Film, American Independents, Troia International Film Festival
- 2008: Best Film, Corto Imola International Film
- 2008: Award of Excellence, Accolade Competition
