= Deborah Kara Unger =

Canadian actress (born 1966)

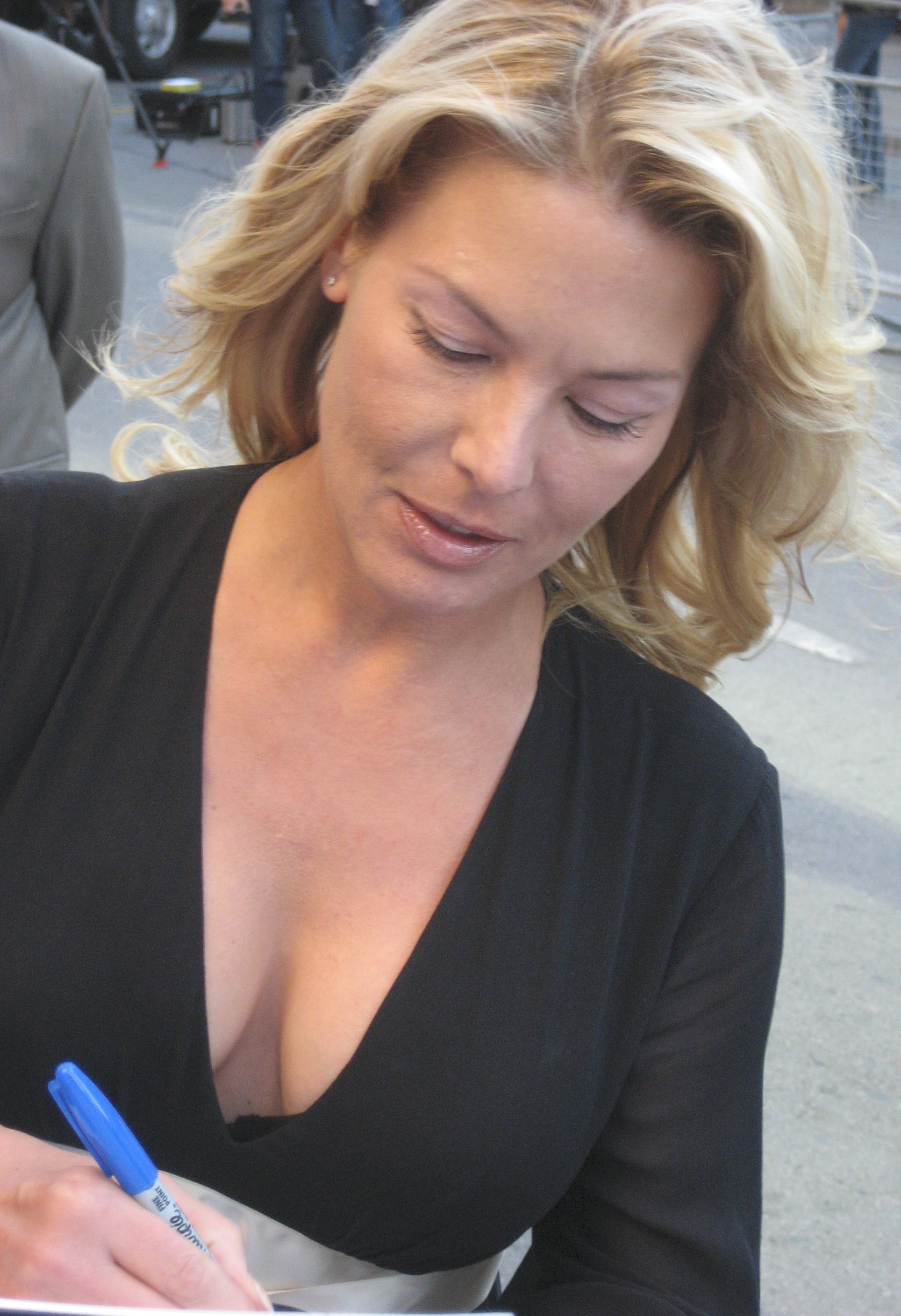
- Unger at the premiere of Cassandra's Dream, Toronto International Film Festival 2007
- Born: 12 May 1966 (age 60); Vancouver, British Columbia, Canada
- Occupation: Actress
- Years active: 1989–present

Deborah Kara Unger (born 12 May 1966) is a Canadian actress. She is known for her roles in the films Highlander III: The Sorcerer (1994), Crash (1996), The Game (1997), Payback (1999), The Hurricane (1999), White Noise (2005), Silent Hill (2006), 88 Minutes (2008) and The Way (2010).

== Early life ==
Deborah Kara Unger was born in Vancouver, British Columbia, Canada to a nuclear disposal specialist mother and a gynaecologist father. She was the first Canadian to be accepted into Australia's National Institute of Dramatic Art.

== Career ==
Upon graduation Unger found steady work in Australian films and television series, including Bangkok Hilton with Nicole Kidman. Following her return to North America in the early 1990s she appeared in David Lynch's 1993 HBO mini-series Hotel Room, and a year later appeared in Highlander III: The Sorcerer opposite Christopher Lambert.

Unger's breakthrough role came in David Cronenberg's 1996 erotic drama Crash, about a group of people who take sexual pleasure from car accidents, a notable form of paraphilia. Unger followed up her performance in Crash by starring with Michael Douglas in the psychological thriller The Game, directed by David Fincher. In 1998 she played Ava Gardner in HBO's The Rat Pack, and in 1999 she appeared in Payback with Mel Gibson, The Hurricane with Denzel Washington and the award-winning ensemble drama Sunshine.

Unger appeared in many independent films in the early 2000s, such as Signs and Wonders, Ten Tiny Love Stories, Fear X, Thirteen, Stander, Hollywood North, Emile, Paranoia 1.0 and A Love Song for Bobby Long. She played a leading role opposite Sophia Loren and Mira Sorvino in the 2002 independent movie Between Strangers, about three women who confront their pasts which changes their futures, for which she was nominated on Genie Award for Best Performance by an Actress in a Leading Role.

From 2005 to 2010, Unger appeared in White Noise, Things That Hang from Trees, The Alibi, Silent Hill, 88 Minutes, Walled In, Messages Deleted and The Way. She also appeared in the music video for "Jesus of Suburbia" by American rock band Green Day. In 2011, she took a starring role in the television series Combat Hospital, and in 2012 reprised her role as Dahlia Gillespie in the horror film sequel Silent Hill: Revelation.

== Filmography ==
=== Film ===
Year	Title	Role	Notes
1990	Blood Oath	Sister Littell	Original title: Prisoners of the Sun
1990	Breakaway	Marion	Original title: Escape from Madness
1991	Till There Was You	Anna Vivaldi	
1992	Whispers in the Dark	Eve Abergray	
1994	Highlander III: The Sorcerer	Dr. Alexandra Johnson / Sarah Barrington	
1996	Crash	Catherine Ballard	
1996	No Way Home	Lorraine	
1997	Keys to Tulsa	Vicky Michaels Stover	
1997	The Game	Christine / Claire	
1998	Luminous Motion	Mom	
1999	Payback	Lynn Porter	
1999	The Weekend	Marian Kerr	
1999	Sunshine	Maj. Carole Kovács	
1999	The Hurricane	Lisa Peters	
2000	Signs & Wonders	Katherine	
2002	The Salton Sea	Colette Vaughn	
2002	Between Strangers	Catherine	
2002	Leo	Caroline	
2002	Ten Tiny Love Stories	Seven	
2003	Thirteen	Brooke LaLaine	
2003	Fear X	Kate	
2003	Hollywood North	Sandy Ryan	
2003	Stander	Bekkie Stander	
2003	Emile	Nadia / Nadia's Mother	
2004	Paranoia 1.0	Trish	
2005	A Love Song for Bobby Long	Georgianna	
2005	White Noise	Sarah Tate	
2006	The Alibi	Dorothy	
2006	Things That Hang from Trees	Connie Mae Wheeler	
2006	Silent Hill	Dahlia Gillespie	
2007	88 Minutes	Carol Lynn Johnson	
2007	Shake Hands with the Devil	Emma	
2009	Walled In	Mary	
2010	Transparency	Danielle	
2010	The Way	Sarah	
2010	Sophie & Sheba	Tina Bradshaw	
2010	Messages Deleted	Det. Lavery	
2011	The Maiden Danced to Death	Lynn Court	
2012	The Samaritan	Helena	
2012	A Dark Truth	Morgan Swinton	
2012	186 Dollars to Freedom	Consul Powers	
2012	Silent Hill: Revelation	Dahlia Gillespie	
2013	Samuel Bleak	Roselyn Ramirez	
2015	Rehearsal	Ellen Sinclair	
2017	Vengeance: A Love Story	Agnes	
2017	A Thought of Ecstasy	Liz Archer	
2017	Jackals	Kathy Powell	
2017	Torch	Sister Ingrid	
2022	The Long Night	The Master	

=== Television ===
Year	Title	Role	Notes
1989	Bangkok Hilton	Astra	TV miniseries
1990	Rafferty's Rules	Jill Bennett	Episode: "Many Happy Returns"
1993	Hotel Room	Sasha	Episode: "Getting Rid of Robert"
1994	State of Emergency	Sue Payton	TV film
1998	The Rat Pack	Ava Gardner	TV film
2009	Angel and the Bad Man	Temperance	TV film
2011	Combat Hospital	Maj. Grace Pederson, M.D.	13 episodes
2015	A Dangerous Arrangement	Samantha	TV film
2015	The Hollow	Aunt Cora	TV film

=== Video games ===
Year	Title	Role	Notes
2011	Star Wars: The Old Republic	SCORPIO	Voice

=== Music videos ===
Year	Artist	Title	Role
2005	Green Day	"Jesus of Suburbia"	Jimmy's/Jesus's mother

== Awards and nominations ==
Year	Result	Award	Category	Film
2000	Won	Seattle International Film Festival	Citation of Excellence for Ensemble Cast Performance	The Weekend
2000	Nominated	Genie Awards	Best Performance by an Actress in a Supporting Role	Sunshine
2003	Nominated	Genie Awards	Best Performance by an Actress in a Leading Role	Between Strangers
2003	Won	Dubrovnik International Film Festival	Libertas Award	
2003	Nominated	Sonoma Valley Film Festival	Imagery Honors Award	
2004	Won	Method Fest	Best Actress	Emile
2005	Won	Málaga International Week of Fantastic Cinema	Best Actress	One Point O
2010	Won	Action on Film International Film Festival	Half-Life Award	
