= The Alibi =

- Theatrical release poster
- Directed by: Kurt Mattila; Matt Checkowski
- Written by: Noah Hawley
- Produced by: Erik Feig; Patrick Wachsberger; James D. Stern; Paul Hellerman
- Starring: Steve Coogan; Rebecca Romijn; Selma Blair
- Cinematography: Enrique Chediak
- Edited by: James Haygood; Amy Duddleston
- Music by: Alexandre Desplat
- Production company: Endgame Entertainment
- Distributed by: Destination Films; Summit Entertainment
- Release dates: January 12, 2006 (South Korea); June 17, 2006 (CineVegas International Film Festival)
- Running time: 90 minutes
- Country: United States
- Language: English

The Alibi is a 2006 American film directed by Kurt Mattila and Matt Checkowski and written by Noah Hawley. It stars Steve Coogan, Rebecca Romijn, and Selma Blair. The film was shown at 2006 CineVegas. The film was released to DVD on December 5, 2006, under the title Lies and Alibis.

== Premise ==
A man who runs an alibi agency, a service for adulterous husbands and wives that provides airtight alibis, runs into trouble with his latest client. In order to remedy the problem, he has to rely on an enticing woman, his assistant and partner. The plot thickens when he switches identities with one of his clients for a weekend, and the client's girlfriend dies in an accident. With the police, an assassin, and a jealous ex-boyfriend to run from, he discovers that he will need all the ingenuity he can muster to survive.

== Cast ==
- Steve Coogan as Ray Elliott
- Rebecca Romijn as Lola
- Selma Blair as Adelle
- James Brolin as Robert Hatch
- Sam Elliott as The Mormon
- Jaime King as Heather Price
- John Leguizamo as Hannibal
- James Marsden as Wendell Hatch
- Debi Mazar as Detective Bryce
- Henry Rollins as "Putty"
- Deborah Kara Unger as Dorothy
- Terry Crews as "Crazy Eight"
- Jarreth Merz as The Quiet Man

== Reception ==
On the review aggregator website Rotten Tomatoes, 57% of 7 critics' reviews are positive.
