= James Haygood =

American film editor

James Haygood is a film editor who has worked in the film industry since the late 1990s. He first began editing in the mid-1980s when he partnered with David Fincher, who was a music video director then. For Fincher, Haygood edited numerous music videos including Madonna's "Vogue" and The Rolling Stones's "Love Is Strong". The editor also worked on several TV commercials before editing several feature films directed by Fincher. Since working with Fincher, he has edited several feature films and continues to work on commercials.

== Filmography ==
- The Game (1997)
- Fight Club (1999)
- Panic Room (2002) – co-edited with Angus Wall
- The Alibi (2006) – co-edited with Amy E. Duddleston
- The Astronaut Farmer (2006)
- Where the Wild Things Are (2009) – co-edited with Eric Zumbrunnen
- Tron: Legacy (2010)
- The Lone Ranger (2013) – co-edited with Craig Wood

Haygood also worked as an additional editor on I Love Your Work (2003) and Eternal Sunshine of the Spotless Mind (2004) and also edited five episodes of the 2005 TV series Unscripted.
