= The Beginning (The X-Files) =

- The X-Files episode
- Sandy's body, after an alien gestated and burst forth from his chest. The character was played by series casting director Rick Millikan.
- Episode no.: Season 6 Episode 1
- Directed by: Kim Manners
- Written by: Chris Carter
- Production code: 6ABX01
- Original air date: November 8, 1998
- Running time: 45 minutes

Guest appearances
- Mitch Pileggi as Walter Skinner; James Pickens Jr. as Alvin Kersh; Mimi Rogers as Diana Fowley; William B. Davis as The Smoking Man; Chris Owens as Jeffrey Spender; Jeff Gulka as Gibson Praise; Don S. Williams as First Elder; George Murdock as Second Elder; Wayne Alexander as G. Arnold; Wendie Malick as Assistant Director J. Maslin; Arthur Taxier as Assistant Director Bart; Rick Millikan as Sandy; Alan Henry Brown as Scientist; Christopher Neiman as Van Pool Scientist; Scott Eberlein as Black-Haired Man; Ralph Meyering as Surgeon; Benito Martinez as Orderly; Kim Robillard as Homer; Wayne Thomas Yorke as Power Plant Worker

Episode chronology
← Previous "The End"	Next → "Drive"

"The Beginning" is the first episode of the sixth season of the science fiction television series The X-Files. It premiered on the Fox network in the United States on November 8, 1998. The episode was written by Chris Carter, and directed by Kim Manners. It helps explore the series' overarching mythology. "The Beginning" earned a Nielsen household rating of 11.9, being watched by 20.34 million people in its initial broadcast. The episode received mixed reviews from television critics.

The show centers on FBI special agents Fox Mulder (David Duchovny) and Dana Scully (Gillian Anderson) who work on cases linked to the paranormal, called X-Files. Mulder is a believer in the paranormal, while the skeptical Scully has been assigned to debunk his work. In the episode, Mulder and Scully eagerly hunt for a deadly creature in the Arizona desert. What they find seems to support Mulder's revived belief in aliens, but is discredited when the agents are not reassigned to the now re-opened X-Files, with Jeffrey Spender (Chris Owens) and Diana Fowley (Mimi Rogers) taking over instead.

"The Beginning" was the first episode of the series to not be filmed in Vancouver, Canada, after production was moved to Los Angeles at the behest of lead actor David Duchovny. The episode follows directly from the 1998 feature film. The writers sought to bring back characters, such as Spender, Fowley, and Gibson Praise (Jeff Gulka) who had not been featured in the movie, but had played a pivotal role in the show's fifth season.

== Plot ==
In Phoenix, Arizona, a scientist working for Roush Technologies is exposed to the black oil; an alien creature gestates and bursts from his body the next morning. A few hours after his death, a co-worker who arrives at his house is attacked and killed by the newborn alien.

In Washington, D.C., Agent Fox Mulder appears before an FBI panel regarding his experiences in Antarctica. Meanwhile, the Smoking Man (William B. Davis) reports to the Syndicate on the alien in Phoenix, confident that he'll be able to kill it. Assistant Director Walter Skinner tells Mulder, who is working on restoring the burned X-Files, that he and Scully have been denied reassignment on the unit, but that Mulder should seek out a folder left on the desk in his old office. Mulder goes there, only to discover that Jeffrey Spender and Diana Fowley have been assigned to the X-files. Feeling betrayed by Fowley, Mulder leaves, but not before stealthily taking the folder with him.

The Smoking Man seeks Gibson Praise, who is undergoing brain surgery at that very moment. Mulder and Scully head to the home where the alien gestated, finding an alien's nail in the wall. The Smoking Man arrives soon after with Gibson, who tells him that the alien is no longer there. At a nuclear power plant, the alien kills another person, but Mulder and Scully are denied access by Spender and Fowley. Upon returning to their car, they find a hiding Gibson, having escaped from the Smoking Man. Later that night, Fowley tells Mulder she was offered the X-files and is protecting his interests. Mulder leaves Gibson with Scully and heads off with her. Mulder and Fowley believe the alien is seeking heat, which is why it is at the power plant. Inside, they find organic material on the ground and cooling pipes.

Scully brings Gibson to a hospital, where it is determined that he has the alien virus in his blood. The Black-Haired Man (Scott Eberlein) kidnaps him soon after and brings him to the power plant. They find the alien, who attacks the Black-Haired Man but not Gibson, as witnessed by Mulder from outside a locked door. Afterward, Mulder and Scully are ordered to not associate with the X-files and are reassigned under Assistant Director Alvin Kersh. Spender is visited by the Smoking Man in his office. Mulder continues to work on restoring the X-Files and is told by Scully that Fowley's report does not reflect what really happened. She reveals that the alien virus DNA is also part of all human DNA, but in Gibson, the DNA is active. Meanwhile, at the power plant, Gibson is trapped inside with the alien, which sheds its skin inside a spent fuel pool, revealing the traditional grey alien form.

== Production ==
=== Pre-production ===
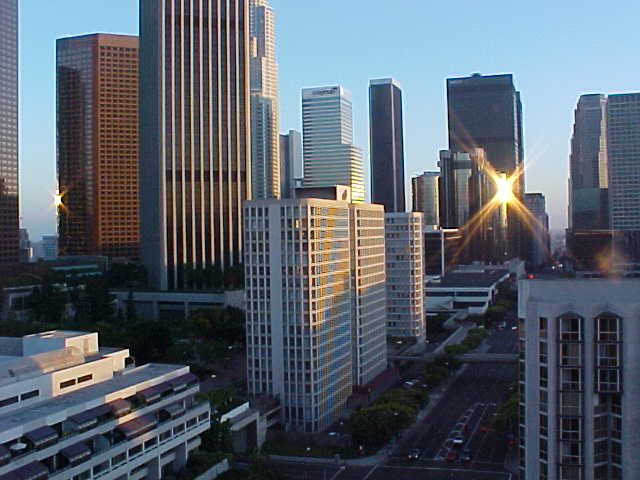
"The Beginning" was the first episode of The X-Files to be filmed in Los Angeles, California.

"The Beginning" was the first episode of the series to be filmed in Los Angeles, California. The move was instigated by David Duchovny, who portrayed Mulder, in order to increase his opportunity to find movie work as well as to give him a chance to be nearer to his wife, Téa Leoni. Series creator Chris Carter opposed the move; others, like series director Kim Manners and Gillian Anderson supported the move but were less vocal than Duchovny. Fox network officials eventually made the decision to film in California. According to Andy Meisler, "The very first shot of the season a long look directly into a bright sun shining on a barren desert was designed to boldly announce the show's arrival in Southern California." As a result of the move, the episode featured a largely new group of crew members, hired by Carter, Frank Spotnitz and new co-executive producer Michael Watkins; this necessitated the show's new crewmembers spending five weeks, receiving, unpacking, and cataloging filming material from their Vancouver counterparts.

Because of the shift from Vancouver to Los Angeles, some fans of the series were alienated. Many accused the show of "Hollywood-izing" the series by adding notable guest stars as well as making the plots simpler and more enjoyable for larger audiences. According to Space.com, a number of fans of the show specifically loved "the moody ambiance filming around Vancouver lent the series" during the first five seasons, which the sixth season reportedly lacked.

=== Writing and filming ===
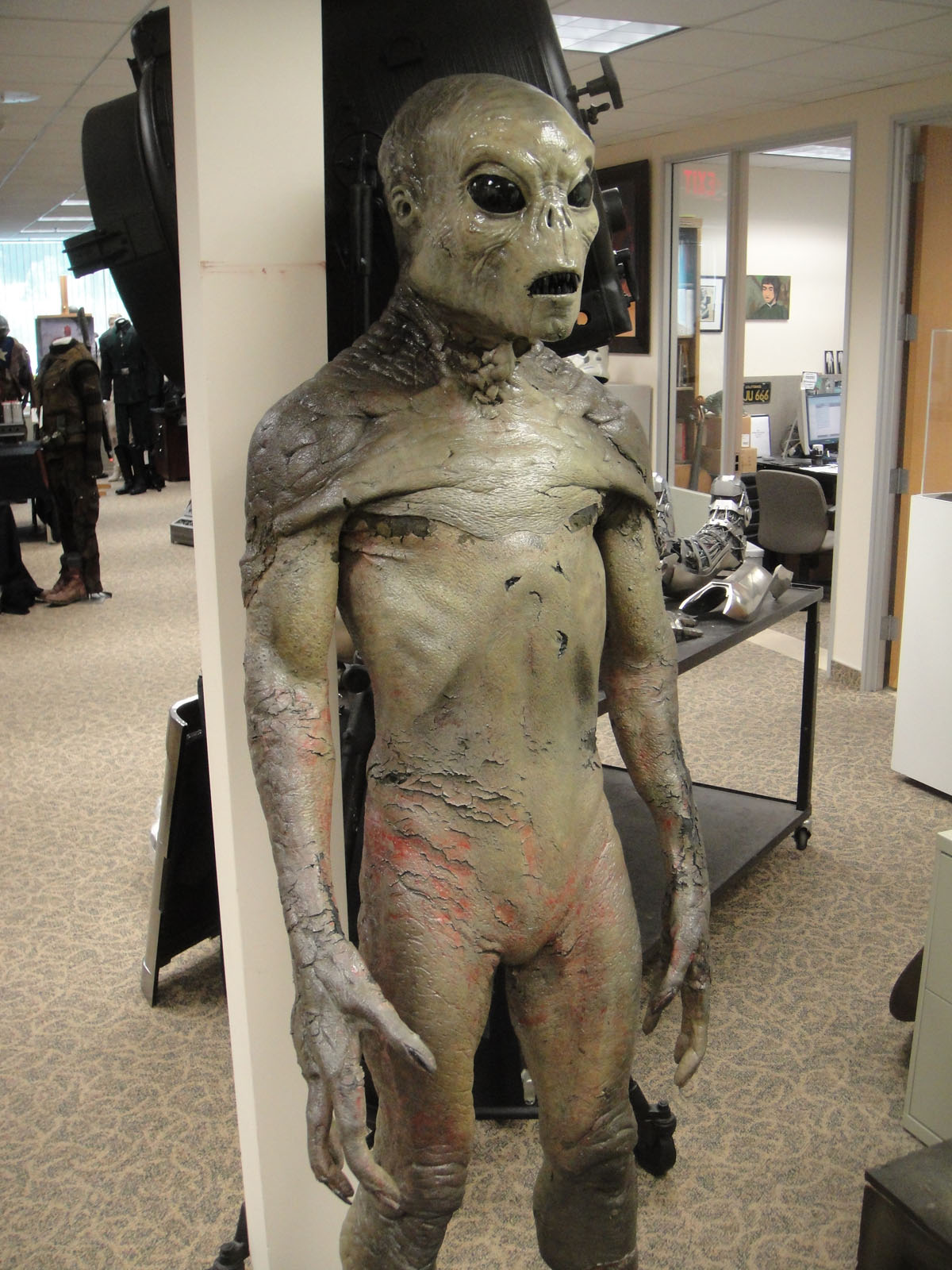
"The Beginning" featured the return of the newborn alien, as featured in The X-Files movie.

Spotnitz said that the hardest part about writing "The Beginning" was the task of not only segueing from a movie but also tying the story into the previous season finale. To accomplish this delicate task, the writers brought back characters like Gibson Praise, Diana Fowley and Jeffrey Spender (none of whom were in the film), as well as those that had been introduced in the film, like the alien. Carter claims to have thought of the episode's rough plot almost two years prior, when he was developing the plot of The X-Files movie.

The character Sandy, who is killed in the teaser sequence, was played by the show's casting director Rick Millikan at the request of Carter. Millikan later joked that he spent most of the shoot on the phone casting others for future X-Files episodes. One of the nuclear power plant workers is named Homer, a reference to Homer Simpson, one of the main characters from the animated Fox television series The Simpsons.

The scenes in an Arizona suburb were filmed in Valencia, California, because the producers wanted "something really Edward Scissorhands." The scenes set in the nuclear power plant were filmed in a Long Beach, California-based building owned by the electricity supply company Southern California Edison. Due to a heat wave, many of the scenes were filmed "in temperatures well above one hundred degrees", and some lines had to be re-recorded in the studio due to excessive background noise. The scenes of the alien molting in the power plant's spent fuel pool were filmed in a tank of water located in Marina del Rey, California that was frequently used by the producers of the show Baywatch. Filming the plant scenes proved to be troublesome, and many shots needed to be filmed multiple times due to prop and set issues. These problems persisted into post-production, and some scenes were not finalized until the end of October—nearly two months after principal filming ended.

== Broadcast and reception ==
"The Beginning" first aired in the United States on November 8, 1998. The episode earned a Nielsen rating of 11.9, with a 17 share, meaning that roughly 11.9 percent of all television-equipped households, and 17 percent of households watching television, were tuned in to the episode. It was viewed by 20.34 million viewers and was the second highest rated episode of the sixth season. The episode aired in the United Kingdom and Ireland on Sky1 on March 7, 1999, and received 1.08 million viewers, making it the second most watched episode that week. The episode was later included on The X-Files Mythology, Volume 3 – Colonization, a DVD collection that contains episodes involved with the alien Colonist's plans to take over the earth.

Critical reception to the episode was divided, as reviews ranged from largely positive to negative. In the book The End and the Beginning: The Official Guide to The X-Files, Vol. 5, author Andy Meisler wrote that some fans and critics responded positively to "The Beginning," most notably because the episode functioned as "a particularly artful and effective way to launch the series's new season—and era." Tom Kessenich, in his book Examination: An Unauthorized Look at Seasons 6–9 of the X-Files wrote positively of the episode, saying "'The Beginning' was a pretty good premiere episode. I was quite pleased to see how Chris Carter took last season's finale and the movie and tied things together to get Season 6 off to a fresh start." Emily VanDerWerff from The A.V. Club gave it a B. She praised the performance of Chris Owens, saying that he was "acting the shit out of Spender". Despite this, however she called the episode "lackluster" and wrote that it "isn’t a great episode of the show, but it works well enough". VanDerWerff's main issue with the entry was that it chose to wrap up the plot thread left dangling with the fifth-season finale, but did little to expand upon the revelations of the series' feature film. VanDerWerff also criticized the fact that Scully was, once again, a skeptic of the paranormal after all she saw.

Not all reviews were positive, however. Robert Shearman, in his book Wanting to Believe: A Critical Guide to The X-Files, Millennium & The Lone Gunmen, rated the episode one star out of five, writing that "'The Beginning' opens witty enough [...] and then offers the viewer no substance. It's a better season opener than 'Redux' [...] but it's still very poor." Paula Vitaris from Cinefantastique gave the episode a largely negative review and awarded it one-and-a-half stars out of four. She derided the episode's plot, saying that the episode was "another mile down the X-Files Road of Mythology. Monster aliens? This is something out of a schlocky pulp novel with the science of the show dissolved into complete technobabble".

== Bibliography ==
- Hurwitz, Matt; Knowles, Chris (2008). The Complete X-Files. Insight Editions. ISBN 978-1-933784-80-9.
- Kessenich, Tom (2002). Examination: An Unauthorized Look at Seasons 6–9 of the X-Files. Trafford Publishing. ISBN 1-55369-812-6.
- Meisler, Andy (2000). The End and the Beginning: The Official Guide to the X-Files Season 6. HarperCollins. ISBN 0-06-107595-7.
- Shearman, Robert (2009). Wanting to Believe: A Critical Guide to The X-Files, Millennium & The Lone Gunmen. Mad Norwegian Press. ISBN 978-0-9759446-9-1.
