= Daniel von Bargen =

American actor (1950–2015)

- Daniel von Bargen as Commandant Edwin Spangler in Malcolm in the Middle
- Born: June 5, 1950; Cincinnati, Ohio, U.S.
- Died: March 1, 2015 (aged 64); Montgomery, Ohio, U.S.
- Occupations: Actor; comedian
- Years active: 1970–2009
- Spouse: Margo Skinner (div. 1987)

Daniel von Bargen (June 5, 1950 – March 1, 2015) was an American character actor of film, stage and television. He was known for his roles as Mr. Kruger on Seinfeld (1997–1998), Commandant Edwin Spangler on Malcolm in the Middle (2000–2002), and Chief Grady in Super Troopers (2001).

== Early life ==
Von Bargen was born to Juanita J. (née Bustle) and Donald L. von Bargen, and was of German and English descent. He was born in Cincinnati, where he grew up for most of his childhood before moving with his family to Southern California. In 1968, von Bargen graduated from Reading High School. He graduated from Purdue University in Indiana.

== Career ==
In 1974, von Bargen made his television debut in Feasting with Panthers, a play about Oscar Wilde's imprisonment at the Reading Gaol, on PBS's Great Performances anthology series.

Von Bargen's film credits included The Silence of the Lambs, London Betty, RoboCop 3, Basic Instinct, Broken Arrow, Truman, The Majestic, Philadelphia, O Brother, Where Art Thou?, Snow Falling on Cedars, Thinner, A Civil Action, Disney's The Kid, Super Troopers and Universal Soldier: The Return.

Von Bargen played the maniacal sorcerer Nix in Clive Barker's Lord of Illusions and the Sheriff in The Postman. He played a terrorist in a season 5 episode of The X-Files. Von Bargen had played Mr. Kruger, George Costanza's boss, in the ninth season of Seinfeld, and also played the recurring antagonist Edwin Spangler, the eye patch wearing Commandant in charge of Marlin Academy who would always clash with Francis, in the Fox comedy Malcolm in the Middle for the first three seasons.

Von Bargen's stage career included a long residency with Trinity Repertory Company in Providence, Rhode Island. He made his Off-Broadway debut in 1981 in Missing Persons. He also appeared in the debut of Larry Gelbart's Mastergate and other plays at the American Repertory Theater in Cambridge, Massachusetts. He made his Broadway debut when the show went to New York City. In 1990, he won a Theatre World Award for Outstanding New Performer for his role in Mastergate. His last film roles were as George Burgess in Things That Hang from Trees and Maury in London Betty.

In 1993, von Bargen narrated the unabridged Streets of Laredo audiobook.

== Personal life ==
Von Bargen married actress Margo Skinner in the mid-1970s, and they moved to New York in 1980. Their marriage ended in divorce in 1987.

== Health issues and death ==
On February 20, 2012, von Bargen shot himself in the temple in an apparent suicide attempt. He managed to call 911, and an ambulance was dispatched to his apartment in Montgomery, Ohio. He suffered from diabetes and had previously had a leg amputated. When calling 911, he told the operator that he was scheduled to have two of his remaining toes amputated but did not want to undergo another surgery. "I have no children and no life, and I'm tired," he said. Von Bargen played fewer and fewer roles as his diabetes worsened. His last role was in the comedy London Betty in 2009.

Von Bargen died on March 1, 2015, of undisclosed causes at 64 years old. The Washington Post reported that his death "came after an unspecified long illness."

== Filmography ==
=== Television ===
Year	Title	Role	Notes
1974	Great Performances	Wooldridge	Episode: "Feasting with Panthers"
1976	Visions	Guard	Episode: "Life Among the Lowly"
1979	The Scarlet Letter	Sailor	Unknown episodes
1983	The Dean of Thin Air	George Berkeley	TV movie
1985	Right to Kill?	Detective Roberts	TV movie
1985	American Playhouse	Thomas	Episode: "Three Sovereigns for Sarah: Part I"
1985–1986	Spenser: For Hire	Al / Mr. Hurley	2 episodes
1990	H.E.L.P.	Whitehall	Episode: "Are You There, Alpha Centauri?"
1991–2004	Law & Order	Superintendent Cooper / Commander Billings / Lambrusco	3 episodes
1992	Citizen Cohn	Clyde Tolson	TV movie
1993	The Last Hit	Nordlinger	TV movie
1993	The Good Policeman	Frederic LeComte	TV movie
1993	With Hostile Intent	Officer Ted Campbell	TV movie
1993	Scam	Albert Magliocco	TV movie
1993	Guiding Light	Joe Morrison	Unknown episodes
1994	One West Waikiki	Captain Charlie Dalton	Episode: "'Til Death Do Us Part"
1994	The Gift of Love	Mr. Brady	TV movie
1994–1995	All My Children	Lieutenant Cody	Unknown episodes
1995	The Shamrock Conspiracy	Sternhardt	TV movie
1995	Truman	General Douglas MacArthur	TV movie
1995–1997	New York Undercover	Green / Omega Bomber / Duane	2 episodes
1996	The Writing on the Wall	Rockwell	TV movie
1996	NYPD Blue	Sergeant Ray Kahlins	2 episodes
1997–1998	Seinfeld	Mr. Kruger	4 episodes
1998	The Pretender	Captain Prentiss McClaren	Episode: "Collateral Damage"
1998	Significant Others	David Lerner	Episode: "The Plan"
1998	The X-Files	Jacob Steven Haley	Episode: "The Pine Bluff Variant"
1998	Arliss		Episode: "Whatever It Takes"
1998	Party of Five	Dr. Dick Grayson	Episode: "Love and War"
1999	Fantasy Island	District Attorney Flynn	Episode: "Innocent"
1999	The Practice	Detective Smiley	Episode: "Happily Ever After"
2000	City of Angels	Stewart Rafferty	Episode: "Unhand Me"
2000	Time of Your Life	Mr. Halloway	Episode: "The Time They Got E-Rotic"
2000	The Fearing Mind	P.F. O'Horgan	Episode: "Good Harvest"
2000	The West Wing	Air Force General Ken Shannon	2 episodes
2000–02	Malcolm in the Middle	Commandant Edwin Spangler	15 episodes (Seasons 1–3)
2001	Ally McBeal	Judge William Kopesky	Episode: "The Ex-Files"
2001	Judging Amy	Judge	Episode: "Grounded"
2003	Without a Trace	Chief Patrick Finn	Episode: "Trip Box"

=== Film ===
Year	Title	Role	Notes
1991	The Silence of the Lambs	SWAT Communicator	
1991	Company Business	Mike Flinn	
1991	Shadows and Fog	Hacker's Vigilante #4	
1992	Complex World	Malcom	
1992	Basic Instinct	Lieutenant Nilsen	
1993	RoboCop 3	Moreno	
1993	Rising Sun	Chief Olson / Interrogator	
1993	The Saint of Fort Washington	Boat Captain	
1993	Six Degrees of Separation	Detective	
1993	Philadelphia	Jury Foreman	
1994	I.Q.	Secret Service Agent	
1995	Crimson Tide	Vladimir Radchenko	
1995	Lord of Illusions	Nix	
1996	Looking for Richard	Ratcliffe	Documentary
1996	Broken Arrow	Air Force General Creely	
1996	Before and After	Police Chief Fran Conklin	
1996	Thinner	Chief Duncan Hopley	
1997	G.I. Jane	Secretary of the Navy Theodore Hayes	
1997	The Real Blonde	Devon	
1997	Trouble on the Corner	Cecil, The butcher	
1997	Amistad	Warden Pendleton	
1997	The Postman	Pineview Sheriff Briscoe	
1998	Desert Blue	Sheriff Jackson	
1998	I'm Losing You	Dr. Litvak	
1998	Inferno	General Craig Maxwell	
1998	The Faculty	Mr. Tate	
1998	A Civil Action	Mr. Granger	
1999	The General's Daughter	Police Chief Yardley	
1999	Universal Soldier: The Return	General Radford	
1999	Snow Falling on Cedars	Carl Heine Sr.	
2000	A Question of Faith	Adrian	
2000	O Brother, Where Art Thou?	Sheriff Cooley	
2000	Shaft	Lieutenant Kearney	
2000	Disney's The Kid	Sam Duritz	
2001	Super Troopers	Chief Bruce Grady	
2001	Trigger Happy	Harold	
2001	The Majestic	Federal Agent Ellerby	
2002	Coastlines	Sheriff Tate	
2002	Simone	Chief Detective	
2003	Artworks	Howard Deardorf	
2004	Dead Horse	Stu Conklin	
2005	Drip	Daniel	
2006	Things That Hang from Trees	George Burgess	
2009	London Betty	Maury	(final film role)

=== Stage ===
Year	Title	Role	Venue
1981	Missing Persons	Tucker	
1986	Good by C. P. Taylor	John Halder (lead)	Dallas Theater Three
1987	Uncle Vanya	Vanya	Hasty Pudding Theater
1988	Platonov	Pavel Petrovich Scherbuk	
1988	Life is a Dream	King Basilio	
1988	Nobody	Carl	
1989	Mastergate	Maj. Manley Battle	American Repertory Theater
1990	Macbeth	Ross	Joseph Papp Public Theater
1991	Beggars in the House of Plenty	Pop	
1992	Angel of Death	Gunther Ludwig	American Jewish Theater
1993	The Treatment	Andrew	Joseph Papp Public Theater
2003	Secret Order	Robert Brock	Laguna Playhouse
	'Tis Pity She's a Whore		
	The Changeling		
