= Emile (film) =

- Movie poster featuring Ian McKellen
- Directed by: Carl Bessai
- Written by: Carl Bessai
- Produced by: Jonathan English; Bjorg Veland
- Starring: Ian McKellen; Deborah Kara Unger; Ian Tracey
- Cinematography: Carl Bessai
- Edited by: Julian Clarke
- Music by: Vincent Mai
- Distributed by: Les Films Séville (Canada); Redbus Film Distribution (United Kingdom)
- Release dates: September 6, 2003 (Toronto International Film Festival); September 4, 2004 (Canada); May 21, 2004 (United Kingdom)
- Running time: 95 minutes
- Countries: Canada; United Kingdom
- Language: English
- Budget: CAD 3,000,000

Emile is a Canadian film made in 2003 by Carl Bessai and released widely in 2004. The cast includes Ian McKellen and Deborah Kara Unger. The film received 2 Genie Award nominations in 2005 for Best Achievement in Overall Sound and Best Performance by an Actor in a Leading Role for Ian McKellen.

== Plot ==
As a young man, Emile went to England on a university scholarship, leaving behind his brutal older brother Carl and his creative younger brother Freddy to run the family farm in Saskatchewan. Despite promising Freddy that he would return, Emile stayed in England and became an academic, turning his back on his Canadian past and even acquiring an English accent, while his brothers died one after the other in tragic circumstances: Freddy gassing himself with exhaust fumes in his pick-up; Carl dying in a crash in the same pick-up.

On his brief return (presumably for Carl's funeral) the authorities think he is there to adopt Carl's young daughter Nadia, but he abandons her simply saying "single parent families are not allowed on campus". All he is there to do is to resolve the family land-holdings.

Invited many decades later to receive an honorary degree by a Canadian university, the retired Emile decides to take an extended visit to Victoria, British Columbia to try to get to know Carl's now adult daughter Nadia (Deborah Kara Unger, who also briefly portrays Carl's wife) who has recently separated from her husband, and her ten-year-old daughter Maria (Theo Crane, who also portrays the ten-year-old Nadia) before it is too late. The discovery of his ancient typewriter amongst Nadia's belongings triggers a series of reveries, half memory, half fantasy, in which Emile's unresolved feelings about the past come back to haunt him.

== Cast ==
- Ian McKellen as Emile (all ages)
- Deborah Kara Unger as adult Nadia and as Nadia's mother
- Theo Crane as Maria and as young Nadia
- Tygh Runyan as Freddy
- Chris William Martin as Carl
- Ian Tracey as Tom

== Placement in series ==
'Emile' is the third in a loose trilogy of films written and directed by Carl Bessai, all exploring aspects of personal identity. The first, 'Johnny', looked at a teenager with his life ahead of them, the second, 'Lola', portrayed a middle-aged woman trying to escape an abusive relationship, and 'Emile' is a Proustian examination of memory, imagination, regret, lost roots, and the possibility of redemption and reconciliation, all seen through the eyes of an old man whose life is almost over.

== Reception ==
The review aggregator website Rotten Tomatoes gives the film an approval rating of 57% based on 23 reviews, with an average rating of 5.8/10. The site's critical consensus reads, "Emile benefits from a typically outstanding Ian McKellen performance, but a frustratingly circuitous approach undercuts the effectiveness of a potentially affecting story." On Metacritic, the film has a weighted average score of 58 out of 100, based on 10 critics, indicating "mixed or average reviews".
