= The Game (1997 film) =

1997 film by David Fincher

- Theatrical release poster
- Directed by: David Fincher
- Written by: John Brancato; Michael Ferris
- Produced by: Steve Golin; Ceán Chaffin
- Starring: Michael Douglas; Sean Penn; James Rebhorn; Deborah Kara Unger; Peter Donat; Carroll Baker; Armin Mueller-Stahl
- Cinematography: Harris Savides
- Edited by: James Haygood
- Music by: Howard Shore
- Production company: Propaganda Films
- Distributed by: PolyGram Filmed Entertainment
- Release date: September 12, 1997
- Running time: 128 minutes
- Country: United States
- Language: English
- Budget: $70 million
- Box office: $109.4 million

The Game is a 1997 American mystery thriller film directed by David Fincher, starring Michael Douglas, Sean Penn, Deborah Kara Unger and James Rebhorn and produced by Propaganda Films and PolyGram Filmed Entertainment. It tells the story of a wealthy investment banker who is given a mysterious birthday gift by his brother—participation in a game that integrates in strange ways with his everyday life. As the lines between the banker's real life and the game become more uncertain, hints of a larger conspiracy unfold.

The Game was well received by critics like Roger Ebert and major periodicals like The New York Times, but had middling box-office returns compared to the success of Fincher's previous film Seven (1995). The film later gained a following among Fincher's fans, with some noting it as one of his best films.

== Plot ==
Nicholas Van Orton is a divorced investment banker in San Francisco. He is haunted by the death of his father, who committed suicide on his 48th birthday by jumping off the roof of the family mansion. For his 48th birthday, Nicholas's estranged younger brother, Conrad, gives him an unusual present: a voucher for a game offered by Consumer Recreation Services (CRS). Nicholas goes to the CRS office and takes a series of examinations. To his irritation, he is informed that his application has been rejected.

Nicholas returns home to find a wooden clown in his driveway. The news anchor talks to him through his TV screen, saying he is being watched by a camera in the clown's head, and gives him the number for a CRS 24-hour emergency hotline. He warns Nicholas not to call the hotline asking about the object of the game, as "figuring that out is the object".

Nicholas receives a note telling him to follow a waitress, Christine. When she helps a sick man in the street, they ride in the ambulance with him together. In the parking lot, the power is cut and everyone leaves suddenly. Nicholas and Christine escape the building and are chased by dogs through the streets. Afterwards, Christine tells Nicholas she was bribed to attract his attention.

A panic-stricken Conrad visits Nicholas and apologizes, claiming CRS has attacked him. When Conrad finds CRS keys in Nicholas's car, he accuses him of working for them and runs away. Nicholas abandons the car and gets in a taxi. The driver locks the doors, jumps out of the car and sends it into San Francisco Bay. Nicholas escapes using a tool left for him a day before. He goes to the police, but they find the CRS office abandoned.

Nicholas finds Christine's home and discovers everything in it is fabricated. When she tells him they are being watched, Nicholas attacks a camera and armed personnel swarm the house. Nicholas and Christine flee to a Van Orton home outside of the city. Christine tells Nicholas that CRS has drained his bank accounts by guessing his passwords using the psychological tests he completed, but when Nicholas calls his lawyer, he tells him his money is intact. Nicholas realizes Christine has drugged him. As he loses consciousness, she admits she is part of the scam and says he made a fatal mistake in giving his banking code over the phone.

Nicholas wakes entombed in a Mexican cemetery. He sells his watch to return to San Francisco, and finds his mansion foreclosed and most of his possessions removed. He contacts the hotel where Conrad was staying, and is told he has been committed to a psychiatric hospital. Nicholas retrieves a hidden gun from his home and finds his ex-wife to ask for help and apologize for his neglect. He recognizes Jim Feingold, the CRS employee who conducted his tests, in a television commercial and realizes he is an actor. He finds Jim and forces him to take him to the real CRS office. There, he takes Christine hostage, demanding to see the head of CRS.

Pursued by CRS guards, Nicholas takes Christine to the roof. Christine frantically tells him it is only a game: his finances are intact, and his family and friends are waiting on the other side of the door. When the door opens, Nicholas shoots the first person to emerge: Conrad, bearing a bottle of champagne. Nicholas tries to commit suicide by leaping off the roof, but lands on a giant air cushion in a banquet hall. He is greeted by Conrad and the rest of the actors from the game. Everything was staged for Nicholas's birthday present. After the party, Christine, whose real name is Claire, leaves for her next job and invites Nicholas for coffee at the airport.

== Cast ==
- Michael Douglas as Nicholas "Nick / Nicky" Van Orton
- Sean Penn as Conrad "Connie" Van Orton
- Deborah Kara Unger as Christine / Claire
- James Rebhorn as Jim Feingold
- Peter Donat as Samuel Sutherland
- Carroll Baker as Ilsa
- Armin Mueller-Stahl as Anson Baer
- Anna Katarina as Elizabeth
- Charles Martinet as Nicholas's father
- Mark Boone Junior as Shady Private Investigator
- Tommy Flanagan as Solicitor/Taxi Driver
- Spike Jonze as Airbag EMT Beltran
- Michael Massee as Airbag EMT Galliano
- Linda Manz as Amy
- Daniel Schorr as himself (newscaster)
- John Aprea as Power Executive
- Jack Kehoe as Lieutenant Sullivan
- Harrison Young as Obsequious Executive

== Production ==
=== Development ===
The Game was originally a spec screenplay written by John Brancato and Michael Ferris in 1991. It was sold to Metro-Goldwyn-Mayer (MGM) that year, but the project was put in turnaround and eventually picked up by Propaganda Films. Jonathan Mostow was attached to direct, with Kyle MacLachlan and Bridget Fonda cast in the lead roles. Principal photography was scheduled to start in February 1993, but in early 1992, the project was moved to PolyGram Filmed Entertainment, and Mostow dropped out as director but remained as an executive producer.

Producer Steve Golin bought the script from MGM and gave it to David Fincher, hoping he would direct. Fincher liked the plot twists but brought in Andrew Kevin Walker, who had worked with him on Seven, to make the character of Nicholas more cynical. Fincher and Walker spent six weeks changing the tone and trying to make the story work. More revisions were made to the script, including removing a scene where Nicholas kills Christine and then commits suicide, as Fincher felt that it did not make sense. In 1996, Larry Gross and Walker were brought in to make revisions to the script.

According to Fincher, there were three primary influences on The Game: Michael Douglas's character was a "fashionable, good-looking Scrooge, lured into a Mission: Impossible situation with a steroid shot in the thigh from The Sting". Fincher said: "Movies usually make a pact with the audience that says: we're going to play it straight. What we show you is going to add up. But we don't do that. In that respect, it's about movies and how movies dole out information." He said the film was about "loss of control. The purpose of The Game is to take your greatest fear, put it this close to your face and say 'There, you're still alive. It's all right.'"

=== Casting ===
Fincher had intended to make The Game before Seven, but when Brad Pitt became available for Seven, that project became the top priority. The success of Seven helped the producers of The Game get a larger budget. They approached Douglas to star in the film. He was hesitant at first because he was concerned that PolyGram was not a big enough company to distribute the film. However, once he was on board, Douglas's presence helped to get the film into production.

At the 1996 Cannes Film Festival, PolyGram announced that Jodie Foster would star in the film with Douglas. However, Fincher was uncomfortable with putting an actor and movie star of her stature in a supporting part. After talking to her, he considered rewriting the character of Conrad as Nicholas' daughter so that Foster could play that role. However, Douglas did not like the idea and requested that the character be changed to his sister, which Foster found peculiar as Douglas is almost 20 years her senior and appeared with her in Napoleon and Samantha when Foster was only 9 years old while Douglas was 28.

Due to differences in opinions and scheduling conflicts with Robert Zemeckis' Contact, Foster could not appear in the film. Once she left, the role of Conrad was offered to Jeff Bridges, but he declined, and Sean Penn was eventually cast. Later, Foster alleged that she and PolyGram had orally agreed that she would appear in the film, and when this did not transpire, she filed a $54.5 million lawsuit against PolyGram. Fincher and Foster would later work together in Panic Room (2002).

Deborah Kara Unger's audition for the role of Christine was a test reel consisting of a two-minute sex scene from David Cronenberg's Crash. Douglas initially thought it was a joke, but when he and Fincher met her in person, they were impressed by her acting.

=== Filming ===
Principal photography began on location in San Francisco in August 1996 despite studio pressure to shoot in Los Angeles, which was cheaper. Fincher also considered shooting in Chicago and Seattle, but Chicago had no mansions nearby, and Seattle did not have an adequate financial district. The script had been written with San Francisco in mind, and he liked the financial district's "old money, Wall Street vibe". However, that area of the city was very busy and hard to move around in. The production shot on weekends to have more control. Fincher used old stone buildings, small streets, and the city's hills to represent the class system pictorially. To convey the old money world, he set many scenes in restaurants with hardwood paneling and red leather. Some of the locations used in the film included Golden Gate Park, the Presidio of San Francisco, and the historic Filoli Mansion, which is 40 kilometres (25 mi) south of San Francisco in Woodside, California and stood in for the Van Orton mansion.

For the visual look of Nicholas' wealthy lifestyle, Fincher and the film's cinematographer Harris Savides wanted to create a "rich and supple" feel, drawing inspiration from films like The Godfather, which featured visually appealing locations with ominous undertones. Once Nicholas left his protected world, Fincher and Savides let fluorescents, neon signs, and other background lights become overexposed to let "things get a bit wilder out in the real world." For The Game, Fincher used a Technicolor printing process called ENR, which gave the night sequences a smoother look. The challenge for him was to determine how much deception the audience could handle and whether they would "go for 45 minutes of red herrings". To address this, he staged scenes as simply as possible and used a single camera because "with multiple cameras, you run the risk of boring people with coverage".

Principal photography lasted 100 days, with much of the shooting done at night at various locations. The scene in which Nicholas' taxi drives into the San Francisco Bay was shot near the Embarcadero. The close-up of Douglas trapped in the back seat was filmed on a soundstage at Sony Pictures Studios in a large water tank. Douglas was in a small compartment that was designed to resemble the backseat of a taxi, with three cameras capturing the action.

== Release ==
The Game was released on September 12, 1997, in 2,403 theaters, and grossed $14.3 million during its opening weekend. It went on to make $48.3 million in North America and $61.1 million in the rest of the world, for a worldwide total of $109.4 million.

The Criterion Collection released The Game on Laserdisc in 1997, with exclusive features including an alternate ending and an audio commentary featuring director David Fincher, actor Michael Douglas, screenwriters John Brancato and Michael Ferris, cinematographer Harris Savides, production designer Jeffrey Beecroft, and visual effects supervisor Kevin Haug. It was released on DVD by Universal Pictures in 2002. In 2007, Universal released the film in the U.S. on HD DVD and on Blu-ray in some foreign markets. On September 18, 2012, it was reissued by Criterion on DVD and Blu-ray.

== Reception ==
=== Critical response ===
Rotten Tomatoes reports an approval rating of 77% based on 64 reviews, with an average rating of 7.40/10. The website's critics consensus reads: "The ending could use a little work but this is otherwise another sterling example of David Fincher's iron grip on atmosphere and storytelling." Metacritic gives the film a weighted average score of 63 out of 100 based on 19 critics, indicating "generally favorable reviews". Audiences polled by CinemaScore gave the film an average grade of "B−" on an A+ to F scale.

Roger Ebert of the Chicago Sun-Times gave the film three and a half stars out of four, praising Douglas as "the right actor for the role. He can play smart, he can play cold, and he can play angry. He is also subtle enough that he never arrives at an emotional plateau before the film does, and never overplays the process of his inner change." In her review for The New York Times, Janet Maslin wrote, "Mr. Fincher, like Michael Douglas in the film's leading role, does show real finesse in playing to the paranoia of these times."

Time magazine's Richard Corliss wrote, "Fincher's style is so handsomely oppressive, and Douglas' befuddlement is so cagey, that for a while, the film recalls smarter excursions into heroic paranoia (The Parallax View, Total Recall)." In his review for The Washington Post, Desson Howe wrote, "It's formulaic, yet edgy. It's predictable, yet full of surprises. How far you get through this tall tale of a thriller before you give up and howl is a matter of personal taste. But there's much pleasure in Fincher's intricate color schemes, his rich sense of decor, his ability to sustain suspense over long periods of time and his sense of humor." Entertainment Weekly gave the film a "B+" rating, and Owen Gleiberman wrote, "Emotionally, there's not much at stake in The Game—can Nicholas Van Orton be saved?!—but Douglas is the perfect actor to occupy the center of a crazed Rube Goldberg thriller. The movie has the wit to be playful about its own manipulations, even as it exploits them for maximum pulp impact."

In his review for the San Francisco Chronicle, Mick LaSalle wrote, "At times The Game is frustrating to watch, but that's just a measure of how well Fincher succeeds in putting us in his hero's shoes." However, Rolling Stone magazine's Peter Travers felt that "Fincher's effort to cover up the plot holes is all the more noticeable for being strained... The Game has a sunny, redemptive side that ill suits Fincher and ill serves audiences that share his former affinity for loose ends hauntingly left untied."

=== In retrospect ===
In retrospect, Michael Douglas said:

I think what I'm most proud about is that it's one of the very few movies that you could not guess the ending. That's why I'm such a big sports fan, with sports you can never guess what's gonna happen. Most movies you get halfway through and you can kind of guess the ending. The Game you could never figure out what the ending was gonna be. David Fincher is a very talented filmmaker. It was an extremely tough shoot, it was very long, a lot of nights. I thought it was a really well-made picture, very unpredictable and I do hear that picture when I talk about movies that I've made that people liked a lot.

Fincher later said he was not proud of the film. He said he discusses his projects with his wife, the producer Ceán Chaffin:

She was extremely vociferous, for instance, when she said, "Don't make The Game" and in hindsight, my wife was right. We didn't figure out the third act, and it was my fault, because I thought if you could just keep your foot on the throttle it would be liberating and funny.

=== Literary assessment ===
In the film notes of the Criterion edition, the director was referred to as incorporating elements of the writings of Franz Kafka, stating:

Echoes of Franz Kafka are hard to miss in Nicholas's plight—like Josef K. in The Trial, he's caught in a series of senseless ordeals controlled by faceless people he can't understand—and viewers may also think of Thomas Pynchon when it starts to appear that the conspiracy against Nicholas includes everyone in the story except him. Fincher himself has described The Game as a postmodern version of A Christmas Carol, with Nicholas as a Scrooge-like emotional miser who regains his soul after passing through a whirlwind of life-changing encounters.

=== Accolades ===
A sequence from the film deemed to be the most thrilling was ranked no. 44 on Bravo's The 100 Scariest Movie Moments.

== See also ==
- The Man Who Knew Too Little (1997)
- Alternate reality game
- Birthday effect
- Simulacrum
- Twist ending
