= Folie à Deux (The X-Files) =

- The X-Files episode
- Walter Skinner is nearly attacked by Pincus in his true form. Many members of the production staff derided the look of the monster's costume.
- Episode no.: Season 5 Episode 19
- Directed by: Kim Manners
- Written by: Vince Gilligan
- Production code: 5X19
- Original air date: May 10, 1998
- Running time: 45 minutes

Guest appearances
- Mitch Pileggi as Walter Skinner; Brian Markinson as Gary Lambert; John Apicella as Greg Pincus; Cynthia Preston as Nancy Aaronson; Roger Cross as Agent Rice; Owen Walstrom as Mark Backus; Dmitry Chepovetsky as Supervisor; Leslie Jones as Gretchen Starns; Nancy Kerr as Nurse; Brenda McDonald as Mrs. Loach

Episode chronology
← Previous "The Pine Bluff Variant"	Next → "The End"
- The X-Files season 5

"Folie à Deux" is the nineteenth episode of the fifth season of American science fiction television series The X-Files. It was written by Vince Gilligan and directed by Kim Manners. The episode originally aired on May 10, 1998, in the United States on the Fox network. The episode is a "Monster-of-the-Week" story, a stand-alone plot which is unconnected to the series' wider mythology, or fictional history. The episode earned a Nielsen household rating of 11.0, being watched by 17.63 million viewers upon its initial broadcast. It received largely positive reviews from critics.

The show centers on FBI special agents Fox Mulder (David Duchovny) and Dana Scully (Gillian Anderson) who work on cases linked to the paranormal, called X-Files.

In this episode, Mulder encounters a delusional man, Gary Lambert (Brian Markinson), who believes his boss, Greg Pincus (John Apicella), may be a monster—and decides to take an entire office building, including Mulder, hostage to prove it. Lambert is eventually killed, but somehow, Mulder inherits his ability to see Pincus as a monster. After Mulder claims that Pincus is a monster, he is locked in a psychiatric hospital, only to be saved by Scully, the only person who believes him.

The episode's antagonistic bug creature was created by means of a prosthetic suit that was worn by a stuntwoman. The suit was highly ridiculed behind the scenes. To fix the perceived issues with the monster, the production team gave the film to visual effects editor Laurie Kallsen-George, who digitally altered the footage until it was deemed suitable. The episode's title is a reference to Folie à deux, a form of insanity shared by two people. It usually begins with one person who conceives of a delusional belief and then spreads it to another; thus, those two share the same delusion.

== Plot ==
In Oak Brook, Illinois, Gary Lambert (Brian Markinson), a telemarketer at a company called VinylRight, believes that his seemingly normal boss, Greg Pincus (John Apicella), is an insect-like monster that only he can see in its true form.

Walter Skinner (Mitch Pileggi) orders Fox Mulder (David Duchovny) and Dana Scully (Gillian Anderson) to go to Chicago to do a threat assessment of a taped manifesto that mentions VinylRight, which has seen a violent incident at its Kansas City offices. Mulder suspects that the case is a deliberate waste of time and tells Scully not to accompany him. During his meeting with Pincus, Mulder learns that the tape was sent to a local radio station with a demand that it be played twenty-four hours a day; on the tape, a man—revealed to be Lambert—claims that a monster "hides in the light" and stalks employees at VinylRight. Mulder calls Scully and asks her to find past X-Files containing the phrase.

After one of Lambert's co-workers, Nancy Aaronson (Cynthia Preston), is turned into a living corpse by Pincus—while appearing normal to everyone else—Lambert flees to his apartment and arms himself with an assault rifle. Meanwhile, Scully calls Mulder to tell him that she found the phrase "hiding in the light" in a 1992 case from Lakeland, Florida, that involved similar accusations of hidden monsters. Mulder admits that Scully should come to Chicago to help him with the investigation. He returns to the VinylRight office and unwittingly walks into the middle of a hostage situation, being held captive by Lambert along with Pincus and the other employees.

As Scully arrives on the scene, Lambert divides his hostages into "real people" and "monsters", claiming that Pincus has turned several employees into zombies. Lambert shoots Mark Backus, one of the purported zombies, when he tries to disarm him while briefly distracted by Mulder. When Lambert demands a camera to broadcast his warning, Scully arranges for a SWAT officer disguised as a cameraman to be sent in the building. Lambert, not knowing that the camera broadcasts only in a closed circuit, accuses Pincus of being a monster. As the lights are cut, Lambert forces Mulder to look behind him and see that Pincus, for an instant, is a large insect. Just then, the FBI smashes into the room with an armored vehicle and kills Lambert before he can open fire.

Mulder questions Pincus and learns that he was present during the VinylRight incidents in Kansas City and Florida. At his office, Mulder maps out all the reports of monsters "hiding in the light" against places Pincus has lived and worked. He tries to convince Scully that Lambert might have been right, but she believes he is succumbing to a folie à deux, or shared psychosis, with Lambert. Mulder asks Scully to do an autopsy of Backus to see if there is any evidence of Lambert's claims, but Scully refuses.

In an effort to prove Lambert right, Mulder goes to his home with an Agent Rice. There, Mulder finds a map of Pincus' movements and incidents of reported monsters, like the map Mulder made. Looking out a window, Mulder sees the zombified Nancy watching him. He runs outside to confront her, but she drives away in a car with Pincus. Meanwhile, Skinner asks Scully why Mulder returned to Chicago. She covers for him and finds herself committed to performing Backus's autopsy. She hands over the operation to her assistant, who observes that the body has been dead for between 48 and 72 hours, not the 24 hours since the shooting.

Back in Oak Brook, Mulder follows Pincus to the house of VinylRight employee Gretchen Starns. He looks through the window and sees the monster leaning over the woman as she watches TV. Breaking into the house, Mulder sees that Starns has been transformed into a zombie. Behind him, out of his sight, the monster walks across the ceiling. Mulder catches a glimpse of it crawling up the outside of the house. Later, Pincus and Starns complain to Skinner about Mulder's behavior. Mulder, seeing Pincus begin to transform into the creature again, draws his weapon. He is restrained by a disbelieving Skinner and then sedated in a hospital.

Mulder tells Scully that he saw the monster doing something to the back of his victim's head, begging her to look for similar evidence on Backus's body. Scully finds three puncture marks at the top of Backus's spine, marking the corners of an equilateral triangle. Meanwhile, Mulder, still restrained in his bed at the hospital, sees the silhouette of the monster at the window. He screams for the nurse, but she has already been bitten and opens the window to let the monster in. Scully tries to visit Mulder, but the nurse refuses access. Scully suddenly sees the nurse as a corpse, realizing that Mulder is in danger. Running into Mulder's room, she sees and shoots at the monster. It leaps through the partially open window, breaking the glass and wooden frame.

Scully testifies to Skinner that she believes Mulder is mentally sound and fit for duty, noting the intruder in Mulder's room, a chemical found in Backus's body, and the fact that Pincus and several others mysteriously disappeared. Afterward she tells Mulder that she said it was folie à deux, and describes it as 'a madness shared by two'. But she does not specify who the two were. Meanwhile, a different worker at a telemarketing agency in Camdenton, Missouri, notices the same ominous signs of the creature.

== Production ==
=== Writing and effects ===
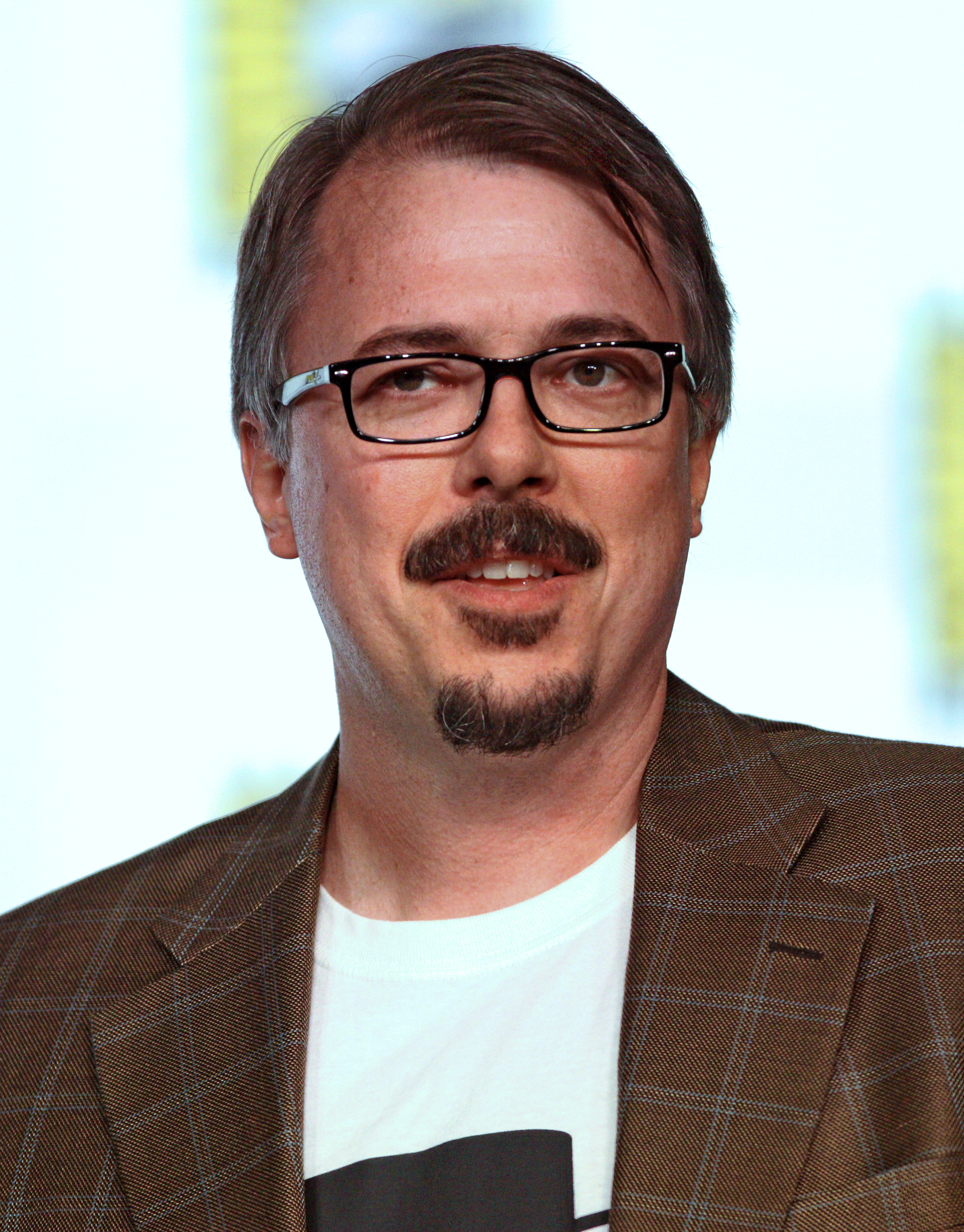
The episode was written by Vince Gilligan.

"Folie à Deux" was written by Vince Gilligan, who was inspired by the idea that "there's a monster around that only you can see—the clinical definition of madness". The title is a reference to Folie à deux (French for "madness of two"), a psychiatric syndrome in which symptoms of a delusional belief and sometimes hallucinations are transmitted from one individual to another.

The episode's bug antagonist was actually a prosthetic suit worn by a stuntwoman. The suit was highly ridiculed behind the scenes; reportedly, actor Markinson, upon seeing the costume, said "This is what's driving me crazy?" Director Kim Manners too thought the costume was ridiculous and sardonically told people that the episode would ruin his career. Gilligan attributed the problems due to the episodic work schedule, he noted, "We're usually on such a short schedule that there has to be a weak link somewhere". Gilligan also stated that the "overengineered" aspects of the suit made it somewhat comical. To fix the perceived issues with the monster, the production team gave the filmed footage to visual effects editor Laurie Kallsen-George, who "took the footage with the monster in it, erased the monster completely, took the monster to a different screen [...] animated it, and added speed blur". These effects were time-consuming and were only finished the day the episode aired. In the finished episode, the monster is not clearly visible, which allowed the scariness of the episode to be more real. Gilligan approved of Kallsen-George's work, saying, "There's a long noble history to [obscuring the monster]. The truth is your imagination can be much more effective than real life."

=== Locations ===
Initially, the producers wanted to set the Gretchen Starns' house scenes at a tract home, to recall the "pastel community" featured in movies like Edward Scissorhands (1990) and The Truman Show (1998). However, when the production crew located a suitable tract home, it was not nearly as "spook[y]" as they were hoping, and so they ended up shooting most of these scenes in a "turn-of-the-century" house located in North Vancouver, British Columbia. Special effect rigging was installed on the house to allow the bug creature to scale the wall. The elaborate sequence in which the insect creature crawls across a ceiling was made by erecting an upside-down house set on a soundstage. The stuntwoman portraying the bug then crawled across the set and the footage was flipped in post-production. The scenes featuring an armored car smashing through the wall of VinylRight were also filmed on a specially constructed soundstage.

== Reception ==
=== Ratings ===
"Folie à Deux" originally aired on the Fox network on May 10, 1998, and was first broadcast in the United Kingdom on BBC One on March 10, 1999. This episode earned a Nielsen household rating of 11.0, with a 17 share, meaning that roughly 11.0 percent of all television-equipped households, and 17 percent of households watching television, were tuned in to the episode. It was viewed by 17.63 million viewers.

=== Reviews ===
"Folie à Deux" received largely positive reviews from critics. Francis Dass of New Straits Times was positive toward the episode, considering it "highly watchable". Emily St. James of The A.V. Club gave the episode a glowing review and awarded it an "A". She praised the way it "starts out as what seems like a Mulder-centric episode, then slowly inverts on itself to become a Scully-centric episode". St. James also positively critiqued the manner in which "the monster [...] works on a metaphorical level as well". She concluded that the episode's main theme—that "[m]adness is always better when shared by two"—was a "great idea" that resulted in "one of the greatest episodes the show ever did".

Paula Vitaris from Cinefantastique gave the episode a largely positive review and awarded it three stars out of four. Vitaris praised the concept and called the episode "the scariest [...] of the year". She applauded the "now you see it, now you don't" appearance of the bug creature and noted that Pincus' casting was "just right". She concluded that the episode was "so well realized" and that "there is so much to enjoy". Robert Shearman and Lars Pearson, in their book Wanting to Believe: A Critical Guide to The X-Files, Millennium & The Lone Gunmen, rated the episode four stars out of five. The two compared the entry to the previous fifth season installment "Bad Blood", calling "Folie à Deux" its "logical extension". Shearman and Pearson argued that the episode "provide[s] a comedy and an effective monster story at the same time."

== Bibliography ==
- Gradnitzer, Louisa; Pittson, Todd (1999). X marks the spot: on location with the X-files. Arsenal Pulp Press. ISBN 1-55152-066-4.
- Hurwitz, Matt; Knowles, Chris (2008). The Complete X-Files: Behind the Series the Myths and the Movies. New York, US: Insight Editions. ISBN 978-1933784724.
- Meisler, Andy (1999), Resist or Serve: The Official Guide to The X-Files, Vol. 4, London: HarperCollins, ISBN 0-00-257133-1
- Shearman, Robert; Pearson, Lars (2009). Wanting to Believe: A Critical Guide to The X-Files, Millennium & The Lone Gunmen. Mad Norwegian Press. ISBN 978-0975944691.
