= Paranoia 1.0 =

Paranoia 1.0 (One Point O)
- Theatrical poster
- Directed by: Jeff Renfroe; Marteinn Thorsson
- Written by: Jeff Renfroe; Marteinn Thorsson
- Produced by: Chris Sievernich; R.D. Robb; Kyle Gates; Thomas Mai
- Starring: Jeremy Sisto; Deborah Kara Unger; Udo Kier; Bruce Payne; Lance Henriksen
- Cinematography: Christopher Soos
- Edited by: Daniel Sadler; Troy Takaki
- Music by: Terry Huud
- Distributed by: Armada Pictures International
- Release date: January 2004 (Sundance)
- Running time: 92 minutes
- Countries: United States; Romania; Iceland
- Language: English

Paranoia: 1.0 (originally One Point O, also known as 1.0, One Point Zero, Version 1.0, and Virus 1.0) is a 2004 cyberpunk dystopian horror mystery written and directed by Jeff Renfroe and Marteinn Thorsson. The film stars Jeremy Sisto and Deborah Unger and features Lance Henriksen, Eugene Byrd, Bruce Payne and Udo Kier.

== Plot ==
A computer programmer and network engineer Simon J. (Jeremy Sisto) begins finding empty plain paper packages in his apartment. Simon goes to great length to try and secure his apartment, but the packages keep appearing. Simon attempts to find out who is leaving the packages. At the same time, Simon, who works in IT, is under pressure to complete a programming project. Simon has also become obsessed with purchasing Nature Fresh brand milk. One of Simon's friends, a courier named Nile (Eugene Byrd), tells Simon that he needs to remedy his social isolation. During his investigation, Simon becomes acquainted with his eccentric neighbours in the block of apartments where he lives. The lifts within the apartment block have ceased working and the corridors are filled with security cameras. Derrick (Udo Kier), who occupies an apartment across the hall from Simon, has developed an artificial intelligence robot head, which Simon finds intriguing. Derrick suggests that the Neighbour (Bruce Payne), who occupies the apartment next to Simon's, may be responsible for the packages. Simon confronts the Neighbour, in the corridor, and asks him whether he has been leaving him packages. The Neighbour, exuding charisma and macho-ness, simply laughs at him.

Simon follows the Neighbour to and from a nightclub. In the nightclub, Simon sees the Neighbour interacting with a number of women, including Trish (Deborah Kara Unger). Trish notices Simon staring at them. On the way home from the nightclub, the Neighbour soon realises that he is being followed and pulls a knife on Simon. When the Neighbour realises who Simon is, he invites him into his apartment for a drink. Before entering his apartment, the Neighbour smashes the security cameras in the corridor. When Simon enters the Neighbour's apartment, he becomes aware that his refrigerator is filled with cans of cola 500. The Neighbour invites Simon to participate in a virtual reality sex-game that he has developed and which features Trish. Simon immerses himself within the virtual reality game. When he exits the game, he finds the Neighbour bleeding and dying. The Neighbour advises him that he had also been receiving packages, before dying. Simon subsequently develops a romantic relationship with Trish. Trish is obsessed with orange juice.

As Simon continues his investigations, a number of other murders begin happening in the building. Simon becomes aware that the other residents are receiving packages too but were keeping quiet. Simon also learns that the other residents are becoming addicted to certain products. The only person in the apartment who is not affected is the janitor, Howard (Lance Henriksen). Nile tells Simon about a corporate experiment to ‘infuse’ Nanomites into people's brains to make them addicted to certain products. Simon dismisses Nile's claims as a lie, but eventually realises that he is telling the truth.

== Cast ==
- Jeremy Sisto as Simon J.
- Deborah Kara Unger as Trish
- Udo Kier as Derrick
- Bruce Payne as Neighbor
- Lance Henriksen as Howard
- Eugene Byrd as Nile
- Emil Hostina as Landlord
- Constantin Cotimanis as Detective Polanski
- Sebastian Knapp as Detective Harris
- Constantin Florescu as Tall Man
- Ana Maria Popa as Alice
- Matt Devlen as Cashier
- Udo Kier and Jeremy Sisto both voiced the robot head

== Production ==
Paranoia 1.0 was an international co-production, and was shot entirely in Bucharest, Romania. It premiered in competition at the 2004 Sundance Film Festival under its original title (One Point O). The programming code seen in the film is from Viralator 0.9. The directors cited a number of influences on the film including Orson Welles' The Trial, Ridley Scott's Blade Runner, Michelangelo Antonioni's Red Desert, Michael Powell's Peeping Tom and David Cronenberg's Videodrome. Frances Dyson contended that the film is similar to films such as Brazil and Johnny Mnemonic, in the preponderance of grime and consistency of a metal and dirt futuristic aesthetic. The parts of Derrick and Trish were written with Udo Kier and Deborah Kara Unger in mind. Adrien Brody was set to play Simon, but this fell through and Jeremy Sisto was cast. Bruce Payne joined the cast after filming had begun in Bucharest.

== Awards and honors ==
2004

Sundance Film Festival (Park City, Utah, USA)
Grand Jury Prize, Dramatic Category; Nominated: Jeff Renfroe, Marteinn Thorsson.
Sitges - Catalan International Film Festival (Sitges, Spain)
Nominated Best Film; Recipients: Marteinn Thorsson, Jeff Renfroe.
Fant-Asia Film Festival (Montreal, Canada)
AQCC Award-Mention: Jeff Renfroe, Marteinn Thorsson; Best International Film (Jury Prize): Jeff Renfroe, Marteinn Thorsson; Most Ground-Breaking Film (Jury Prize): Jeff Renfroe, Marteinn Thorsson.

2005

Edda Awards (Iceland)
Edda Award Category: Best Picture (nominated); Best Production Design: Eggert Ketilsson (nominated); Best Sound or Music: Bradley L. North, Byron Wilson, Ann Scibelli (nominated); Director of the Year: Marteinn Thorsson, Jeff Renfroe (nominated).
Málaga International Week of Fantastic Cinema (Spain)
Best Actress: Deborah Kara Unger; Best Film: Jeff Renfroe, Marteinn Thorsson; Youth Jury Award (Best Feature Film): Jeff Renfroe, Marteinn Thorsson.

== Reception ==
One reviewer stated that 'If Philip K. Dick was reading Kafka, got freaked out and wrote The Matrix, which was then directed by Stanley Kubrick, you might end up with something like this'. Phil Davies-Brown stated that the 'film is such an accomplished piece of work with rich texture, amazing use of location, lighting and camera and fine performances from some of the genre's most respected talents'. Commenting on the performances of individual cast members, Davies-Brown stated that Jeremy Sisto 'was his usual weird self but it worked a treat', that 'Bruce Payne was intimidating', that Udo Kier was 'hilarious', that Deborah Kara Unger was 'mysterious' and that Lance Henriksen 'turned in his best performance in a long while'. Neil Karassik stated that the film was 'enjoyable and visually admirable'. Ryan Cracknell commented that 'while the story is very original combining the techno-edge of The Matrix with Orson Welles’ The Trial, it's the mood and atmosphere where the filmmakers really shine'. Ultimo Franco gave the film a score of 3 out of 5, commented that 'the film looks beautiful' and stated that 'fans of Guillermo del Toro and David Fincher should find a lot to appreciate here'. The film was given a score of 9 out of 10 on the website Cyberpunkreview.com, which stated that the film 'has perhaps the most biting commentary on advertising and software development you will find anywhere'. Andrea Ballerini stated that 'the movie has all the classic ingredients of the cyberpunk genre: a dystopian environment, powerful corporations trying to rule the citizens, the role of technology in the development of society, the pros and cons of progress'.

Hildur Loftsdóttir gave the film three stars out of five, noted the influence of David Cronenberg and David Lynch and stated that the story was 'both original and well thought out'. Rainer Heinz described the film as a 'Kafkaesk-morbid thriller with effectively interwoven set pieces from films like Blade Runner, Matrix, Cube and Delicatessen and a fascinating colour and image aesthetic'. He also stated that the film was 'a gripping and dark science fiction thriller, which achieves its effect not least from brilliant image design'. Hal Astell stated that the film 'is a real triumph, an intelligent science fiction story that deliberately removes itself from time and place yet remains utterly timely'. Simon Hyslop described the film as 'a treat for anyone with an appreciation for the quieter, artier manifestations of the sci-fi genre'. A reviewer for TV Guide stated that 'sci-fi drama and paranoid thrills drive this smart and highly original chiller'. A Hungarian reviewer stated that the film contained a 'large dose of social criticism disguised as a thriller'.

Scott Foundas was more critical of the film, stating that it 'frantically stitches together images and ideas lifted from George Orwell, The Matrix and films by David Cronenberg, only to end up with a haphazard Frankenstein monster of a movie'. Brian McKay was also critical of the film, stating that 'the plot and character development are about as thin as the atmosphere on Pluto'. Erik Childress stated that the 'film is very much like Soylent Green...as our protagonist wades through a creepy and dank futuristic setting before being hit over the head with a staggering realization' but that 'like the Charlton Heston cult classic, there's a lot of atmosphere to engulf an audience but it becomes tiresome, only to get really interesting again in the final scenes'. In 2007, the film was listed as one of the “Top 50 Dystopian Movies of All Time” by Snarkerati, a popular movie web-magazine. Kelvin Polowy stated that 'like The Matrix, the film plays on corporate and technological paranoia, and it's a stylish if not ground breaking entry into the subgenre'.

In an academic appraisal of the film, Angelos Koutsourakis stated that 'the film's representational solution to the complexity of surveillance capitalism draws on the Marxist understanding of capital as vampiric dead labor that feeds on the workers bodies and brains during their labor time; but here the dead labor of capital is pictured consuming individuals even during their leisure time and this coincides with Zuboff’s argument that...surveillance capitalism feeds on every aspect of every human's experience'.
