= Hollywood North (film) =

- Directed by: Peter O'Brian
- Written by: Barry Healey; John Hunter; Tony Johnston
- Produced by: John Gillespie
- Starring: Matthew Modine; Alan Bates; Jennifer Tilly; Fab Filippo; Deborah Kara Unger
- Cinematography: Barry Stone
- Edited by: Lisa Grootenboer
- Music by: Terence Gowan; Blair Packham
- Distributed by: Franchise Pictures
- Release dates: September 5, 2003 (Toronto International Film Festival); January 12, 2004 (Canada)
- Running time: 89 minutes
- Country: Canada
- Language: English

Hollywood North is a 2003 Canadian comedy film starring Matthew Modine and Jennifer Tilly. It is a mockumentary detailing the struggles of two Canadian movie producers in Toronto circa 1979. The title is a reference to the colloquialism "Hollywood North".

== Reception ==
=== Critical reception ===
Rotten Tomatoes reported that 44% of 9 sampled critics gave the film positive reviews and that it received a rating average of 5.41/10.
