= The End (The X-Files) =

- The X-Files episode
- Episode no.: Season 5 Episode 20
- Directed by: R. W. Goodwin
- Written by: Chris Carter
- Production code: 5X20
- Original air date: May 17, 1998
- Running time: 46 minutes

Guest appearances
- William B. Davis as The Smoking Man; Chris Owens as Jeffrey Spender; Nicholas Lea as Alex Krycek; Mitch Pileggi as Walter Skinner; Mimi Rogers as Diana Fowley; John Neville as Well-Manicured Man; Tom Braidwood as Melvin Frohike; Dean Haglund as Richard Langly; Bruce Harwood as John Fitzgerald Byers; Jeff Gulka as Gibson Praise; Don S. Williams as First Elder; George Murdock as Second Elder; John Moore as Third Elder; Martin Ferrero as Shooter; Michael Shamus Wiles as Black Haired Man; Orest Blajkevitch as Anatole Klebanow; Patrick Phillips as Clinician #1; Paul Moniz De Sa as Clinician #2; John Trotter as Clinician #3

Episode chronology
← Previous "Folie à Deux"	Next → "The Beginning"
- The X-Files season 5

"The End" is the 20th and final episode of the fifth season, and 117th overall of the science fiction television series The X-Files. The episode first aired in the United States and Canada on May 17, 1998. "The End" subsequently aired in the United Kingdom on March 17, 1999, on BBC One. The episode was written by executive producer Chris Carter, and directed by R. W. Goodwin. "The End" earned a Nielsen household rating of 11.9, being watched by 18.76 million people in its initial broadcast. The episode received mixed to positive reviews from television critics.

The show centers on FBI special agents Fox Mulder (David Duchovny) and Dana Scully (Gillian Anderson) who work on cases linked to the paranormal, called X-Files. Mulder is a believer in the paranormal, while the skeptical Scully has been assigned to debunk his work. In this episode, the assassination of a chess grandmaster leads Mulder and Scully to learn that the real target was a telepathic boy named Gibson Praise. The two agents soon learn that Praise may hold the secrets to all the mysteries that they have been seeking answers to in the X-Files.

The episode was originally supposed to be the series finale for the show, allowing the series to evolve into a film franchise following the release of the 1998 movie. However, the series proved too profitable for Fox and a sixth season was ordered. "The End" would be the last episode of the original run to be filmed in Vancouver until the show's tenth season, as production for the subsequent four seasons moved to Los Angeles, California. "The End" features the first appearance of Diana Fowley, portrayed by Mimi Rogers, who would become a recurring character. As a season finale, it created loose ends for both the feature film and the subsequent season opener, "The Beginning".

== Plot ==
In Vancouver, an international chess tournament is held at an arena between Anatole Klebanow, a Russian grandmaster, and Gibson Praise (Jeff Gulka), a young American prodigy. In the rafters, the Shooter, an assassin, prepares to fire at Gibson. However, Gibson senses the Shooter's presence and manages to discreetly dodge the shot, which kills Klebanow instead.

Elsewhere in Canada, the Smoking Man (William B. Davis) is found by Alex Krycek (Nicholas Lea). At FBI Headquarters, Walter Skinner (Mitch Pileggi) reveals to Fox Mulder (David Duchovny) that Jeffrey Spender (Chris Owens) is leading the case investigating the shooting. Despite Spender's request that Mulder not be involved, he bursts into the briefing and offers the explanation that the assassin was firing at Gibson, not Klebanow. Attending the meeting is Diana Fowley (Mimi Rogers), an acquaintance from Mulder's past. The Smoking Man is reunited with members of the Syndicate, including the First Elder and the Well-Manicured Man, who want him to help them with the situation concerning Gibson. Fowley accompanies Mulder and Dana Scully (Gillian Anderson) when they visit Gibson in Gaithersburg, Maryland. Mulder believes that Gibson can read minds, hence his expertise at chess. Scully learns that Mulder and Fowley know each other from long ago.

Mulder visits the Shooter, despite Spender's objections, offering immunity in exchange for testimony; the Shooter refuses. Gibson proves his abilities to a group of clinicians while Scully and Fowley watch. Meanwhile, a prison guard hands the Shooter a flattened Morley cigarette box, which conveys he's a dead man. Scully visits the Lone Gunmen, wanting them to analyze the data from Gibson. She asks them who Fowley is, and they tell her she worked closely with Mulder when he first discovered the X-files. The Smoking Man meets with Spender in the FBI parking lot but disappears when Mulder spots them talking. Scully and Mulder present to Skinner on Gibson, who displays extraordinary brain activity. Mulder believes that Gibson can unlock all the mysteries in the X-Files and wants to make a deal with the Shooter. Skinner and Fowley think this may result in adverse attention from the Attorney General, and that the X-Files could be closed down if things go wrong. Mulder dismisses the risk.

Mulder meets with the Shooter again, who tells him that Gibson is a missing link. Mulder believes that Gibson has genes that are dormant in most humans. The Smoking Man dismisses the Well-Manicured Man's concerns about Mulder's actions. At the prison, the guard kills the Shooter. Fowley, protecting Gibson in a hotel room, is shot shortly afterwards, and Gibson is captured by the Men in Black. Skinner tells Mulder of the Shooter's death, and that a flattened Morley cigarette box was found in his cell. Mulder confronts Spender, accusing him of working with the Smoking Man. The Smoking Man turns Gibson over to the Well-Manicured Man. Scully is informed by Skinner that the Justice Department is seeking to have the X-files shut down. Mulder realizes that this was all part of a plan. The Smoking Man takes Samantha Mulder's X-file from Mulder's office, which he sets on fire. As he leaves, he meets Spender and tells him that he's his father. By the time Mulder and Scully arrive, the X-files are completely destroyed.

== Production ==
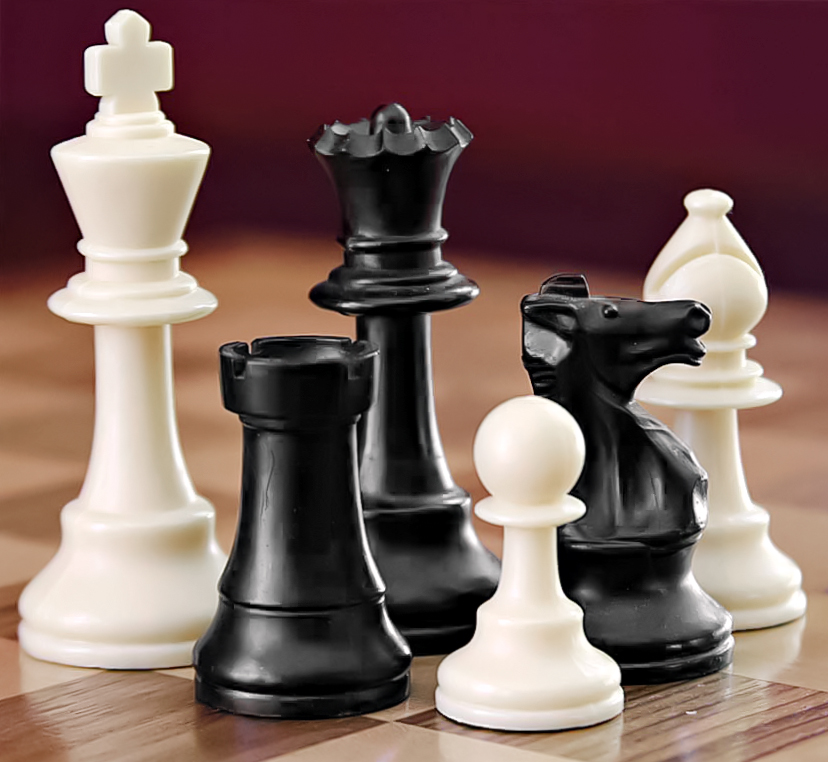
The episode contains a "chess motif" of The Smoking Man "play[ing] Mulder to a checkmate".

=== Writing ===
Originally, the fifth season of The X-Files was supposed to be its last, and "The End" would have segued the series into a movie franchise. David Duchovny explained, "We were saying, 'Okay, we're going to do five. We'll get out of here at five.' And then five came around, and no one was going anywhere." This is largely because the series was so lucrative for Fox that two additional seasons were ordered. Thus, "The End" had to segue into both The X-Files movie, as well as the sixth-season premiere, "The Beginning".

Near the beginning of the episode, Praise plays a Russian grandmaster at chess. The Complete X-Files notes that a "chess motif" is weaved throughout the episode, perhaps most symbolically in the way The Smoking Man "plays Mulder to a checkmate, using Jeffrey as a pawn." Because of this, and his past actions, many fans finally came to believe that The Smoking Man was the true villain of the story. William B. Davis, who played The Smoking Man, however, felt that the character was the hero. He noted, "I used to go to conventions and try to convince everyone that I was the hero of the series and Mulder was the bad guy. […] I got a lot of laughs, but it's certainly true of how one plays the character. Nobody thinks they're evil."

=== Casting and filming ===
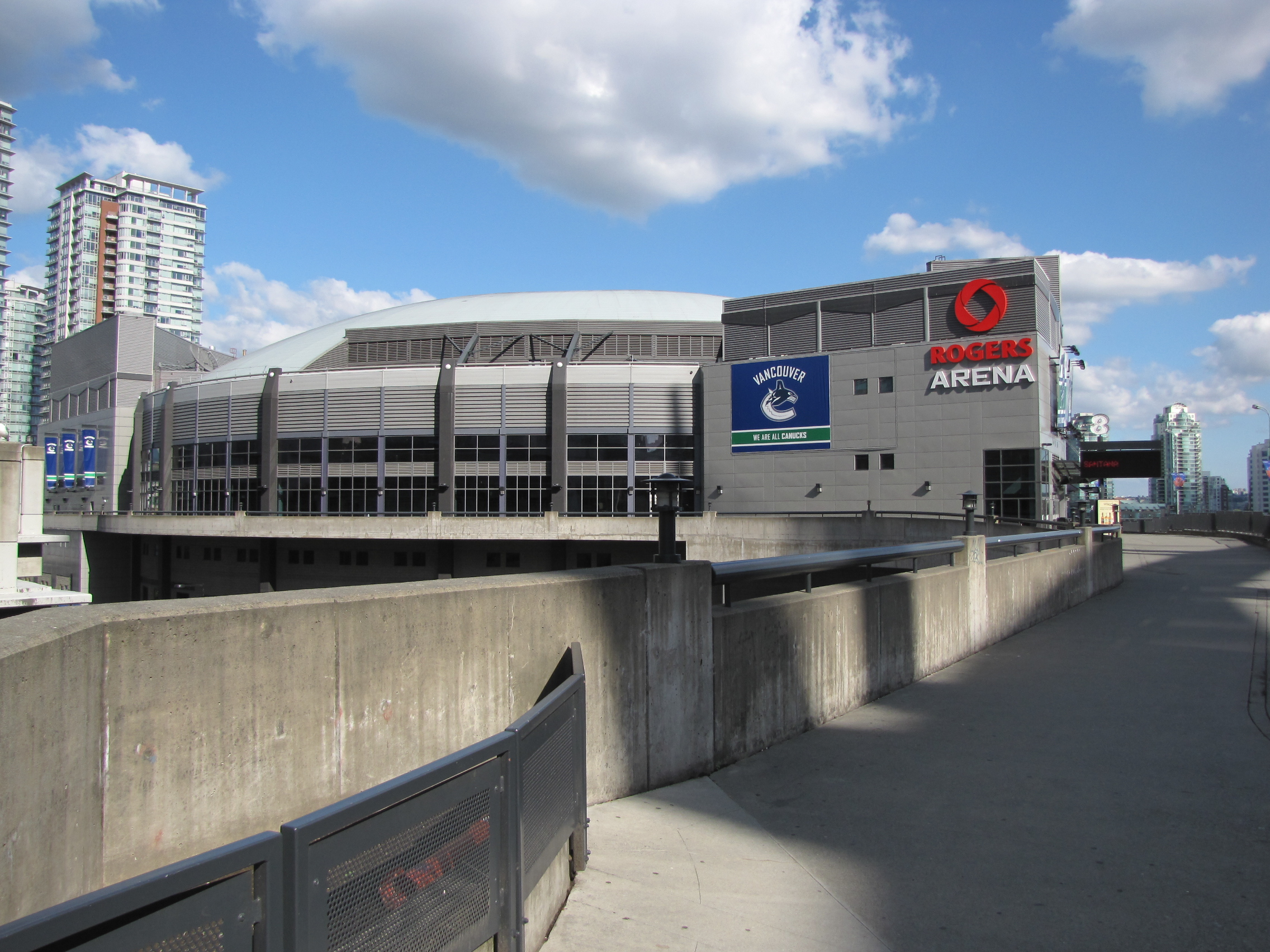
The opening of the episode was filmed at Rogers Arena in Vancouver.

The episode introduced two new characters in Gibson Praise, played by Jeff Gulka, and Diana Fowley, portrayed by Mimi Rogers. Kim Manners later said of Gulka, "There was something about that kid's personality that really came off on screen. He really exuded an intelligence that was pretty special. Chris saw what Bob Goodwin did with him and he knew that this kid was a special storytelling tool for the chronicle of the X-Files". Chris Carter said that Fowley "was a character you were destined to hate because she was a competitor for Mulder's affection with Scully". Gillian Anderson said, "She didn't make it easy on Scully. I think she was aware of her effect on Mulder and on the situation."

This episode was the last to be filmed in Vancouver, British Columbia, Canada until the show's tenth season in 2015. The show moved to Los Angeles for its sixth through ninth seasons, a move influenced in part by David Duchovny's desire to be closer to his wife. The audience at the chess match was made up of local fans as a way of saying thanks to the city for hosting production during its first five years. The chess match was filmed at Rogers Arena—then known as GM Place—then the home of the Vancouver Canucks as well as the Vancouver Grizzlies. While the producers expected five thousand people to show up, twelve thousand appeared. During breaks between shooting, actors Duchovny and Anderson answered questions for the audience and thousands of dollars' worth of equipment was raffled off. In order to properly send off the Vancouver crew, Chris Carter personally directed the second unit filming for this episode.

== Reception ==
=== Ratings ===
"The End" premiered on the Fox network on May 17, 1998. The episode earned a Nielsen household rating of 11.9 with an 18 share, meaning that roughly 11.9 percent of all television-equipped households, and 18 percent of households watching television, were tuned in to the episode. A total of 18.76 million viewers watched the episode during its original airing. The episode was later included on The X-Files Mythology, Volume 3 – Colonization, a DVD collection that contains episodes involved with the alien Colonist's plans to take over the earth.

=== Reviews ===
"The End" received mixed to positive reviews from critics. Lon Grahnke of Chicago Sun-Times reacted positively towards the episode, describing it as "pivotal". Paula Vitaris from Cinefantastique gave the episode a positive review and awarded it three stars out of four. She wrote that the episode "is an effective, sometimes even moving, conclusion to a scattershot season." Vitaris wrote that the entry was "far superior" to the season four finale "Gethsemane" and praised the various character introductions, most notably that of Gibson Praise and Diana Fowley. She did, however, criticize the reappearance of Krycek and the fact that The Smoking Man was again working for the Syndicate. In a 2000 review of season five for the New Straits Times, Francis Dass called "The End" a "gem" and praised the acting of Jeff Gulka, saying that he was a "great child actor".

Other reviews were more mixed. Zack Handlen of The A.V. Club gave the episode a mixed review and graded it C+. Handlen criticized the episode's lack of resolution, writing that "The show can feed our social paranoia […] but when it comes time to deliver on all this, to finally pull back the curtain and move on to the next stage, it fumbles things." Furthermore, he called the Mulder/Scully/Fowley love triangle "immediately off-putting" and criticized Mimi Rogers's characterization. However, Handlen did call The Smoking Man's return "thrilling" and wrote that the burning of Mulder's office was "arguably one of the most iconic visuals in the run of the series". Robert Shearman and Lars Pearson, in their book Wanting to Believe: A Critical Guide to The X-Files, Millennium & The Lone Gunmen, rated the episode three-and-a-half stars out of five. The two criticized the closing down of the X-Files division, due largely to the fact that "we've seen [it] before", a reference to the division's closing at the end of the first season. However, Shearman and Pearson wrote that "'The End' works in spite of itself", citing the arrival of Diana Fowley and the confrontation between The Smoking Man and Jeffrey Spender as positive points in the episode.

== Bibliography ==
- Hurwitz, Matt & Knowles, Chris (2008). The Complete X-Files: Behind the Series the Myths and the Movies. New York, US: Insight Editions. ISBN 978-1933784724.
- Meisler, Andy (1999). Resist or Serve: The Official Guide to The X-Files, Vol. 4. London: HarperCollins. ISBN 0-00-257133-1.
- Shearman, Robert; Pearson, Lars (2009). Wanting to Believe: A Critical Guide to The X-Files, Millennium & The Lone Gunmen. Mad Norwegian Press. ISBN 978-0975944691.
