= The Pine Bluff Variant =

- The X-Files episode
- The effects of the biological weapon, which causes rapid degeneration of human flesh. The special effects and mood for the scene were critically applauded.
- Episode no.: Season 5 Episode 18
- Directed by: Rob Bowman
- Written by: John Shiban
- Production code: 5X18
- Original air date: May 3, 1998
- Running time: 45 minutes

Guest appearances
- Daniel von Bargen as Jacob Haley; J.B. Bivens as Field Agent; Armin Moattar as Goatee Man; Sam Anderson as Leamus; Michael MacRae as August Bremer; Kate Braidwood as the Usherette; Ralph Alderman as the Manager; Trevor Roald as Martin; Kett Turton as Brit; Douglas Arthurs as Skin-Head Man; John B. Lowe as Dr. Leavitt; Michael St. John Smith as the CIA Operative

Episode chronology
← Previous "All Souls"	Next → "Folie à Deux"
- The X-Files season 5

"The Pine Bluff Variant" is the eighteenth episode of the fifth season of the American science fiction television series The X-Files. It was written by John Shiban and directed by Rob Bowman. The episode aired in the United States on May 3, 1998 on the Fox network. The episode is a "Monster-of-the-Week" story, a stand-alone plot which is unconnected to the series' wider mythology, or fictional history. "The Pine Bluff Variant" received a Nielsen household rating of 11.4 and was watched by 18.24 million viewers in its initial broadcast. It received largely positive reviews from television critics as well as fans on the internet.

The show centers on FBI special agents Fox Mulder (David Duchovny) and Dana Scully (Gillian Anderson) who work on cases linked to the paranormal, called X-Files. In this episode, Scully grows suspicious of Mulder when she thinks he may be helping a terrorist organization. Scully begins to wonder if he is now a traitor to the FBI. It is eventually revealed that Mulder is working as a mole in the group, and he is trying to stop them before they are able to use a biological weapon—that may have been created by members of the U.S. government—which causes rapid degeneration of human flesh.

"The Pine Bluff Variant" was based on the idea of Mulder going undercover, a topic that Shiban had wanted to work on for a majority of the fifth season. Shiban argued that the concept worked for the series because the theme of Mulder questioning his beliefs was a major element of the fifth season. The episode was indirectly influenced by the 1963 novel The Spy Who Came in from the Cold, written by John le Carré. The title is also a reference to the Pine Bluff Arsenal, a real United States military base with stockpiles of chemical weapons.

== Plot ==
Fox Mulder (David Duchovny), Dana Scully (Gillian Anderson), Walter Skinner (Mitch Pileggi), and several other FBI agents hide in a Washington park to catch Jacob Haley (Daniel von Bargen), the second-in-command of an anti-government militia called the New Spartans. As Mulder and the other agents slowly secretly corner Haley, Haley hands an envelope to another man (Armin Moattar) before running off. Mulder gives chase, but Haley somehow evades capture. The agents then discover that the flesh of the man who was handed the envelope has been eaten away by an unknown toxin.

Scully is frustrated that Haley escaped and questions Mulder as to how it happened, but he dodges her queries. Later, at a counter-terrorism task force led by Skinner and U.S. Attorney Leamus (Sam Anderson), Skinner explains that August Bremer (Michael MacRae), the leader of the New Spartans, is involved in an internal power struggle with Haley. At this meeting, Scully also reveals that the man killed in the park was exposed to some sort of biological agent. Later, Scully follows Mulder and sees him meeting with Haley. When she tries to pursue them, she is surrounded by government agents and brought before Skinner and Leamus, who inform her that Mulder is infiltrating the group as an undercover agent.

Mulder is taken to the New Spartans' secluded hideout, where Haley accuses him of being a government mole. Mulder is tortured until he claims that the group has been infiltrated by a different spy. Elsewhere, Bremer enters a movie theater in Middlefield, Ohio, and exposes its patrons to the biological agent, killing everyone inside. Investigating the scene, Scully becomes confused as to how the contagion was spread, as it is not airborne. Later, Scully meets Mulder at his apartment, where, unbeknownst to them, their conversation about the ongoing mission is recorded by Bremer.

Mulder informs the FBI task force that the New Spartans are planning to rob a bank. Meanwhile, Scully discovers that the biological weapon was engineered by the U.S. government, and is spread by touch. She concludes that Haley wants to break into the bank, not to steal money, but rather to contaminate the money, thereby spreading it to millions of people across the country. She also concludes that the entire scheme was a trap intended to kill Mulder. After the fake robbery, Bremer accuses Mulder of being the mole; Haley, however, counters that Bremer is the real mole. To further his argument, Bremer plays back the tape of Mulder and Scully that he had made earlier. With power now consolidated, Bremer gives Haley a chance to peacefully leave the group by giving him a set of car keys. Haley agrees to these terms and takes the key. Bremer, along with a muscleman from the group, takes Mulder into a desolate area, where it is implied he will be killed. However, Bremer instead kills the muscleman and lets Mulder go, telling him there's a car waiting for him over the ridge.

Mulder arrives at the bank to find that Scully has managed to have it quarantined, and the contaminated money taken away. They also confront Leamus, suggesting that this entire case was a covert government bioweapons test. Leamus responds that it is part of his job to protect the public from the truth. In the final scene, Haley is revealed to have been killed by the contaminated car keys.

== Production ==
=== Writing ===
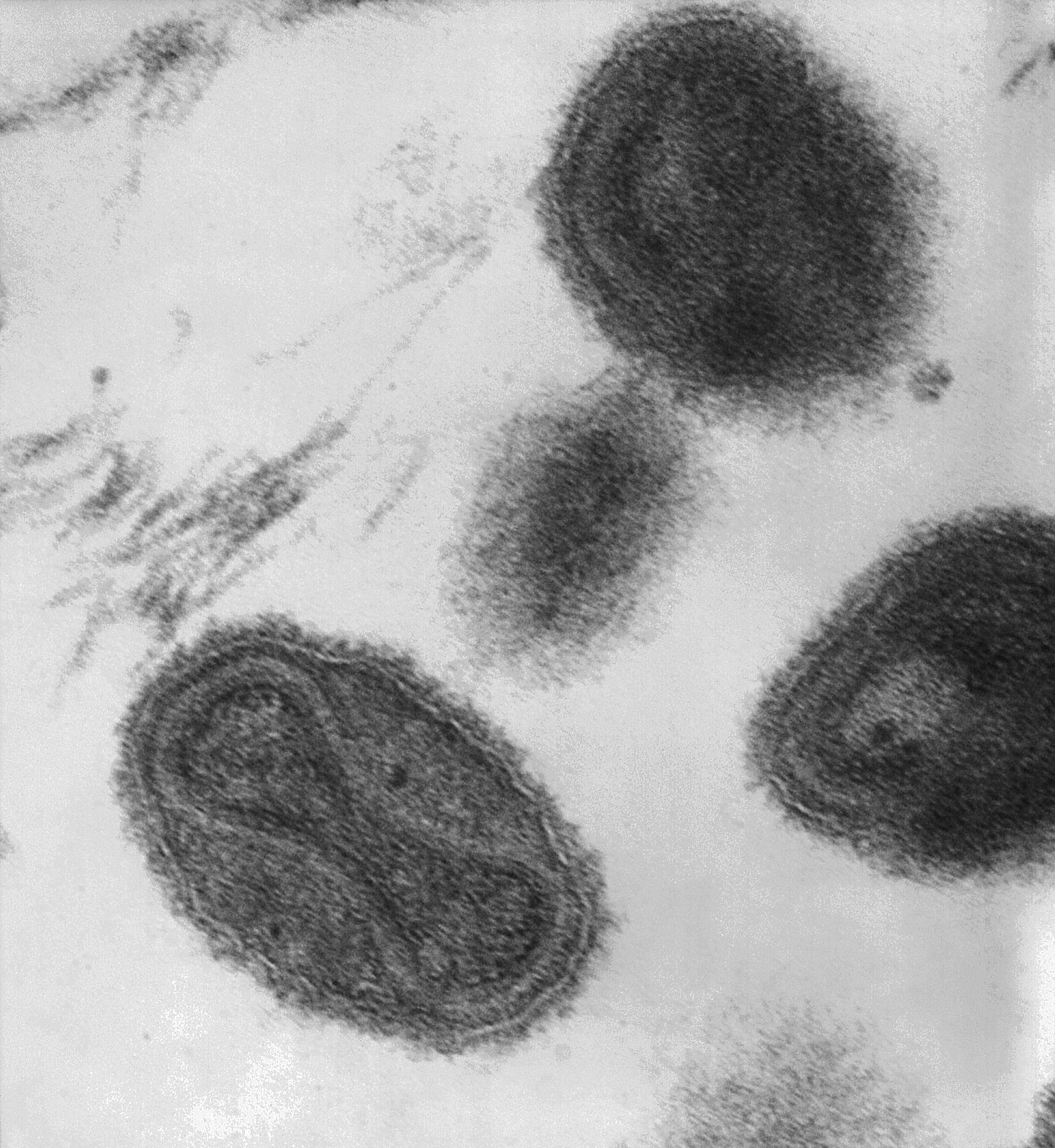
The episode is based around the idea of biological weapons (Smallpox virus pictured).

"The Pine Bluff Variant" was written by John Shiban based on an idea about Mulder going undercover that he had had for much of the fifth season. This story appealed to him, and he later said: "It always seemed to fit to me—putting Mulder in a situation [where we] don't know his allegiance." Shiban argued that the concept also worked because the theme of Mulder questioning his beliefs was a major element of the fifth season. Shiban petitioned Frank Spotnitz several times about the idea until "the right time and the right way" presented itself.

According to Shiban, the 1995 action film Heat was an inspiration for the episode, as was the 1963 novel The Spy Who Came in from the Cold, written by John le Carré. Because the Cold War had ended almost a decade prior, Shiban decided to introduce a new "bogeyman"—in this case, domestic terrorism. The writing staff also played off then-recent fears about Saddam Hussein's use of biological weapons to craft the basic premise of the script. The title refers to the Pine Bluff Arsenal, a U.S. Army installation located in Jefferson County, Arkansas, just northwest of the city of Pine Bluff that stored chemical weapons.

=== Filming ===
Daniel von Bargen and Michael MacRae were cast as Jacob Haley and August Bremer, respectively. Von Bargen was chosen due to his experience in several films, whereas MacRae had previously been cast in the first season episode "The Jersey Devil". First assistant director Tom Braidwood's daughter Kate Braidwood played an usherette. The mother and child that are in the bank during the holdup scene were played by the wife and daughter of Todd Pittson, the show's locations manager.

Scenes at the movie theater were filmed at the Dunbar Theatre in Vancouver, British Columbia. The location featured the "architectural and design characteristics of a small-town cinema situated within an appropriate neighbourhood". The movie that is being shown is Die Hard with a Vengeance (1995), whose storyline of a mission by terrorists involving American banks is broadly mirrored in this episode's plot. The faux corpses were created by make-up artist Toby Lindala; when he brought them to the set, however, there was no room to store them, and so he kept them temporarily in the craft services room. A Bank of Canada money depository stood in for the Pennsylvania bank robbed in the episode. The production staff assembled more than 15,000 dollar bills of various denominations—which valued somewhere near $40,000—for use during the bank scenes. Production initially halted because there was only one police guard on duty. Fearful that an actual armed robbery might take place, back-up was brought in, allowing filming to proceed.

The scene in the teaser is set in Folger Park, located in Washington, D.C. It was actually filmed in Vancouver, like the rest of the episode, and the Capitol building in the background was edited into the background using CGI technology. The scene with the biotoxin melting a man's face in the opening was also created with computers.

== Reception ==
=== Ratings ===
"The Pine Bluff Variant" premiered on the Fox network in the United States on May 3, 1998. It earned a Nielsen household rating of 11.4, meaning that roughly 11.4 percent of all television-equipped households were tuned in to the episode. It was viewed by 18.24 million viewers.

=== Reviews ===
"The Pine Bluff Variant" received largely positive reviews from critics. Andy Meisler, in his 1999 book Resist or Serve: The Official Guide to The X-Files, Vol. 4, noted that the episode was particularly well received by fans on the Internet, due to its realistic conceit. Zack Handlen from The A.V. Club wrote positively of the entry and awarded it an "A". He called it "an excellent episode" that is "notable for its tension" and the fact that it "seemingly tells a story that has little to do with the X-Files or Mulder and Scully's search for the truth—right up until the final twist." Furthermore, Handlen called Shiban's script "by far his best" and noted that the melted corpses in the episode provided "a striking, deeply creepy visual". Robert Shearman and Lars Pearson, in their book Wanting to Believe: A Critical Guide to The X-Files, Millennium & The Lone Gunmen, rated the episode four stars out of five. The two called the entry "cleverer than most" latter season episodes that feature Mulder or Scully undergoing a psychotic break, due to its "straight-forward thriller" sensibilities. Jonathan Dunn, writing for What Culture, highlighted "The Pine Bluff Variant" for its cinematic appeal and included it in the "5 Episodes [of The X-Files] That Could Be Made Into Movies" list.

Other reviews were more mixed. Paula Vitaris of Cinefantastique gave the episode a moderately positive review and awarded it two-and-a-half stars out of four. Vitaris called the episode "an absorbing hour of entertainment." She did, however, identify the red herring in which Scully suspects Mulder as the weakest part of the story, noting that Mulder "would [never] throw in with terrorists".

== Bibliography ==
- Gradnitzer, Louisa; Pittson, Todd (1999). X marks the spot: on location with the X-files. Arsenal Pulp Press. ISBN 1-55152-066-4.
- Meisler, Andy (1999). Resist or Serve: The Official Guide to The X-Files, Vol. 4. London: HarperCollins. ISBN 0-00-257133-1.
- Shearman, Robert; Pearson, Lars (2009). Wanting to Believe: A Critical Guide to The X-Files, Millennium & The Lone Gunmen. Mad Norwegian Press. ISBN 978-0975944691.
