= Stir of Echoes =

1999 film by David Koepp

- Theatrical release poster
- Directed by: David Koepp
- Screenplay by: David Koepp
- Based on: A Stir of Echoes by Richard Matheson
- Produced by: Judy Hofflund; Gavin Polone
- Starring: Kevin Bacon; Kathryn Erbe; Illeana Douglas; Kevin Dunn
- Cinematography: Fred Murphy
- Edited by: Jill Savitt
- Music by: James Newton Howard
- Production companies: Cacophony Productions; Artisan Entertainment
- Distributed by: Artisan Entertainment
- Release date: September 10, 1999 (United States)
- Running time: 99 minutes
- Country: United States
- Language: English
- Budget: $12 million
- Box office: $23 million

Stir of Echoes is a 1999 American supernatural horror film written and directed by David Koepp, starring Kevin Bacon, Kathryn Erbe, Illeana Douglas, and Kevin Dunn. It is an adaptation of the 1958 novel by Richard Matheson. The film follows Tom Witzky (Bacon), a working-class family man who, after being hypnotized by his sister-in-law, begins experiencing a series of disturbing visions connected to a missing intellectually disabled 17-year-old girl.

It was produced by Judy Hofflund and Gavin Polone, with Michele Weisler serving as executive producer. Theatrically released in the United States by Artisan Entertainment on September 10, 1999, Stir of Echoes received generally positive reviews from critics and grossed over $23 million at the worldwide box office.

== Plot ==
Tom Witzky is a phone lineman living in a working-class neighborhood in Chicago with his pregnant wife Maggie and his son Jake, who possesses the ability to communicate with the dead, although neither Tom nor Maggie yet know about it. At a party one evening, Tom challenges Maggie's sister, Lisa, who is a believer in paranormal activity, to hypnotize him. After putting him under, Lisa plants a post-hypnotic suggestion in Tom urging him to "be more open-minded". Tom then begins experiencing visions of a violent scuffle involving a girl who he learns is Samantha Kozac, a 17-year-old who disappeared from the neighborhood six months earlier and had an intellectual disability, with the mental capacity of an eight-year-old and thus a child's tendency to trust strangers.

While Tom and Maggie attend a high-school football game, Jake is overheard by his babysitter, Debbie, as he speaks with Samantha. Debbie gets upset and snatches Jake, running off with him in the night. Tom senses Jake is in danger and sees strange flashes of red light that lead him to the Metra station where Debbie is speaking with her mother about Jake. When Tom and Maggie confront her and with a police officer now present, Debbie angrily questions them about her sister Samantha, explaining that she ran away from home.

Tom becomes obsessed with Samantha and begins probing members of the community about her disappearance. This attracts the attention of his landlord Harry Damon, Tom's friend, Frank McCarthy and their respective sons Kurt Damon and Adam McCarthy, who all dismiss Samantha as a runaway teen. After another prophetic vision in which Frank tells Tom that "they're going to kill you and Maggie both," Tom finds that Adam has shot himself in Frank's home and is in critical condition.

During an afternoon walk, Jake and Maggie encounter a funeral where Chicago policemen are saluting in a ceremony; a policeman named Neil recognizes Jake's unique talent and invites Tom to a private gathering of like-minded people to learn more about what is happening to his son. Maggie goes to the meeting herself, and Neil tells her the spirit that contacted Tom has asked for something and will grow upset if it does not get done. As predicted, Samantha begins plaguing Tom, leading to his insomnia. Samantha tells him to dig. Tom complies and digs holes in the backyard and tears up the house in a desperate attempt to appease Samantha.

While Maggie and Jake attend her grandmother's wake at a relative's house, Tom inadvertently knocks down a shoddy brick wall in the basement and discovers Samantha's mummified remains. He receives a vision showing him that before his family moved in, a drunken Adam and Kurt lured Samantha into the house to rape her. When she resisted and began to scream, they smothered her to death and hid her body. Tom brings Frank back to the basement to disclose to him the crime. Frank breaks down and admits that Adam and Kurt had confided their secret to him and Harry, and that they had helped cover up their sons' crime. Frank pulls out a gun and demands to be alone. As Tom leaves, he hears a single shot.

Harry and Kurt arrive and corner Tom with the intention of killing him, but Maggie interrupts. As Harry takes her hostage, Frank emerges and fatally shoots Kurt and Harry. Tom notices Samantha's spirit smile and disappear. Afterward, the family moves out of the house. Samantha's mother and sister are able to give her a proper burial. Jake covers his ears as his family approaches their new home, overwhelmed by all of the spirits that linger in the houses they pass by.

== Cast ==
- Kevin Bacon as Tom Witzky
- Kathryn Erbe as Maggie Witzky
- Zachary David Cope as Jake Witzky
- Illeana Douglas as Lisa
- Jennifer Morrison as Samantha Kozac
- Liza Weil as Debbie Kozac
- Kevin Dunn as Frank McCarthy
- Lusia Strus as Sheila McCarthy
- Chalon Williams as Adam McCarthy
- Conor O'Farrell as Harry Damon
- Steve Rifkin as Kurt Damon
- Eddie Bo Smith Jr. as Neil

== Production ==
=== Development ===
The novel A Stir of Echoes was written by Richard Matheson, of whom director David Koepp is an avid fan. Koepp had decided he wanted his next project to be a horror film; his love for the screen-adapted Duel (1971), as well as Matheson's work on The Twilight Zone (1959), contributed to his decision to purchase a copy of A Stir of Echoes from a used bookstore. Producer Gavin Polone then secured the rights to the book. Koepp remembered being high-strung when approaching Matheson to ask for his thoughts on his script, terrified that the changes he made in the story might displease the author. Matheson, who expressed admiration for Koepp's directorial debut film The Trigger Effect (1996), responded positively to his draft and gave him his approval: "I'm sure he's done a good job of it. I do know what he's done before, and it's quite good. He has a very good touch". Among Koepp's influences for the film were Roman Polanski's Repulsion (1965) and Rosemary's Baby (1968), and David Cronenberg's The Dead Zone (1983).

=== Filming ===
The film was produced by Artisan Entertainment on a budget of $12 million. Principal photography took place in Chicago and lasted 39 days, in the period from October 5 to November 21, 1998. Director Brian De Palma paid the set a visit and offered Koepp some ideas, one of which was shooting a long take of Kevin Bacon during the first half of a long dialogue scene. Koepp shot the hypnosis scene, in which Bacon's character envisions himself in a theater and everything apart from the projection screen is painted black, as it was written in Matheson's book. Koepp felt that many hypnosis scenes in films are "skipped by", so he came up with the idea of allowing viewers to see through Bacon's point of view as he undergoes hypnosis to make the concept fresh. The theater from this sequence is located in Joliet, Illinois. Bacon's tooth extraction scene, which was inspired by a nightmare Koepp had about dying of age, was achieved with practical effects. Koepp told Entertainment Weekly:

We blacked out Kevin's tooth and built a cap to go over it, so he's pulling out a cap that comes off fairly easily, and he gives some grunts and groans and we added grotesque, crunching flesh noises… while he's pulling out the tooth, he's [also] palming a real tooth in his other hand [to drop into the sink]. He drops the real tooth, we tilt down to see it, and then somebody darted in [from off-camera] with a washcloth and wiped the blood off Kevin's face, so when he looks back up into the mirror, his face and teeth are clean.

== Release ==
Stir of Echoes was released in the United States by Artisan Entertainment on September 10, 1999. Lionsgate issued the film on Blu-ray on August 29, 2006. On December 17, 2024, Lionsgate issued the film on 4K UHD Blu-ray in a steelbook edition sold exclusively through Amazon.

=== Home media ===
Artisan Home Entertainment released the film on VHS and DVD in February 2000.

== Reception ==
=== Box office ===
On its opening weekend, the film ranked third in box office gross with $5,811,664, and stayed in the top ten for three weeks. After a 14-week run, its total domestic gross was $23,059,379.

=== Critical response ===
Many reviewers felt that the film suffered by being released shortly after previous high-earning occult films of the year: The Sixth Sense, The Blair Witch Project and The Mummy. Reviewer Sara Voorhees gave it "the benefit of the doubt, because the movie, or at least the story for it, appeared long before The Sixth Sense, in Richard Matheson's 1958 novel."

Roger Ebert wrote that Bacon "stars in one of his best performances" and that "Koepp's screenplay dovetails the supernatural stuff with developments among the neighbors which are, wisely, more sad and tragic than sensational." Empire, giving the film four out of five stars ("Excellent") wrote that "this quietly creepy adaptation of a Richard Matheson novel" was "[o]vershadowed at the American box office by The Sixth Sense" and adds, "There are neat camera tricks - the spook moves at a slightly different film speed to the living - and a couple of great bad dream moments, but the real skill Koepp shows is that he grounds the scary stuff in a believable reality and delivers a ghost story that doesn't lose its grip after the spirits have unambiguously been made manifest." The Seattle Post-Intelligencer wrote that "the film offers above-average occult entertainment" with Bacon's "most believable, heart-wrenching and charismatic lead performance in many years."

The San Antonio Express-News reviewer thought that Koepp "molds this ghastly ghost tale into a supernatural thriller that builds suspense at a fever pitch from beginning to end," while the reviewer for The Cincinnati Post, Voorhees, felt mixed, saying she thought the movie "too predictable" but also "a well-crafted psychological mystery"; "Koepp's dialogue is genuine and funny." The Baltimore Sun wrote, "Koepp and director of photography Fred Murphy have created some dazzling in-camera special effects, especially the ingenious idea of filming the story's ghost at a slow speed, six frames per second, giving the being a strange, otherworldly way of moving. If only they had sustained the suspense longer -- and resolved it in a less ripped-from-the-headlines manner -- they could have kept summer audiences scared sleepless for at least one more night." The Miami Herald reviewer wrote, "A good deal of effort was invested in setting up an atmosphere of mystery and dread: Stir of Echoes is a scream-out-loud movie, upsetting and deliriously effective. Problem is, Koepp relies almost entirely on the isolated shocking images, ignoring the human element at the center in favor of digitalized special effects and rapid-fire editing."

Contemporary review aggregation website Rotten Tomatoes offers a 70% approval rating from 113 critics—an average rating of 6.4 out of 10, which provides the consensus, "Kevin Bacon's acting is so genuine that it's creepy and director David Keopp [sic] knows how to create true suspense." The film also has a score of 67 out of 100 on Metacritic based on 30 critics indicating "generally favorable reviews". Audiences polled by CinemaScore during opening weekend gave the film an average grade of "B" on a scale ranging from A+ to F.

== Soundtrack ==
The original motion picture soundtrack album for Stir of Echoes was released by Nettwerk America on September 14, 1999.

1. James Newton Howard – Empty Couch (Original Score)
2. Moist – Breathe
3. James Newton Howard – Kidnapping Jake (Original Score)
4. Dishwalla – Stay Awake
5. James Newton Howard – Nightmare Lovemaking (Original Score)
6. Wild Strawberries – Mirror Mirror
7. James Newton Howard – Deja Vu (Original Score)
8. James Newton Howard – Digging (Original Score)
9. Steve Wynn – Nothing But The Shell
10. James Newton Howard – Neil (Original Score)
11. Gob – Paint It Black
12. James Newton Howard – Feathers (Original Score)
13. Poe – Hello
14. James Newton Howard – First Hypnotism (Original Score)
15. Beth Orton – It's Not The Spotlight

== Sequel ==
In 2007, Stir of Echoes: The Homecoming was released as an American television movie produced by Lions Gate Entertainment. The film premiered on the Sci Fi Channel. Originally titled The Dead Speak, it was written and directed by Ernie Barbarash and its only connection to the previous work is the inclusion of Jake Witzky, who had a key role in the original film but is only a secondary character here.

== See also ==
- List of ghost films
