= The X-Files season 6 =

Season of television series

The X-Files
- Season 6
- DVD cover
- Starring: David Duchovny; Gillian Anderson
- No. of episodes: 22

Release
- Original network: Fox
- Original release: November 8, 1998 – May 16, 1999

Season chronology
- ← Previous; Season 5 Next → Season 7

The sixth season of the science fiction television series The X-Files commenced airing on the Fox network in the United States on November 8, 1998, concluding on the same channel on May 16, 1999, and consisted of twenty-two episodes. The season continued from the 1998 feature film and focused heavily on FBI federal agents Fox Mulder (David Duchovny) and Dana Scully's (Gillian Anderson) separation from the X-Files Division and the demise of the Syndicate—a "shadow government" group attempting to cover up the existence of extraterrestrials—in the two-part episode "Two Fathers" and "One Son".

The season was the first to be filmed in Los Angeles, after production was moved from Vancouver, British Columbia, Canada. This move was done largely at the behest of Duchovny, who wished to be closer to his wife, Téa Leoni. Series creator Chris Carter opposed the move, although series director Kim Manners and Anderson approved of it, although to a less-vocal degree than Duchovny. The first half of the season also saw Mimi Rogers and Chris Owens' characters—Diana Fowley and Jeffrey Spender, respectively—become recurring characters.

Despite debuting with high viewing figures and ranking as the twelfth most watched television series during the 1998–99 television year, the season saw a slight decrease in ratings from the previous one, a trend that would continue until its final year. The season received mixed to positive reviews from television critics; some critics and fans were alienated by the show, due to the different tone taken by most standalone episodes after the move to Los Angeles. Rather than adhering to the previous style of "monsters of the week", they were often romantic, humorous, or a combination of both.

== Plot overview ==
In Washington, D.C., Agent Fox Mulder appears before an FBI panel regarding his experiences in Antarctica. Assistant Director Walter Skinner (Mitch Pileggi) tells Mulder that he and Scully have been denied reassignment to the division. Mulder goes to his former basement office, only to discover that Jeffrey Spender (Chris Owens) and Diana Fowley (Mimi Rogers) have been assigned to the X-Files. Going against orders, Mulder and Scully track down an escaped alien in Phoenix, Arizona while Cigarette Smoking Man (William B. Davis) gives chase. Mulder and Scully eventually discover that Cigarette Smoking Man has been using Gibson Praise to locate the creature. Scully brings Gibson to the hospital, where it is determined that he has the alien virus in his blood. Later, Skinner is mysteriously poisoned by a nanorobot infection. The culprit is revealed to be Alex Krycek (Nicholas Lea), a rogue FBI agent who formerly worked for the Syndicate, who continues to control the potentially debilitating nanotechnology in Skinner's system in order to achieve his goals.

Mulder and Scully later learn of reports of rebel aliens burning doctors who were working on Cassandra Spender (Veronica Cartwright), an alien abductee and mother of Jeffrey Spender. Skinner takes Spender to the scene, where Cassandra asks for Mulder. She informs Mulder and Scully that the aliens are here to destroy all life on Earth. She claims that a rebel force of aliens are mutilating their faces to prevent infection by the black oil. Cigarette Smoking Man reveals everything to Diana Fowley, who agrees to help him and betray Mulder. Cassandra later escapes from a hospital and arrives at Mulder's apartment, demanding that he shoot her because she is the embodiment of fifty years of work by the Syndicate—an alien-human hybrid that will trigger colonization if the aliens learn of her existence.

Fowley arrives and forcibly takes Mulder, Cassandra, and Scully to a CDC facility at Fort Marlene. There, Mulder runs into Marita Covarrubias (Laurie Holden). Marita tells Mulder that she was subjected to Syndicate-run black oil vaccine tests. Meanwhile, the Syndicate rendezvous at a checkpoint, preparing to be taken away by the Colonists, who are prepping for invasion. However, they are met by the alien rebels, who incinerate them all, including Cassandra; Cigarette Smoking Man and Fowley escape. Jeffrey Spender is then purportedly killed by Cigarette Smoking Man.

Several months later, a metallic artifact with inscriptions is discovered on the beach of Côte d'Ivoire in Africa. After Mulder examines rubbings of the object, he begins suffering from a headache, seemingly caused by the rubbings. Mulder's condition worsens, but he gains telepathic abilities. Chuck Burks (Bill Dow) tells them that the symbols on the artifact are Navajo. Eventually, Mulder passes into an aggravated delusional state and is placed under observation at a hospital. Hoping to find an answer, Scully rushes to Côte d'Ivoire and finds the massive wreck of a large spacecraft partially buried in the beach.

== Production ==
=== Background ===
After five successful seasons of The X-Files, series creator Chris Carter wanted to tell the story of the series on a wider scale, which ultimately meant creating a feature film: the 1998 X-Files movie. The film grossed US$83,898,313 in the US and $105,278,110 abroad, giving a total worldwide gross of $189,176,423. In its opening weekend, showing at 2,629 theaters, it earned $30,138,758 which was 35.9% of its total gross. Initially, the fifth season of The X-Files was supposed to be the show's last. However, the series proved to be so lucrative for Fox that two additional seasons were ordered. Thus, the sixth season of the show began filming.

=== Development ===
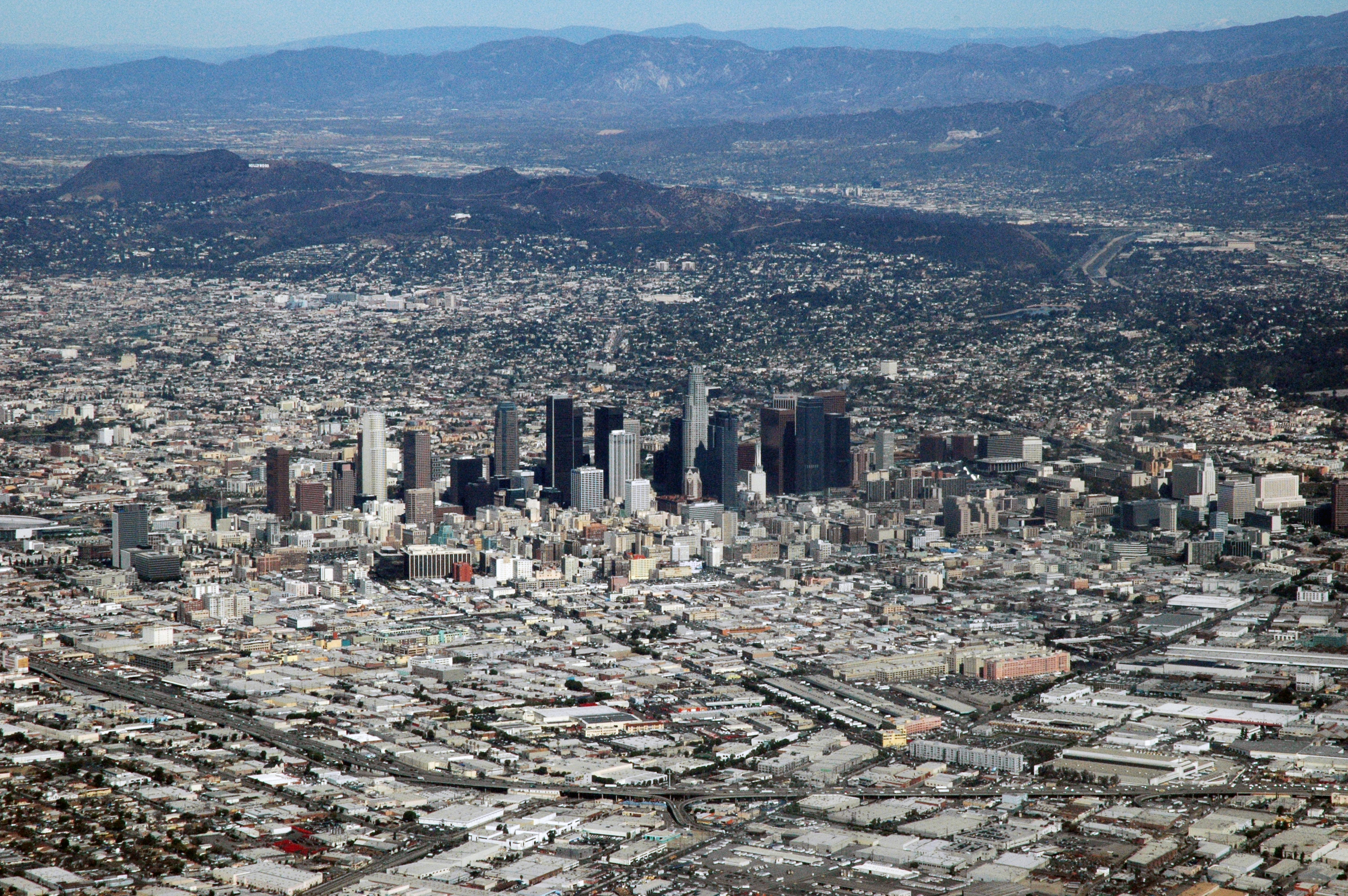
The sixth season of The X-Files was filmed in Los Angeles.

After five seasons in Vancouver, British Columbia, Canada, production of The X-Files moved to Los Angeles. "The Beginning" was the first episode of the series to be filmed in Los Angeles, California. The move was instigated by David Duchovny, who portrayed Mulder, in order to increase his opportunity to find movie work as well as to give him a chance to be nearer to his wife, Téa Leoni. Series creator Chris Carter opposed the move; others, like series director Kim Manners and Gillian Anderson supported the move but were less vocal than Duchovny. Fox network officials eventually made the decision to film in California. According to Andy Meisler, "The very first shot of the season, a long look directly into a bright sun shining on a barren desert, was designed to boldly announce the show's arrival in Southern California." As a result of the move, the episode featured a largely new group of crew members, hired by Carter, Frank Spotnitz and new co-executive producer Michael Watkins; this necessitated the show's new crewmembers spending five weeks, receiving, unpacking, and cataloging filming material from their Vancouver counterparts. Because of the shift from Vancouver to Los Angeles, some fans of the series were alienated. Many accused the show of "Hollywood-izing" the series by adding notable guest stars as well as making the plots simpler and more enjoyable for larger audiences. According to Space.com, a number of fans of the show specifically loved "the moody ambiance filming around Vancouver lent the series [during seasons 1–5]", which the sixth season reportedly lacked.

The move to Los Angeles also meant a drastic price increase for the series. Bruce Harwood, who played Lone Gunman John Fitzgerald Byers noted, "At the time, the exchange rate between Canadian and U.S. dollars was pretty dramatic. Somebody told me that the cost per episode doubled, even tripled, once they moved". In addition, the move further reduced the amount of expensive special effects the series was able to produce. Writer Vince Gilligan explained "everything in Los Angeles is more expensive across the board. […] It became apparent very quickly to me that we were no longer going to have things such as nuclear submarines descending through the ice and trains exploding in the middle of the woods".

=== Crew ===
Series creator Chris Carter also served as executive producer and showrunner and wrote five episodes. Spotnitz was promoted to executive producer and wrote five episodes, and wrote the story for a further two episodes. Vince Gilligan was promoted to co-executive producer and wrote seven episodes. John Shiban was promoted to producer and wrote six episodes, and wrote the story for one other episode. New writers in the sixth season included David Amann who joined as executive story editor and wrote two episodes, and Jeffrey Bell who also wrote two episodes. Freelance episodes were written by Daniel Arkin and Jim Guttridge, and a further episode was written by Ken Hawryliw, who was the series' property master from 1993 to 1998. Duchovny also wrote his first episode solo, as he previously collaborated with various writers, including Chris Carter, on three other episodes. Other producers included producer Paul Rabwin, co-producer Lori Jo Nemhauser, and Bernadette Caulfield who joined as producer.

Producing-directors for the show included producer Rob Bowman, producer Manners, co-executive producer Michael Watkins, and consulting producer Daniel Sackheim, who together directed the bulk of the season's episodes. Manners directed seven episodes, Bowman directed six, Watkins directed three, and Sackheim directed one. Series creator Chris Carter directed two episodes, while cast member David Duchovny directed his first episode of the series. The remaining two episodes were directed by Peter Markle and Bryan Spicer.

== Cast ==
=== Main cast ===
==== Starring ====
- David Duchovny as Special Agent Fox Mulder (Note: Duchovny only contributes his voice to "Three of a Kind".)
- Gillian Anderson as Special Agent Dana Scully

==== Also starring ====
- Mitch Pileggi as Assistant Director Walter Skinner
- Chris Owens as Jeffrey Spender
- William B. Davis as Cigarette Smoking Man
- Nicholas Lea as Alex Krycek

=== Recurring cast ===
- James Pickens Jr. as Assistant Director Alvin Kersh
- Tom Braidwood as Melvin Frohike
- Dean Haglund as Richard Langly
- Bruce Harwood as John Fitzgerald Byers
- Mimi Rogers as Diana Fowley
- Michael McKean as Morris Fletcher
- Don S. Williams as First Elder

=== Guest cast ===
- Wayne Alexander as Assistant Director G. Arnold
- Wendie Malick as Assistant Director J. Maslin
- Veronica Cartwright as Cassandra Spender
- George Murdock as Second Elder
- Peter Donat as William Mulder
- Jeff Gulka as Gibson Praise
- Laurie Holden as Marita Covarrubias
- Brian Thompson as Alien Bounty Hunter
- Floyd Westerman as Albert Hosteen

== Episodes ==
Episodes marked with a double dagger (‡) are episodes in the series' Alien Mythology arc. (Note: The episodes were included in the DVD collection The X-Files Mythology, Volume 3 – Colonization, released by Fox.)

No. overall	No. in season	Title	Directed by	Written by	Original release date	Prod. code	U.S. viewers (millions)
118	1	"The Beginning"‡	Kim Manners	Chris Carter	November 8, 1998	6ABX01	20.34
With the X-Files reopened, Fox Mulder and Dana Scully eagerly hunt for a deadly creature in the Arizona desert. What they find seems to support Mulder's revived belief in aliens, but is discredited when the agents are not reassigned to the X-Files, with Jeffrey Spender and Diana Fowley taking over instead.
119	2	"Drive"	Rob Bowman	Vince Gilligan	November 15, 1998	6ABX02	18.48
With Mulder trapped in a car by a seemingly deranged man, Scully races to determine if the man is suffering from a deadly illness—and if Mulder is in danger of becoming the next victim of a government virus.
120	3	"Triangle"	Chris Carter	Chris Carter	November 22, 1998	6ABX03	18.20
Mulder goes in search of a ship that disappeared in the Bermuda Triangle in 1939. But when he gets on board, Mulder finds that he—and all the passengers and crew (including some strangely familiar faces)—are still stuck in the past.
121	4	"Dreamland"	Rob Bowman	Vince Gilligan & John Shiban & Frank Spotnitz	November 29, 1998	6ABX04	17.48
An anonymous tip finally brings Mulder and Scully to the mecca of all UFO lore—Area 51. As the agents are accosted by suited personnel from the base, they witness the flight of a mysterious craft. In doing so, the lives of two of the men present are profoundly—and perhaps irrevocably—altered.
122	5	"Dreamland II"	Michael Watkins	Vince Gilligan & John Shiban & Frank Spotnitz	December 6, 1998	6ABX05	17.01
Scully begins to suspect that her partner's strange behavior is more than it appears to be, while Mulder fights to return his life to normal before it's too late.
123	6	"How the Ghosts Stole Christmas"	Chris Carter	Chris Carter	December 13, 1998	6ABX08	17.31
On Christmas Eve, Mulder convinces Scully to put aside her gift wrapping and stake out a reputed haunted house. But they discover a pair of lovelorn specters, Maurice and Lyda, living inside the house who are determined to prove how lonely the holidays can be.
124	7	"Terms of Endearment"	Rob Bowman	David Amann	January 3, 1999	6ABX06	18.69
When a mother is accused of killing her unborn child, Mulder and Scully discover that the father, Wayne, has his own secrets – and he's not the only one.
125	8	"The Rain King"	Kim Manners	Jeffrey Bell	January 10, 1999	6ABX07	21.24
In a small town plagued by drought, Mulder and Scully come upon a man who claims to be able to control the weather—at a hefty profit. Yet the agents discover a force of nature at work even more powerful than the weather, and just as unpredictable.
126	9	"S.R. 819"‡	Daniel Sackheim	John Shiban	January 17, 1999	6ABX10	15.65
Assistant Director Walter Skinner is poisoned. Mulder and Scully have 24 hours to save him, but in order to do so, they must determine who wants him dead, and why.
127	10	"Tithonus"	Michael Watkins	Vince Gilligan	January 24, 1999	6ABX09	15.83
Scully learns that she, but not Mulder, is being given a chance to prove her worth at the FBI, and—paired with a new partner—she investigates a crime scene photographer with an uncanny knack for arriving just in time to see his victims' final moments. What she does not expect is for Death to play a role itself.
128	11	"Two Fathers"‡	Kim Manners	Chris Carter & Frank Spotnitz	February 7, 1999	6ABX11	18.81
When Cassandra Spender is returned, Mulder, Scully, and Agent Spender find themselves facing the exposure of the conspiracy involving extraterrestrials; the worried Syndicate take drastic evasive measures.
129	12	"One Son"‡	Rob Bowman	Chris Carter & Frank Spotnitz	February 14, 1999	6ABX12	16.57
While Cassandra reveals the truth about the alien conspiracy to Mulder, her ex-husband—The Cigarette Smoking Man—does the same to Agent Spender in an effort to convince him to work with the conspiracy. As events force the Syndicate to expedite its ultimate plans, Mulder and Scully scramble to stop them.
130	13	"Agua Mala"	Rob Bowman	David Amann	February 21, 1999	6ABX14	16.91
Mulder and Scully are looking forward to cases again. Instead, Arthur Dales, now living in a Florida trailer park, calls the agents for help when a neighboring family disappears; and, with a hurricane approaching, Mulder and Scully find themselves trapped with a group of residents in a building where there is something in the water.
131	14	"Monday"	Kim Manners	Vince Gilligan & John Shiban	February 28, 1999	6ABX15	16.74
The world is trapped in a time loop, and only one woman seems to know—A bank robbery is committed over and over again until they can stop the eventual bombing of the place from occurring.
132	15	"Arcadia"	Michael Watkins	Daniel Arkin	March 7, 1999	6ABX13	17.91
Several disappearances at an idyllic planned community lead Mulder and Scully to go undercover as a married couple. However, they soon discover that the president of the homeowners' association takes the community covenants and regulations more seriously than they could have imagined.
133	16	"Alpha"	Peter Markle	Jeffrey Bell	March 28, 1999	6ABX16	17.67
An Asian dog, called the Wanshang Dhole—thought to be extinct—is blamed for several killings. Mulder and Scully join an obstinate Sheriff, a seemingly eccentric hunter, and a reclusive canine expert to find it. However, there is more mystery to the expert than meets the eye.
134	17	"Trevor"	Rob Bowman	Jim Guttridge & Ken Hawryliw	April 11, 1999	6ABX17	17.65
After a prison camp is destroyed by a tornado, an escaped inmate is suspected of killing the warden. Mulder and Scully set out to find him and discover that he has the ability to pass through conductive materials.
135	18	"Milagro"	Kim Manners	Story by : John Shiban & Frank Spotnitz; Teleplay by : Chris Carter	April 18, 1999	6ABX18	15.20
A series of murders takes place where the heart has been removed from the victims. A writer that lives next door to Mulder is writing a novel about the murders before they actually happen. Scully finds herself confused and drawn to the writer, who has a romantic interest in her.
136	19	"The Unnatural"	David Duchovny	David Duchovny	April 25, 1999	6ABX20	16.88
While working in Roswell, New Mexico in 1947, a young cop, Arthur Dales (the brother of the Arthur Dales who started the X-Files) stumbles across Josh Exley, a black baseball player who is actually an alien with a love of the game hiding among humans.
137	20	"Three of a Kind"	Bryan Spicer	Vince Gilligan & John Shiban	May 2, 1999	6ABX19	12.94
While at a conference in Las Vegas, The Lone Gunmen run into the enigmatic Susanne Modeski. After deceiving Scully into joining them, the trio soon find out that Susanne's fiancé is planning to use her new brainwashing drug for political assassinations.
138	21	"Field Trip"	Kim Manners	Story by : Frank Spotnitz; Teleplay by : John Shiban & Vince Gilligan	May 9, 1999	6ABX21	15.38
The skeletonized remains of a young couple are found in the fields of North Carolina. When Mulder and Scully go to investigate, they find that a giant fungal life form releases an LSD-like drug into the air with spores, and then slowly digests its victims. Mulder and Scully fall into its trap and are not sure of what is reality and what is fantasy.
139	22	"Biogenesis"‡	Rob Bowman	Chris Carter & Frank Spotnitz	May 16, 1999	6ABX22	15.86
Mulder believes that metallic objects discovered in Africa are proof that life originated elsewhere in the universe. Skinner, now in contact with Alex Krycek and Diana Fowley, begins monitoring Mulder and Scully on the case. Mulder, due to the apparent influence of the artifact, falls mentally ill, which leads to Scully traveling to Africa alone.

== Reception ==
=== Ratings ===
The sixth season of The X-Files debuted with "The Beginning" on November 8, 1998. This episode earned a Nielsen rating of 11.9, with a 17 share, meaning that roughly 11.9 percent of all television-equipped households, and 17 percent of households watching television, were tuned in to the episode. The episode was viewed by 20.34 million people, a marked increase from the fifth season's finale, "The End", which was viewed by 18.76 million viewers. However, the debut marked a drastic decrease from the fifth season debut, "Redux", which garnered 27.34 million viewers. As the season continued, ratings continued to drop. The last episode of The X-Files to reach over 20 million viewers was "The Rain King", which attracted 21.24 million. The season hit its nadir with the eighteenth episode, "Milagro", which was viewed by 15.20 million viewers. The season finale, "Biogenesis", earned a Nielsen rating of 9.4, with a 14 share, and was viewed by 15.86 million viewers, marking a 22 percent drop in viewers when compared to the season premiere, (Note: "Biogenesis" was viewed by 15.86 whereas "The Beginning" was viewed by 20.34 million viewers. Subtracting the two figures and then dividing them by 20.34 million, which represents the largest possible audience, yields a percent decrease of 22 percent.) and a 15.5 percent drop in viewers when compared to the previous season finale. (Note: "Biogenesis" was viewed by 15.86 whereas "The End" was viewed by 18.76 million viewers. Subtracting the two figures and then dividing them by 18.76 million, which represents the largest possible audience, yields a percent decrease of 15.5 percent.) The season ranked as the twelfth most watched television series during the 1998–1999 season, with an average of 16.39 million viewers. (Note: This number is determined by adding up all the viewer numbers for season six given in The End and the Beginning: The Official Guide to the X-Files and finding the mean average.)

=== Reviews ===
The season received positive reviews from television critics. However some fans were alienated by the show in its sixth season, due to the different tone taken by most stand-alone episodes after the move to Los Angeles. Rather than adhering to the previous style of "monsters of the week", they were often romantic, humorous, or a combination of both. Several episodes—"Dreamland" and "The Rain King" in particular—were criticized for their reliance on humor or for their lighter stories. Fans on the internet began calling the less-scary episodes "X-Files Lite". Other episodes were derided for their mediocrity. Paula Vitaris from Cinefantastique called the episode "Alpha" a "run-of-the-mill monster-of-the-week episode". Robert Shearman and Lars Pearson, in their book Wanting to Believe: A Critical Guide to The X-Files, Millennium & The Lone Gunmen, called the episode "Trevor" "The X-Files at its most generic".

However, not all the sixth-season episodes were poorly received. The season's third episode, "Triangle" was largely lauded as a masterpiece by critics. The episode, which was shot in real time to look like it was filmed in four uninterrupted eleven-minute takes, was called a "classic" standalone episode and one of the "highlights of season six". The "Two Fathers"/"One Son" story-arc, which featured the destruction of the Syndicate, was called one "of the most coherent, [...] almost unbearably tense, hours in the series' run" by one critic. Finally, the Duchovny-penned "The Unnatural", which featured the story of an alien who fell in love with baseball, was praised by critics for its plot, directing, and originality. One review praised Duchovny's directing "excellence" while another referred to its ending as "heartbreaking".

=== Accolades ===
The sixth season earned the series eight Primetime Emmy Award nominations, with one win. It won for Outstanding Makeup for a Series for the episodes "Two Fathers" and "One Son". Gillian Anderson received her fourth and final nomination for Outstanding Lead Actress in a Drama Series, and Veronica Cartwright received her second consecutive nomination for Outstanding Guest Actress in a Drama Series. Other nominations included Bill Roe for Outstanding Cinematography for a Series, Mark Snow for Outstanding Music Composition for a Series (Dramatic Underscore), Heather MacDougall for Outstanding Single Camera Picture Editing for a Series, Outstanding Art Direction for a Series, and Outstanding Sound Editing for a Series. This was the final season the series received Golden Globe nominations, with Gillian Anderson, David Duchovny and the series as a whole receiving nominations.

== DVD release ==
The X-Files – The Complete Sixth Season
Set details		Special features
22 episodes; 7-disc set; 1.78:1 aspect ratio; Subtitles: English, Spanish; English (Dolby 2.0 Surround)		"The Truth About Season Six" Documentary; "Behind the Scenes" featurette; Audio Commentaries (Dolby Digital 2.0 Stereo); "Triangle" – Chris Carter; "Milagro" – Kim Manners; 13 special effects clips; 15 deleted scenes; Character profiles; 44 promotional television spots; DVD-ROM game
Release dates
Region 1	Region 2	Region 4
November 5, 2002	March 17, 2003	May 13, 2003

== Bibliography ==
- Hurwitz, Matt; Knowles, Chris (2008). The Complete X-Files. Insight Editions. ISBN 978-1-933784-80-9.
- Kessenich, Tom (2002). Examination: An Unauthorized Look at Seasons 6–9 of the X-Files. Trafford Publishing. ISBN 1-55369-812-6.
- Meisler, Andy (2000). The End and the Beginning: The Official Guide to the X-Files Season 6. HarperCollins. ISBN 0-06-107595-7.
- Meisler, Andy (1999). Resist or Serve: The Official Guide to The X-Files, Vol. 4. London: HarperCollins. ISBN 0-00-257133-1. OCLC 42005360.
