= Redux (The X-Files) =

- The X-Files episodes
- The so-called "fake" aliens
- Episode nos.: Season 5 Episodes 1 & 2
- Directed by: R. W. Goodwin ("Redux"); Kim Manners ("Redux II")
- Written by: Chris Carter
- Production codes: 5X02; 5X03
- Original air dates: November 2, 1997; November 9, 1997
- Running time: 44 minutes ("Redux"); 46 minutes ("Redux II")

Guest appearances
- Mitch Pileggi as Walter Skinner; William B. Davis as Cigarette Smoking Man; Charles Cioffi as Scott Blevins; John Finn as Michael Kritschgau; Steve Makaj as Scott Ostelhoff; Barry W. Levy as Vitagliano; Willy Ross as "Quiet Willy"; Ken Camroux as Senior Agent; Don S. Williams as First Elder; Bruce Harwood as John Fitzgerald Byers; Dean Haglund as Richard Langly; Tom Braidwood as Melvin Frohike; Julia Arkos as Holly; John D. Sampson as Sentry; Robert Wright as Dr. Zuckerman; Arnie Walter as Father McCue; Megan Leitch as Samantha Mulder; Sheila Larken as Margaret Scully; Pat Skipper as Bill Scully Jr.

Episode chronology
← Previous "Gethsemane"	Next → "Unusual Suspects"
- The X-Files season 5

"Redux" is the two-part fifth season premiere of the science fiction television series The X-Files. "Redux" first aired on November 2, 1997, on Fox in the United States, with "Redux II" airing on November 9. Both episodes subsequently aired in the United Kingdom and Ireland. Both episodes were written by series creator Chris Carter, with "Redux" directed by R. W. Goodwin and "Redux II" helmed by Kim Manners. "Redux" became the second-most-watched episode ever broadcast, earning more than 27 million viewers in the United States alone. The first part of the episode received mixed to negative reviews, whereas the second part received mixed to positive reviews from critics.

The show centers on FBI special agents Fox Mulder (David Duchovny) and Dana Scully (Gillian Anderson) who work on cases linked to the paranormal, called X-files. The episodes' story continues on from the fourth season finale "Gethsemane". "Redux" follows Scully, who helps Mulder to fake his own death in an effort to discover which members of the FBI they can trust before the agents individually search for an answer to Scully's cancer. "Redux II" continues immediately afterwards with Scully hospitalized, and Mulder is offered a deal to ally with the Cigarette Smoking Man (William B. Davis).

"Redux", being a part of a three-part episode arc, became a storyline milestone for the series. It marked the first episode in which Fox Mulder loses his belief in extraterrestrial life and the revelation that someone inside the FBI has tried to discredit Mulder and Scully's work on the X-files. "Redux" and "Redux II" continued the series' black oil mythology, following the earlier episodes "Piper Maru", "Apocrypha", "Tunguska", "Terma", "Zero Sum", and "Gethsemane". When writing the episode, Carter wanted to tie up loose ends from the previous seasons. Despite being the first two episodes of the season that aired, they were the second and third episodes produced, the first being "Unusual Suspects", which explained the origins of The Lone Gunmen.

== Plot ==
=== Background ===
In Canada's Saint Elias Mountains, a frozen extraterrestrial body is discovered by an expedition team. Professor Arlinsky, the team's leader, sends ice core samples containing presumably alien DNA to Fox Mulder (David Duchovny). Both Mulder and Dana Scully (Gillian Anderson) eventually meet Michael Kritschgau (John Finn), a Defense Department employee who claims that everything Mulder thinks he knows about aliens is a lie. Kritschgau tells Mulder that his sister Samantha's abduction was fabricated, that all evidence of alien biology are merely scientific anomalies, and that the alien body discovered in Canada was fake. He also claims that the entire alien mythos is a hoax perpetrated by the U.S. government as a cover for the military–industrial complex. Distraught by these claims, Mulder loses his faith. Later, the FBI investigates Mulder's apparent suicide. Scully confirms the unseen body's identity.

=== Redux ===
As a distraught Mulder sits in his apartment, he receives a phone call from Kritschgau, who tells him that "they" may be listening. Mulder, spotting a small hole in his ceiling, rushes upstairs, bursts into the apartment above his, and kills government employee Scott Ostelhoff. He tells Scully about the incident, telling her that Ostelhoff had made numerous calls to the FBI. The Bureau looks into the situation and finds Ostelhoff's body; however, they believe it is the body of a suicidal Mulder. Scully falsely identifies the body and is met by Assistant Director Walter Skinner (Mitch Pileggi), who tells her that Section Chief Scott Blevins (Charles Cioffi) is looking for her. She meets with Blevins and his panel, and tells them about the previous incidents leading to Mulder's apparent suicide.

As Mulder breaks into the Department of Defense, the Smoking Man (William B. Davis) searches his apartment, believing he is not dead. Scully does some research into Ostelhoff's records, coming to the conclusion that he was calling Skinner. Meanwhile, Mulder finds a room containing fake alien bodies and follows a tunnel to the Pentagon, where he finds a vast evidence room. Mulder ultimately tracks down a small metal vial that he believes may contain a cure to Scully's cancer. Scully explains to the FBI panel that Mulder was a victim of an elaborate conspiracy and that she was given a fatal disease by someone in the room. As she is about to present her evidence, her nose bleeds and she collapses. Mulder takes the vial to the Lone Gunmen, who tell him it is not a cure, only deionized water.

=== Redux II ===
After hearing of Scully collapsing, Mulder arrives at the hospital where she is being treated. Before he is able to make contact with her, he is detained by Skinner and two FBI agents. Mulder is then brought to Blevins and a senior agent, who demand information on why Scully lied about his death. After the meeting, Mulder tells Skinner that a traitor in the FBI gave Scully her cancer. Meanwhile, the Smoking Man tries to convince the First Elder (Don S. Williams) that Mulder will join their side if he is given a good reason to do so.

Mulder later tells Scully that he wants to reveal the conspiracy to the public. As he is leaving, he meets with the Smoking Man, who claims that he can cure Scully by using a chip inside Mulder's stolen vial. Meanwhile, Kritschgau goes before the FBI panel, denying any knowledge of Ostelhoff's murderer, also revealing that his son died that morning. He claims to work for not only the Defense Department, but also a congressional lobbying firm known as Roush. Mulder tells Scully and her doctor about the chip. Scully's family is skeptical, particularly her brother Bill. Scully decides to go ahead and have the chip inserted in her neck.

The Smoking Man arranges a meeting with Mulder at a nearby diner. There, Mulder meets his sister Samantha, who calls the Smoking Man her "father". Samantha claims to not remember anything about her abduction, and is reluctant to stay or tell Mulder where he can find her. The next day, the Smoking Man offers Mulder the truth if he quits the FBI and comes to work for him; Mulder refuses. Mulder later meets with Blevins, who claims he has evidence that Skinner was withholding information concerning Ostelhoff's death. Blevins tells Mulder he can help him if he names Skinner as the traitor in the FBI. Later, Mulder meets with Scully, telling her he was going to make the deal with the Smoking Man, but now will not after his meeting with Blevins. Despite Scully's pleas, he refuses to betray Skinner.

Mulder appears before the FBI panel while an armed Quiet Willy follows the Smoking Man. Mulder tells the panel of the conspiracy against him and Scully. Questioned by Blevins and the senior agent about whether he killed Ostelhoff, Mulder instead names Blevins as the traitor. The Smoking Man, looking at a picture of a young Mulder and Samantha, is shot by Quiet Willy. Blevins is killed by the senior agent in his office, who stages it as a suicide. At the hospital, Skinner tells Mulder that the Smoking Man is dead, although his body hasn't been found. Mulder admits that he guessed when he named Blevins, whom Skinner reveals was on the payroll for Roush. Mulder tells Skinner that Scully's cancer has gone into remission.

== Production ==
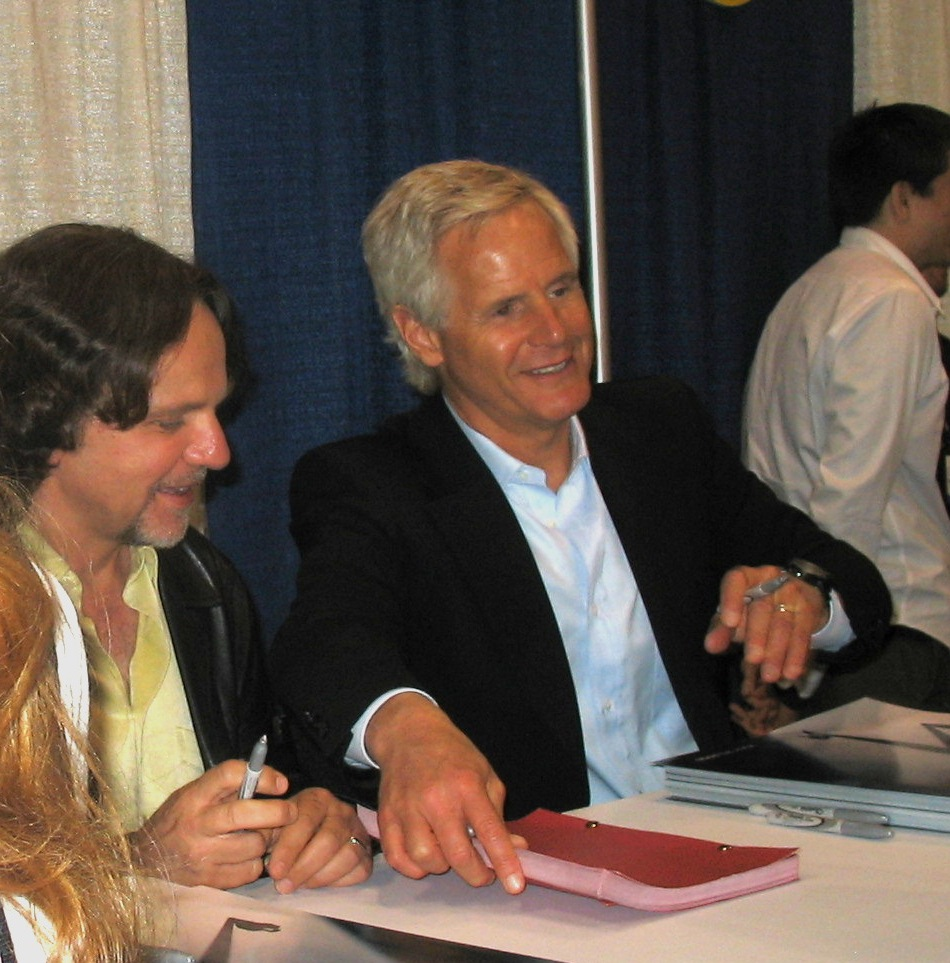
Chris Carter (right), the writer of both parts of the episode, pictured in 2008

Series creator Chris Carter, when talking about "Redux" and "Redux II", said that he "wanted to tie up a lot of loose ends from the past season, and play the idea that the conspiracy is a hoax and that it had been done to hide various terrestrial and temporal misdeeds". Consequently, these episodes started a story arc about Fox Mulder's loss of belief in extraterrestrials, which would be concluded in the episode, "The Red and the Black". While the writers kept "playing" with the idea of Mulder's loss of faith, executive producer Frank Spotnitz admits that fans never seemed to accept this turn of events and they refused to see the Cigarette Smoking Man victorious. Reflecting this main plot of the episode, the tagline for "Redux" is changed to "All Lies Lead to the Truth".

Another important facet of the episode deals with Scully's cancer and remission. According to executive producer Frank Spotnitz, "Redux" posits a number of reasons for Scully's recovery, including standard medical treatment, divine intervention engendered by faith, or the chip that the Cigarette Smoking Man offers up. A clear-cut answer is never really provided, which John Shiban claims was intentional, as they wanted to leave it open to interpretation. According to Carter, this entire plot took "the idea of the show" and spun it "in the most interesting way".

According to R. W. Goodwin (the director of "Redux"), the production crew was so impressed by actor John Finn's monologue claiming that UFOs are a government hoax that he received a round of applause after finishing his takes. The script for this speech was particularly long, with Goodwin comparing it to "the yellow pages". The original versions of the "Redux" script featured "Gray-Haired Man" (played by Morris Panych) in the place of "Quiet Willy". However, when Panych was unable to appear in the episode due to scheduling issues, the story was rewritten and the new character was created, portrayed by Willy Ross (né Steve Allen).

Despite being the season premiere, the two parts of "Redux" were the second and third episodes produced of the season, respectively, due to David Duchovny and Gillian Anderson being needed for filming on The X-Files movie. After production wrapped, "Redux II" in particular was highly praised by the cast and crew: Carter said, "I think that Redux II is one of the best episodes we've ever done". Likewise, Spotnitz called "Redux II" "one of [his] favorite episodes" and explained, "I think the story has a crystal purity and clarity, and it just comes to a perfect point for me". Anderson, too, said, "I thought it was a terrific episode, especially the scenes in the hearing room, and the whole progression of Scully praying. How it was written and shot and how it was edited. Fabulous".

== Reception ==
"The aliens don't really matter, just as it doesn't matter if Scully's god is God, or just her faith in the essential meaning of her own suffering. What matters is that true belief, the best sort of belief, is the belief that takes us closer to who we want to be, to our best selves."

— Zack Handlen, on the episode's theme of faith.

=== Ratings ===
"Redux" first aired on November 2, 1997, on Fox in the United States, with "Redux II" airing on November 9. "Redux" earned a Nielsen rating of 16.1, with a 22 share. It was viewed by 27.34 million people. It was the highest rated episode of the season, and the second highest watched episode, in terms of viewers, after "Leonard Betts", which aired after Super Bowl XXXI. "Redux II" earned a Nielsen rating of 15.0, with a 21 share. It was viewed by 24.84 million people. Part of the reason "Redux" was so widely viewed was because the show's previous episode, "Gethsemane", had created speculation about whether or not Mulder was actually dead. An article in The Wall Street Journal discussed fan theories behind Mulder's madness, while a cartoon ran in The New Yorker a few weeks later surrounding Mulder's "death".

=== Reviews ===
"Redux" received mixed to negative reviews from critics. Emily VanDerWerff, writing for The A.V. Club, awarded the first episode a "C+" rating and wrote that "'Redux [Part 1]' was a pretty good episode back in 1997. It's not a very good episode now". VanDerWerff noted that the idea that Mulder had killed himself was not effective, because the show's audience knew that a movie had been scheduled for release in the summer of 1998. Finally, she called the episode's ending "one of the show's weaker cliffhangers". Paula Vitaris from Cinefantastique gave the first part of the episode a negative review and awarded it one star out of four. She heavily criticized the story's pacing, noting that the episode "is all plot, plot, plot. [And] much of the plot is unbelievable." Furthermore, Vitaris criticized several plot holes in the episode, including Mulder's easy entrance into the Department of Defense and the character's antics, such as his attack on Ostelhoff. However, despite the overall negative review, Vitaris did mention that, "There's only one truly galvanizing scene, as that's the confrontation between Scully and Skinner after he follows her to the lab where she is performing her DNA test." Robert Shearman and Lars Pearson, in their book Wanting to Believe: A Critical Guide to The X-Files, Millennium & The Lone Gunmen, rated the episode one star out of five. The two heavily criticized the "Skinner-as-traitor" plot, noting sardonically that "the production team aren't going to do [reveal he is the antagonist], and the shock 'villain in the room' reveal will be Section Chief Blevins–a character so important in the framework of the series that, barring his appearance in the Season Four finale, we haven't seen him in ninety-four episodes." Not all reviews were so negative. Tom Kessenich, in his book Examination: An Unauthorized Look at Seasons 6–9 of the X-Files named "Redux" and "Redux II", together, as the tenth best "Episode of All Time". In his critique of "Redux", he noted "While many people don't care for 'Redux', I think it does a good job of preparing us for the second hour (although, it invalidates Gillian's emotional context from the S4 finale)." In the 1999 FX Thanksgiving Marathon, containing fan-selected episodes, "Redux" (along with "Gethsemane" and "Redux II") was presented as the "Best Mythology Episode".

"Redux II" received mixed to positive reviews from critics. Zack Handlen of The A.V. Club awarded the episode an "A" rating and noted that "whatever reservations I may have over a three-episode story arc, this final entry does a good job of re-investing us in the show's basic ideals, returning us to a rough form of the status quo in a way that's exciting, emotionally powerful, and satisfying despite only incremental forward momentum". In addition, Handlen praised David Duchovny's performance, stating that he "was on fire the whole episode". Tom Kessenich praised the second part of the episode and wrote "'Redux II' is the standout hour of the two without question. With Scully on her deathbed, Mulder meets his sister only to lose her again and is put in a position where he may deal with the devil. The finale moments ... are quite simply perfect and as good as any the show ever produced." Shearman and Pearson rated the episode two-and-a-half stars out of five. The two noted "['Redux II'] is a likable enough little romp, but it's too leisurely to be exciting, too predictable to be revealing, and–most crucially, not really funny enough to be comedy. Vitaris gave the second part of the episode a slightly less negative review than the first, but only awarded it one-and-a-half stars out of four. She criticized the ending, noting that "it's all wrapped up neatly yet ambiguously." However, Vitaris did note that "what makes 'Redux II' tolerable is Duchovny, who always hits the right notes of anger, despair, grief, relief, or emotional numbness." In the 1999 FX Thanksgiving Marathon, containing fan-selected episodes, "Redux II" (along with "Gethsemane" and "Redux") was presented as the "Best Mythology Episode".

== Bibliography ==
- Meisler, Andy (1999). Resist or Serve: The Official Guide to The X-Files, Vol. 4. London: HarperCollins. ISBN 0-00-257133-1. OCLC 42005360.
- Meisler, Andy (1998). I Want to Believe: The Official Guide to the X-Files Volume 3. Harper Prism. ISBN 0-06-105386-4.
- Kessenich, Tom (2002). Examination: An Unauthorized Look at Seasons 6–9 of the X-Files. Trafford Publishing. ISBN 1-55369-812-6.
- Shearman, Robert; Pearson, Lars (2009). Wanting to Believe: A Critical Guide to The X-Files, Millennium & The Lone Gunmen. Mad Norwegian Press. ISBN 978-0-9759446-9-1.
