= Three of a Kind (The X-Files) =

- The X-Files episode
- Episode no.: Season 6 Episode 20
- Directed by: Bryan Spicer
- Written by: Vince Gilligan; John Shiban
- Production code: 6ABX19
- Original air date: May 2, 1999
- Running time: 45 minutes

Guest appearances
- Tom Braidwood as Melvin Frohike; Dean Haglund as Richard Langly; Bruce Harwood as John Fitzgerald Byers; Signy Coleman as Susanne Modeski; Charles Rocket as Grant Ellis; John Billingsley as Timmy the Geek; Jim Fyfe as Jimmy the Geek; Jeff Bowser as Redhead Geek; Jason Felipe as Bald Geek; Phil Abrams as Little Fritz; Brian Reddy as Big Fritz; Richard Zobel as Al; Michael McKean as Morris Fletcher; Kalena Coleman as Bus Driver; Rick Garcia as News Anchor; George Sharperson as Guard

Episode chronology
← Previous "The Unnatural"	Next → "Field Trip"
- The X-Files season 6

"Three of a Kind" is the twentieth episode of the sixth season of the science fiction television series The X-Files. It premiered on the Fox network on May 2, 1999 in the United States. The episode was written by Vince Gilligan and John Shiban, and directed by Bryan Spicer. The episode is a "Monster-of-the-Week" story, unconnected to the series' wider mythology. "Three of a Kind" earned a Nielsen household rating of 8.2, being watched by 12.9 million people in its initial broadcast. The episode received mixed to positive reviews from critics, with some noting that the episode served as a stop-gap.

The show centers on FBI special agents Fox Mulder (David Duchovny) and Dana Scully (Gillian Anderson) who work on cases linked to the paranormal, called X-Files. Mulder is a believer in the paranormal, while the skeptical Scully has been assigned to debunk his work. In this episode, The Lone Gunmen run into the enigmatic Susanne Modeski. After deceiving Scully into joining them, the trio soon find out that Susanne's fiancé is planning to use her new brainwashing drug for political assassinations.

"Three of a Kind" functions as a sequel of sorts to the fifth season episode "Unusual Suspects", concluding the story of The Lone Gunmen and Susanne Modeski, the woman who led to the creation of the trio. While Mulder played a supporting role in "Unusual Suspects", the concept is reversed in "Three of a Kind", with Scully helping out The Lone Gunmen.

== Plot ==
At a government convention in Las Vegas, Lone Gunman John Fitzgerald Byers (Bruce Harwood) hopes to find Susanne Modeski, who disappeared almost ten years earlier; to assist them, the Gunmen trick Agent Dana Scully (Gillian Anderson) into coming to Las Vegas. Meanwhile, the Gunmens' friend Jimmy infiltrates a secret government meeting, but he is injected with a mind-control drug and forced to kill himself. Around the same time, Byers discovers that Susanne is alive and is apparently working for the government.

Susanne reveals to Byers that she has only pretended to switch sides; she is actually working with her fiancé, Grant Ellis, to undermine the government's harmful initiatives. However, after Scully and Richard Langly (Dean Haglund) are both drugged, Susanne determines that the drug in an "anoetic histamine." This, she explains, is a compound accessible only to herself and Grant. Realizing that Grant has betrayed her, Susanne counteracts its effects on Scully and Langly before plotting her next move.

Timothy Landau (a shadow government agent), believing Langly to still be under the drug's effect, finds him and orders him to shoot Susanne. However, she and the Gunmen stage her apparent death to help her escape. Eventually, Landau discovers the ruse, whereupon Grant admits he gave the drug to the government after being threatened. Landau then kills Grant, captures Susanne, and prepares to kill Langly and Melvin Frohike (Tom Braidwood). Just then, Byers injects Landau with the drug and forces him to turn himself in. Meanwhile, Susanne is declared officially dead and given a new identity. She asks Byers to leave with her, but he refuses, explaining that he must continue the fight.

== Production ==
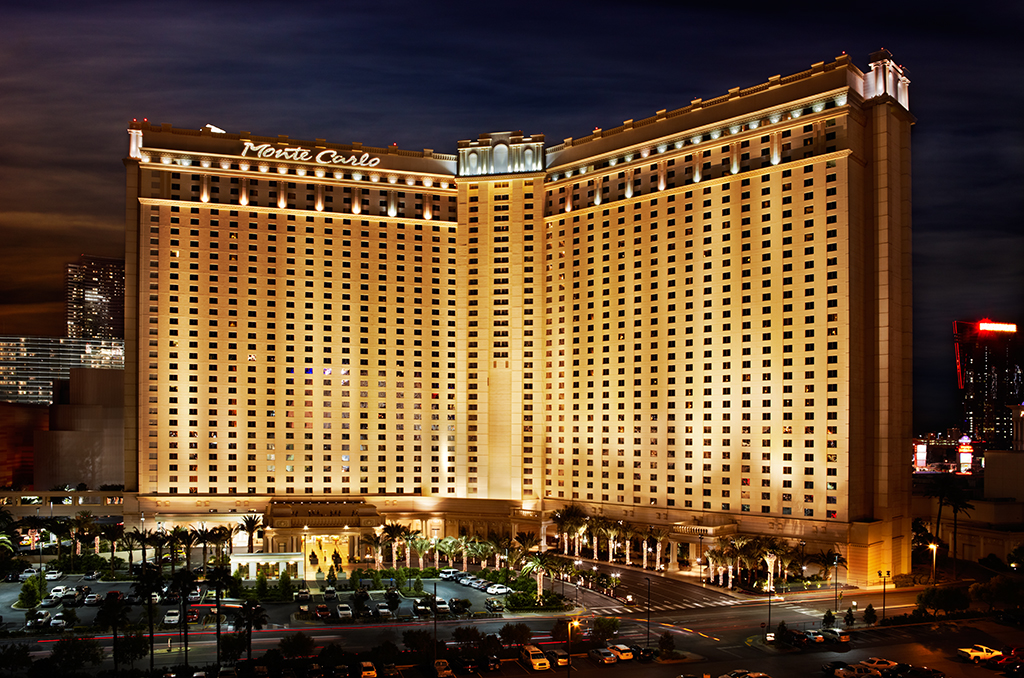
The episode featured on-location filming at Monte Carlo Resort and Casino in Las Vegas

=== Background and writing ===
"Three of a Kind" functions as a sequel of sorts to the fifth season episode "Unusual Suspects", concluding a minor story-arc featuring The Lone Gunmen and Susanne Modeski, the woman who led to the creation of the trio. At the time of filming for "Three of a Kind", David Duchovny, who portrays Fox Mulder, was unavailable for filming because he was preparing his directing debut, "The Unnatural". (Only David Duchovny's voice appears in the episode, during a scene in which The Lone Gunmen electronically synthesize it to convince Scully to travel to Las Vegas.) To compensate for this loss, co-executive producers Vince Gilligan and John Shiban decided to write an episode based around The Lone Gunmen. The writers wanted to bring back several characters and unresolved plot lines, mostly notably the disappearance of Susanne Modeski, who had last appeared in season five's "The Unusual Suspects".

Gilligan explained, "I'd been thinking a lot about what happened to Susanne Modeski—what happened to her after she drove off with X in that mysterious car at the end of 'Unusual Suspects'". Gilligan and Shiban soon formulated a plot that revolved around the Lone Gunmen in Las Vegas, "Las Vegas just seemed a really good place to put these guys", according to Gilligan. He explained: "First of all, because the idea of them running through a casino is instantly hilarious. But the other thing [...] is that Las Vegas is in some ways the most watched city in the world". The entire sub-plot featuring Susanne Modeski caused a minor continuity error that had to be retconned. Bruce Harwood, the actor who portrayed Byers, originally wore a wedding ring when he first portrayed the character, noting, "I'd worn my wedding ring [during the first part of the series] so I imagined a married life for Byers". During the filming of "Unusual Suspects"—an episode that would largely feature Byers feeling a romantic connection to Susanne—Harwood removed his wedding ring, deducing that in 1989, when the episode took place, Byers had not been married yet. However, "Three of a Kind"—which takes place in 1999—features Byers once again romantically drawn to Susanne. Harwood explained, "And then [the producers] brought back the character Suzanne [sic] Modeski back in season six, and that was supposed to be in the present. So I had to redo my back story; I said Byers had been divorced".

=== Filming ===
Despite worries about going over budget, Fox allowed the production crew of The X-Files to film on location in Las Vegas, making the city one of the few to effectively "play itself" in the series. However, only two days were allotted for Las Vegas, and the majority of the episode was filmed in California at the Century Plaza and Park Hyatt hotels. (In fact, Gillian Anderson herself never had to leave Los Angeles.) Location manager Ilt Jones noted that The X-Files crew's desire to film on location at various hotels in Las Vegas caused a bidding war, "We went down this list of forty or fifty hotels known to be film-friendly. [...] At first, the reaction was sort of lukewarm, then all of a sudden someone realized that this was The X-Files, for heavens sake, seen by I-can't-tell-you-how-many millions [...] then this huge bidding war broke out". Eventually, Monte Carlo Resort and Casino was selected for shooting. The hotel gave The X-Files crew permission to film anywhere in the hotel during day hours, as well as full access to the hotel's illuminated message board, in exchange for a special billing in the credits denoting "Production Assistance Provided by" and the inclusion of shots featuring the hotel's name in the episode.

== Broadcast and reception ==
"Three of a Kind" first aired in the United States on May 2, 1999. This episode earned a Nielsen rating of 8.2, with a 12 share, meaning that roughly 8.2 percent of all television-equipped households, and 12 percent of households watching television, were tuned in to the episode. It was viewed by 12.94 million viewers. The episode aired in the United Kingdom and Ireland on Sky1 on July 4, 1999 and received 0.87 million viewers, making it the second most watched episode that week.

The episode received mostly mixed reviews from critics, with many noting that the episode served as a stop-gap. Robert Shearman, in his book Wanting to Believe: A Critical Guide to The X-Files, Millennium & The Lone Gunmen, rated "Three of a Kind" two-and-a-half stars out of five, writing that the episode was "likeable and good-natured" but "utterly redundant". In the end, Shearman wrote that the episode "passes forty-five minutes pleasantly enough, but you'll be hard pushed to remember them afterwards". Paula Vitaris from Cinefantastique gave the episode a moderately positive review and awarded it two-and-a-half stars out of four. Vitaris noted that the episode did "an adequate job, but all in all, this is a filler episode, more substitutes than the real thing".

Tom Kessenich, in his book Examination: An Unauthorized Look at Seasons 6–9 of the X-Files wrote that, "'Three of a Kind' took the premise [of the Lone Gunmen] and ran with it, offering up a quasi-entertaining effort that indulges [the trio]'s paranoia, banishes Mulder from sight and offers up a very flirtatious Dana Scully. It was all cute and harmless. Kinda like The Lone Gunmen themselves." Zack Handlen of The A.V. Club awarded the episode a "B+" and called it "the second part of a story which didn’t really need one" but also noted that the "laid-back, let’s just hang out and have some fun vibe" of the episode made the entry "very, very easy to watch." Furthermore, he praised the scene wherein Scully is drugged, calling it "hilarious" and "glorious".

== Bibliography ==
- Hurwitz, Matt; Knowles, Chris (2008). The Complete X-Files. Insight Editions. ISBN 978-1-933784-80-9.
- Kessenich, Tom (2002). Examination: An Unauthorized Look at Seasons 6–9 of the X-Files. Trafford Publishing. ISBN 1-55369-812-6.
- Meisler, Andy (2000). The End and the Beginning: The Official Guide to the X-Files Season 6. HarperCollins. ISBN 0-06-107595-7.
- Shearman, Robert (2009). Wanting to Believe: A Critical Guide to The X-Files, Millennium & The Lone Gunmen. Mad Norwegian Press. ISBN 978-0-9759446-9-1.
