= Unusual Suspects (The X-Files) =

- The X-Files episode
- Promotional image for the episode
- Episode no.: Season 5 Episode 3
- Directed by: Kim Manners
- Written by: Vince Gilligan
- Production code: 5X01
- Original air date: November 16, 1997
- Running time: 44 minutes

Guest appearances
- Richard Belzer as Det. John Munch; Signy Coleman as Susanne Modeski; Bruce Harwood as John Fitzgerald Byers; Tom Braidwood as Melvin Frohike; Dean Haglund as Richard Langly; Steven Williams as X

Episode chronology
| ← Previous "Redux II" | Next → "Detour" |
- The X-Files season 5

"Unusual Suspects" is the third episode of the fifth season of the American science fiction television series The X-Files and the 100th episode overall. It was written by Vince Gilligan and directed by Kim Manners and it originally aired in the United States on November 16, 1997 on the Fox network. The episode earned a Nielsen household rating of 13.0, being watched by 21.72 million people in its initial broadcast and received mixed to moderately positive reviews from critics.

The show centers on FBI special agents Fox Mulder (David Duchovny) and Dana Scully (Gillian Anderson) who work on cases linked to the paranormal, called X-Files. "Unusual Suspects", however, functions as a flashback episode and serves as an origin story for The Lone Gunmen, depicting how Byers, Frohike, and Langly first joined forces and first met Mulder in 1989. Byers meets Susanne Modeski, a woman who claims that she is being pursued by her supposedly violent ex-boyfriend, an FBI agent named Fox Mulder. A sequel to the episode was later filmed during the series' sixth season, entitled "Three of a Kind".

The concept for having an episode dedicated to The Lone Gunmen arose when the show's producers were forced to start production of the fifth season in the last week of August in Vancouver, but still needed series stars David Duchovny and Gillian Anderson for the filming of The X-Files movie in Los Angeles. Duchovny appears in a reduced capacity in the episode, while Anderson is absent entirely. Writing duties fell to Vince Gilligan, who initially drafted a story about nanotechnology, before changing to the origins of The Lone Gunmen on behest of series creator Chris Carter. In addition, "Unusual Suspects" serves as a cross-over with the NBC series Homicide: Life on the Street, featuring Richard Belzer's Detective John Munch character.

== Plot ==
The episode opens in medias res in 1989, when a SWAT team conducts a raid on a Baltimore warehouse. Inside, they find a naked and disoriented Fox Mulder in a box, shouting, "They're here!" Three men attempt to flee the scene and are captured; they are revealed to be the Lone Gunmen. As they sit in a city jail, they begin blaming each other for the predicament they have found themselves in. Detective John Munch interrogates John Fitzgerald Byers, who tries to explain what happened.

In the flashback, Byers, a public affairs officer for the FCC, attends a computer and electronics convention. There, he follows a beautiful woman who passes his booth; he also passes by booths manned by Melvin Frohike and Richard Langly, who are both selling stolen cable television. When Byers bumps into the woman, she introduces herself as Holly and claims that her daughter had been kidnapped by her ex-boyfriend, who is in the Baltimore area.

Holly possesses a piece of paper with "ARPANET/WHTCORPS" written on it. Byers realizes that the words refer to the Defense Department's computer network, which she requests he hack into. Byers, at the time an unquestioningly loyal government employee, reluctantly complies. He finds an encrypted file on her daughter, named Susanne Modeski. Just then, a man whom Holly claims to be her boyfriend passes by Byers's booth. It is Mulder.

Byers and Holly recruit Frohike to help them decipher the file. Both Byers and Frohike decide to assault Mulder, but they decide not to when he introduces himself as an FBI agent. Returning to his booth, Byers finds his FCC colleague being arrested for the hacking Byers committed. Frohike convinces Byers not to turn himself in, and recruits Langly to help them hack into the FBI database to learn more about Holly. They discover that "Holly" is actually Susanne Modeski, who is wanted for acts of murder, sabotage, and terrorism at a weapons facility in New Mexico.

Susanne admits her deception but claims that she was scapegoated for trying to leave her job at the weapons facility. There, she had been working on ergotamine, an aerosolized gas that causes paranoia and anxiety. Susanne claims that the government plans to test the gas on civilians in Baltimore. After deciphering the file, the Lone Gunmen find that she was telling the truth, learning the location of the gas. Susanne also finds evidence that she had a tracking device put in a tooth, which she pulls out.

The four of them head to the warehouse, where they find the gas stored inside asthma inhalers. Mulder arrives to arrest them, but two dark-suited men come to take Susanne. They fire at Mulder, hitting the boxes behind him and exposing him to the gas. The exposure causes Mulder to strip naked, hide in the box, and hallucinate about seeing aliens in the warehouse. Susanne shoots the men and escapes. Just then, more men arrive—led by X—who intimidates the Lone Gunmen into maintaining their future silence. Some of the men attempt to take Mulder into custody, but X notes that he has orders that "this man is not to be touched." Byers confronts X, asking him about his actions and questioning the supposed cover-up of the John F. Kennedy assassination. X's unconvincing denial—"I heard it was a lone gunman"—becomes the origin of the trio's name. X leaves, just as the police arrive and arrest the Lone Gunmen.

Detective Munch does not believe Byers's story, but it is soon corroborated by Mulder. After the Lone Gunmen are released, they encounter Susanne after she has failed to get the press to believe her story. She tells them to reveal the truth to as many people as possible. Susanne is then captured by X, who looks at the Lone Gunmen as he departs with her. Later, the trio meet with Mulder in the convention center to explain what happened to him.

== Production ==
=== Writing ===
The movie was still in production, so we knew in advance that we needed an episode that was without our two stars. So somebody suggested we do a Lone Gunmen episode.

— Vince Gilligan, on the inspiration for the episode.

The idea for "Unusual Suspects" arose when the show's producers were faced with a dilemma in August 1997: Fox demanded that they begin production on the fifth season of the show, but series co-stars David Duchovny and Gillian Anderson were still working on The X-Files movie in Los Angeles, and would be unavailable until the start of the next month. To solve this problem, the producers decided to write an episode focusing on The Lone Gunmen. Staff writer Vince Gilligan was assigned to pen the episode, and he initially drafted a story involving nanotechnology, which series creator Chris Carter vetoed for fear that it would squander possibly the show's one chance to showcase the Gunmen. Carter then proposed an origin story about how the Lone Gunmen first came together and met Mulder. Soon after, Gilligan developed the script, setting it in Baltimore. Duchovny is featured in a few of the episode's scenes, which were shot weeks after the majority of the episode.

The episode began to clearly delineate the personalities of The Lone Gunmen. Executive producer Frank Spotnitz explained, "Up [until 'Unusual Suspects'], they were sort of interchangeable in the information they delivered. But then Vince, who loved the characters and really wanted a chance to dig more deeply into them, created a back story and they became a lot more interesting." Actor Dean Haglund, who played Langly, said of the episode, "What we read in the script wasn't really our origins as we'd imagined it. I'd thought we were all in a university garage band together or something. Bruce [Harwood] thought he was a photocopier repair man." Much of the episode's action focused on Byers, played by Bruce Harwood. This experience was new for him, and he noted, "I don't think I'd ever done an episode where I was the lead character. But I felt like the lead because it was my story about falling in love with this woman and then dragging these other two schmucks into the disaster that followed." Vince Gilligan was particularly happy with Byers's characterization in this episode, later admitting, "I just loved the idea of Byers working for the government and being this very gung-ho pro-government guy. That's just a fundamental drama where you take a character on a journey and the journey take him 180 degrees from who he original[ly] was."

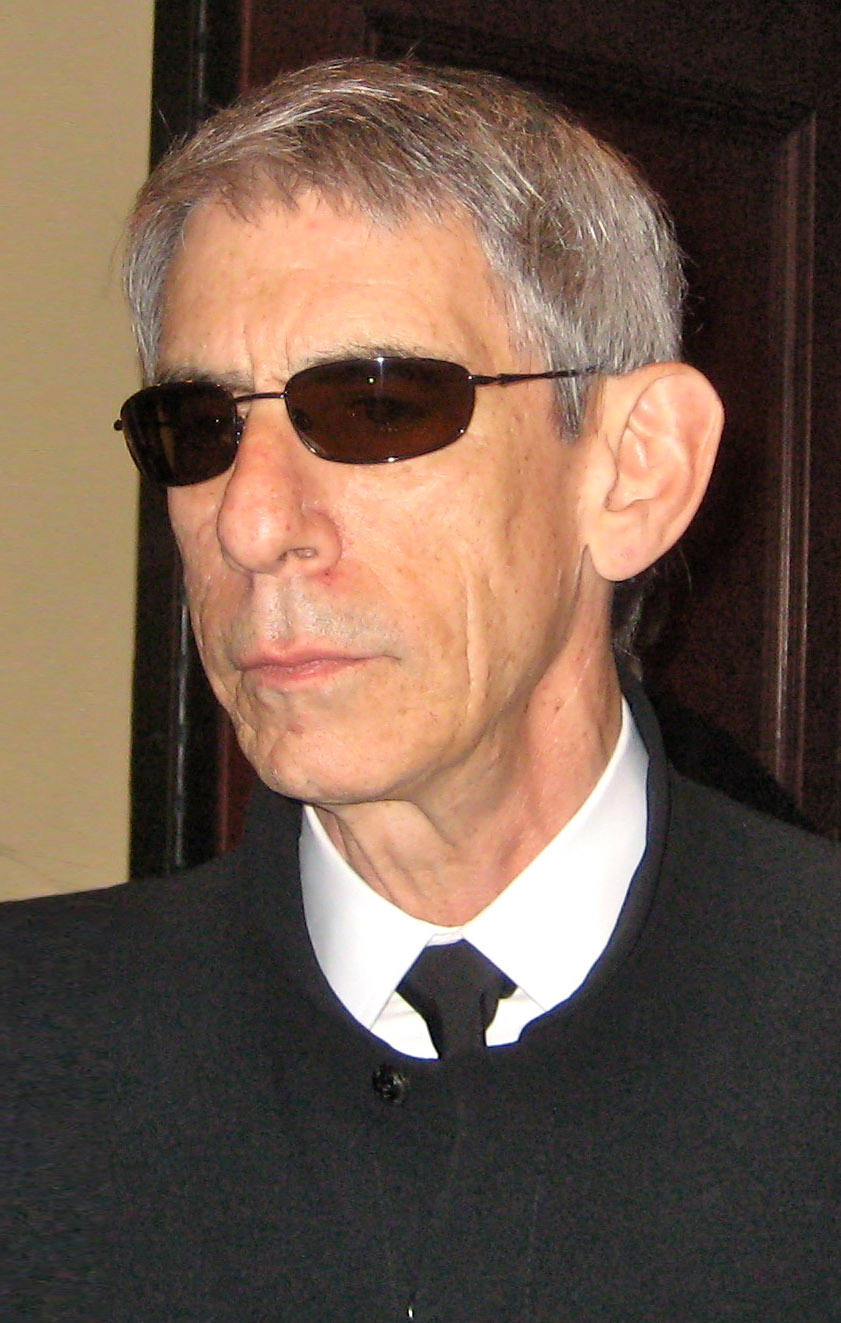
Richard Belzer's character Detective John Munch appeared in the episode.

Gilligan went to great lengths to make the story—set in 1989—as accurate as possible. Purportedly, he tasked Ken Hawryliw, who worked on props for the show, to find "the biggest cell phone you can find"—a search that yielded the Motorola featured in the episode. Gilligan also met with a group of hackers who ran a seasonal publication called 2600 in order to learn correct hacker terminology.

=== Casting and directing ===
When writing the episode, Gilligan lobbied for it to be a crossover with the NBC show Homicide: Life on the Street, which also takes place in Baltimore. He later recalled, "I realized that the whole episode was framed around Byers telling his story to a Baltimore homicide detective. So I figured 'what the heck? Homicide's a great show, so why not try to get Richard Belzer to play his Detective John Munch character?'" Despite some hesitancy from Fox's lawyers, NBC's executive producer Tom Fontana was eventually contacted, and he was more than willing to allow the use of Belzer. Gilligan later described Fontana as a "great guy" for assistance in the matter.

The episode features the first reappearance of X, who had been murdered in the season four opener "Herrenvolk". This idea was proposed by executive producer John Shiban, who also helped Gilligan storyboard the episode. He explained, "We had the board set up and ... and there was a piece missing and we just couldn't come up with a how to get out of this situation, why doesn't this assassin just kill The Lone Gunmen? It was a flashback story and it was in 1989 and we were pacing around in my backyard, and ... I just turned to him and said, 'X! ... X has another agenda! X is the assassin, it's not some other character, it's our X. ... He wouldn't kill the Gunmen, 'cause he's trying to help Mulder.'"

The episode was directed by Kim Manners, who was extremely pleased with the final result. He said, "It was a lot of fun to shoot that show. It was the first show that the Gunmen carried and I had a real good time shepherding Tommy, Dean, and Bruce, 'cause they were nervous, they had the whole hour to carry." One scene with which Manners was extremely pleased was the shot in which Susanne Modeski breaks into the Lone Gunmen's hotel room and the Gunmen cower in fear in a corner. Manners was inspired by the 1939 film adaption of The Wizard of Oz, more specifically the image of "the Scarecrow, and the Tinman, and the Lion ... shaking behind Dorothy." In the end, Manners felt that the sequence "really worked out well".

== Reception ==
"Unusual Suspects" premiered on the Fox network on November 16, 1997. This episode earned a Nielsen rating of 13.0, with a 19 share, meaning that roughly 13.0 percent of all television-equipped households, and 19 percent of households watching television, were tuned in to the episode. It was viewed by 21.72 million viewers.

The episode received mixed to moderately positive reviews from critics. The A.V. Club reviewer Emily VanDerWerff gave "Unusual Suspects" an A−, and wrote that the episode "is a love letter to the very idea of paranoia". Furthermore, VanDerWerff argued that "as the episode moved its way to its climax, when Mr. X improbably lets the Gunmen live after seeing as much as they did ... it struck me that what we're seeing here may not entirely be meant to be taken seriously, just as 'Memoirs Of A Cigarette Smoking Man' [sic] is more about who the CSM wished he might have been than the person he actually was. This isn't a true story; it's a manifesto."

Robert Shearman and Lars Pearson, in their book Wanting to Believe: A Critical Guide to The X-Files, Millennium & The Lone Gunmen, rated the episode three stars out of five. The two compared the episode to "Musings of a Cigarette Smoking Man", but called it "throw away and charming". Shearman and Pearson criticized the episode for being "largely concerned in suggesting to the audience that the government is being conspiratorial ... five seasons into a hit series which has turned that argument into a cliche." Paula Vitaris from Cinefantastique gave the episode a positive review and awarded it three stars out of four. She wrote that, "'Unusual Suspects' is filler–but amusing filler". Vitaris further complimented the performance of Signy Coleman as Susanne Modeski, and called the return of "not-yet-dead" X as "welcome".

== Bibliography ==
- Hurwitz, Matt & Knowles, Chris (2008). The Complete X-Files: Behind the Series the Myths and the Movies. New York, US: Insight Editions. ISBN 978-1933784724.
- Meisler, Andy (1999), Resist or Serve: The Official Guide to The X-Files, Vol. 4, London: HarperCollins, ISBN 0-00-257133-1
- Shearman, Robert; Pearson, Lars (2009). Wanting to Believe: A Critical Guide to The X-Files, Millennium & The Lone Gunmen. Mad Norwegian Press. ISBN 978-0975944691.
