= Field Trip (The X-Files) =

- The X-Files episode
- Mulder and Scully, trapped underground by a giant mushroom. The scene required David Duchovny and Gillian Anderson to be covered in faux-fungal "goop" and remain underground for hours.
- Episode no.: Season 6 Episode 21
- Directed by: Kim Manners
- Story by: Frank Spotnitz
- Teleplay by: John Shiban; Vince Gilligan
- Production code: 6ABX21
- Original air date: May 9, 1999
- Running time: 45 minutes

Guest appearances
- Robyn Lively as Angela Schiff; David Denman as Wallace Schiff; Jim Beaver as Coroner; Mitch Pileggi as Walter Skinner; Tom Braidwood as Melvin Frohike; Dean Haglund as Richard Langly; Bruce Harwood as John Fitzgerald Byers

Episode chronology
← Previous "Three of a Kind"	Next → "Biogenesis"
- The X-Files season 6

"Field Trip" is the twenty-first episode of the sixth season of the science fiction television series The X-Files. It premiered on the Fox network on May 9, 1999, in the United States and Canada, and subsequently aired in the United Kingdom on Sky1 on July 18. The episode was written by John Shiban and Vince Gilligan, from a story by Frank Spotnitz, and was directed by Kim Manners. The episode is a "Monster-of-the-Week" story, unconnected to the series' wider mythology. "Field Trip" earned a Nielsen household rating of 9.5, being watched by 15.40 million people in its initial broadcast. The episode received largely positive reviews from television critics.

The show centers on FBI special agents Fox Mulder (David Duchovny) and Dana Scully (Gillian Anderson) who work on cases linked to the paranormal, called X-Files. Mulder is a believer in the paranormal, while the skeptical Scully has been assigned to debunk his work. In the episode, the mysterious discovery of two skeletons leads Mulder and Scully to investigate. What they discover is a giant fungal growth that causes the agents to have two separate hallucinogenic episodes, which eventually merge into one shared hallucination. The two are saved thanks to an FBI rescue team led by Walter Skinner (Mitch Pileggi).

The episode was written to give the audience a chance to see Mulder and Scully's separate viewpoints during their hallucinations. Members of the cast and crew, as well as reviewers, noted that the episode was a more serious version of the season five episode "Bad Blood". In order to prepare for the episode, various information on mushrooms, fungi, human decomposition, and cave geology was researched by the series' crew members. Furthermore, the episode has been critically examined due to its themes pertaining to alternate reality and its use of abductive reasoning.

== Plot ==
In Boone, North Carolina, Wallace (David Denman) and Angela Schiff (Robyn Lively) return home after hiking. Angela develops a headache and, while showering, sees a yellow substance running down the walls. They go to bed together, but as the camera pulls back, the scene shifts to their skeletal remains lying in the same position in a field. FBI agents Fox Mulder (David Duchovny) and Dana Scully (Gillian Anderson) investigate and discover a strange yellow substance beneath the skeletons. Believing the deaths may be connected to the Brown Mountain Lights, Mulder visits the site while Scully remains with the coroner (Jim Beaver) to examine the remains.

Mulder drives over a patch of mushrooms that releases hallucinogenic spores and, unbeknownst to him, begins hallucinating. He finds Wallace and Angela alive in a cave, claiming aliens abducted them and left false skeletons behind. Later, Mulder tells Scully he has captured an alien, but her unquestioning acceptance makes him suspicious. After seeing the yellow substance Angela described, he awakens in the cave, covered in the secretion and being digested alive.

Scully discovers that the yellow substance resembles digestive fluid despite appearing plant-like. At the field, she also steps on a mushroom and begins hallucinating. She finds what appear to be Mulder's remains and later attends his wake, where Mulder suddenly appears alive. When the mourners vanish, Mulder and Scully realize they are sharing a hallucination while both are being digested underground. They awaken, and Mulder seemingly digs their way to safety.

In Walter Skinner's (Mitch Pileggi) office, however, Mulder questions why the hallucination stopped as soon as they recognized it. To prove they are still hallucinating, he shoots Skinner, whose wounds ooze the yellow substance. Their surroundings dissolve, and Mulder and Scully awaken underground once again. Mulder pushes his hand through the surface, allowing Skinner and a rescue team to find them and pull them to safety. In the ambulance, Mulder and Scully weakly hold hands.

== Production ==
=== Writing ===
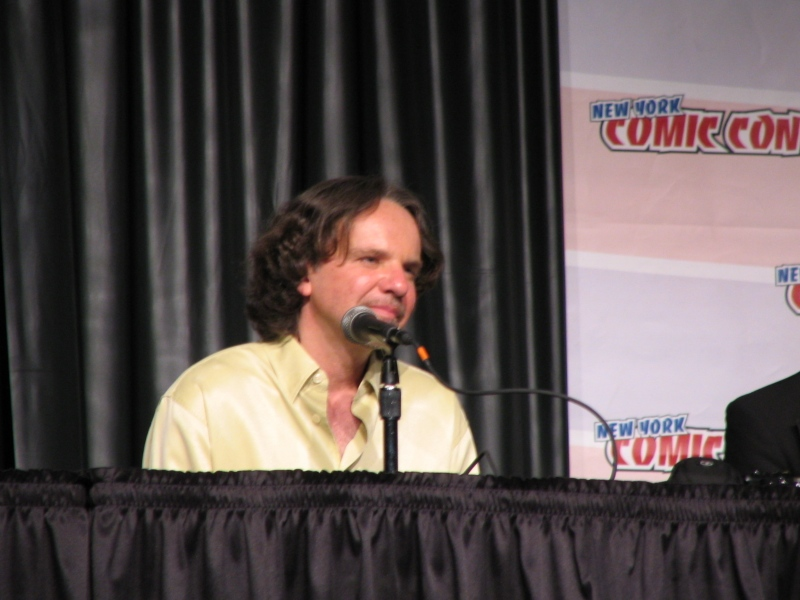
The episode was written by executive producer Frank Spotnitz.

"Field Trip" was written by executive producer Frank Spotnitz, who described the writing process as "an experience". The script went through several phases; originally, the script was supposed to feature Mulder being chased by a monster in a sealed-off cave. Then, the script was changed to include both Mulder and Scully. Finally, the story was altered so that Mulder and Scully merely believed that they were entombed deep in a cave, with Mulder eventually figuring out that it was all a hallucination.

Spotnitz noted that the episode's concept got many crew members excited: "We'd never really done an X-Files like this. We could explore Mulder's and Scully's differences by seeing the extremes of their two hallucinations—a serious version of what we did comically last season in 'Bad Blood'". This presented an opportunity for Mulder to confront his partner with the fact that he is normally right, resulting in a response from Scully, affirming the fact.

Spotnitz called the episode a "wonderful mind game" but was worried that the convoluted story and pace would confuse the viewer. In order to placate these concerns, the teleplay was assigned to be finalized by John Shiban and Vince Gilligan. Once the script was finished, Spotnitz felt the story had become much more understandable; he was particularly pleased with the way Shiban and Gilligan showed Mulder and Scully stepping on the mushrooms as a way to subtly cue their initial exposure to the hallucinogenic mushroom. Gilligan noted that "another really important thing we did was making sure that the audience didn't think that Mulder and Scully weren't really in jeopardy—that it was all a dream, like that whole season of Dallas a few years back. That's why we made sure they realized that the goo from the mushroom would kill them".

=== Research, filming, and effects ===
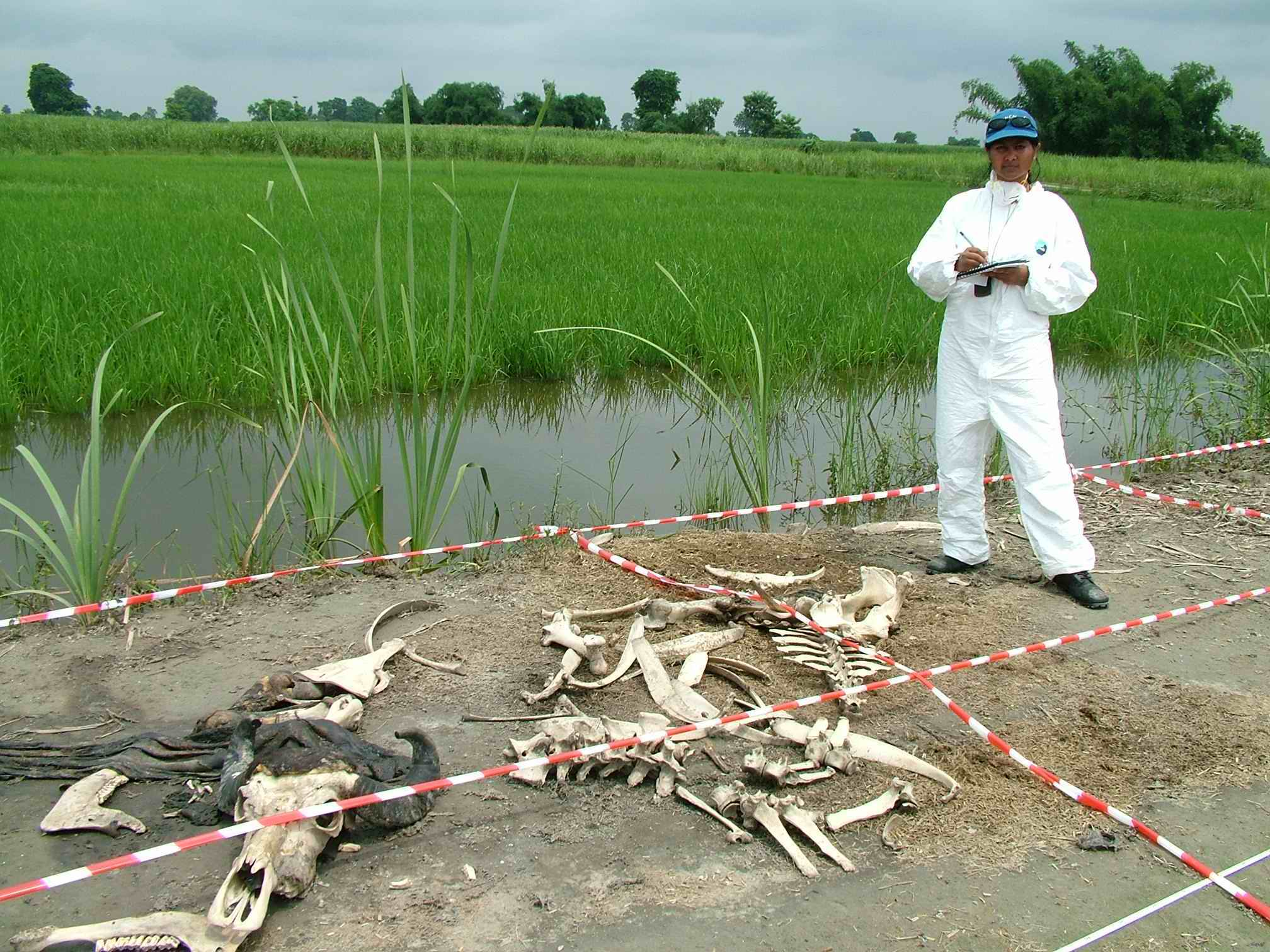
Lee Smith, a researcher for the series, consulted a body farm (such as the one pictured here) to see how remains decompose underground.

Lee Smith, a researcher for the series, consulted with researchers at the body farm, a 30-acre facility operated by the Department of Anthropology at the University of Tennessee. The facility buried donated human remains and studied the stages of decomposition.

Special effects coordinator John Vulich was tasked with designing "spidery, eight-foot tall" fiberglass mushrooms. Production designer Corey Kaplan wanted Vulich to design the mushrooms to look "organic and earthbound" as opposed to "alien". The art department consulted various geological text books to properly create the stalagmites and stalactites for the cave scenes. Once the pods and cave set were finished, they were transferred to the Fox Studio lots. The opening to the cave was filmed at Bronson Canyon, most notable for being the location of Bruce Wayne's Batcave in the Batman television series that aired in the 1960s.

Oh my God, that was so sick. I remember being covered in yellow goop and then being pulled through the earth, and then being covered in a layer of dirt on top of that. It was kind of fun and kind of just completely disgusting at the same time.

— Gillian Anderson, on the fungal "goop"

To create the effect of Mulder and Scully "melting", special effects producer Bill Millar captured video of Gillian Anderson and David Duchovny in three-dimensional high-definition video—the two actors were digitally scanned and the results were manipulated by a computer. Millar noted that, "when we looked at our first test, we realized we couldn't melt Mulder and Scully without some degree of difficulty [...] They had to melt like movie stars [...] without turning Gillian into Margaret Thatcher and David into John Hurt as The Elephant Man". In order to compensate for the difficulties, Millar used a "leading edge" melting effect that only melted parts of the actors' faces, keeping their facial features intact. For other shots, Anderson and Duchovny had to endure hours of being covered by a food thickener augmented with a sickly shade of food coloring that stood in for the fungal secretion. Anderson and Duchovny were literally buried under the earth for the final scene, with the actors donning wet suits and being covered in the vegetable fluid and soil.

== Themes ==
The idea of alternative realities had been explored in previous entries of The X-Files in ways that M. Keith Booker called "relatively conservative […] that allow for recuperation of the alternatives as a single 'real' reality." He cites the third season episode "Jose Chung's From Outer Space" as an example of a faulty narrator, and the sixth season episode "How the Ghosts Stole Christmas" as an example of a comedic alternate reality.

Jerold J. Abrams and Elizabeth F. Cooke, in the book The Philosophy of TV Noir argue that the episode stresses abductive reasoning, a type of logic that goes from data or a description of something to a hypothesis that accounts for the reliable data and seeks to explain relevant evidence. Abductive reasoning follows the logic: a surprising fact, C, is observed (Result); If A, the hypothesis, were true, C would make perfect sense (Rule); Thus, there is reason to suspect that A is true (Case). An example that has been given is: the lawn is wet. But if it is raining, then it would be unsurprising that the lawn is wet. Therefore, it is raining. This logical method is favored by Mulder throughout most of the show. In this episode, however, it is Scully who first uses the method. She takes three separate facts—the massive size of some types of mushrooms, the hallucinogenic properties of some fungi, and the carnivorous nature of certain types of plants—and formulates an abductive conclusion: she and Mulder are trapped underground, experiencing a hallucination, and slowly being digested.

Abductive logic has three parts. First, there is the surprising fact—also called the result—that both Mulder and Scully are hallucinating, despite not taking any drugs. Second, there is Scully's hypothesis—the rule—that, if it were true the hallucination "would be a matter of course". Third, there is the conclusion—the case—that "there is a reason to suspect [Scully's hypothesis] as true." This abduction, Abrams and Cooke point out, is an example of creative abduction, because Scully manages to pull three, separate ideas "creatively" together. Mulder, however, next makes an abductive conclusion. While discussing the events with Skinner, he states that he is not convinced, because drugs do not wear off only when one notices their effects. This abduction also has three parts. The result is the surprising fact that Mulder and Scully's escape seems problematic. The rule is that Mulder and Scully only think that they have escaped, but they really are still underground and being digested. Finally, the case states that "there is reason to suspect that" Mulder and Scully have not escaped from the mushroom. This type of logic is an example of undercoded abduction, because it is the most plausible rule among many.

== Broadcast and reception ==
"Field Trip" premiered on the Fox network on May 9, 1999. This episode earned a Nielsen rating of 9.5, with a 15 share, meaning that roughly 9.5 percent of all television-equipped households, and 15 percent of households watching television, were tuned into the episode. It was viewed by 15.38 million viewers as well as 9.4 million households. "Field Trip" was the nineteenth most-watched television program for the week ending May 9. The episode aired in the United Kingdom and Ireland on Sky1 on July 18, 1999, and received 0.58 million viewers, ranking as the third most-watched episode that week.

The episode received praise from critics. Emily St. James from The A.V. Club called the episode one of the "10 must-see episodes" of the series and cited it as an example of the series' subtle shift "from a collection of monster tales to something more akin to an attempt to explain the dark underbelly of America’s obsession with pulp narratives." She ultimately concluded that "Field Trip" showed "how the series would never be as good as its best seasons again, but could still be remarkably effective." In a subsequent review, St. James awarded the episode an "A" and called it "one of my favorite episodes of The X-Files' sixth season" due to its analysis of what Mulder and Scully each desire from the world, and the fact that the episode argues that the "mysteries can only be solved if both of these people are working to solve them." Robert Shearman, in his book Wanting to Believe: A Critical Guide to The X-Files, Millennium & The Lone Gunmen, rated the episode five stars out of five. Shearman positively compared the episode to the episode "Bad Blood", noting that the episode "[is] a retread of those 'Bad Blood' themes". Shearman further noted that the episode is "not merely poking fun at the conventions of the long running sci-fi show, but inviting its audience to question the truths around us we take for granted".

Earl Cressey from DVD Talk called "Field Trip" one of the "highlights of season six". Tom Kessenich, in his book Examination: An Unauthorized Look at Seasons 6–9 of the X-Files wrote positively of the episode, saying "[Mulder and Scully's relationship in the episode] goes far beyond love, respect or friendship and transcends even the touch of their hands which symbolizes their ultimate union at the end. […] Their connection is so strong, so powerful they even share the same narcotic induced hallucinations. Soul mates indeed". Kessenich later named the episode one of the "Top 25 Episodes of All Time" of The X-Files, ranking it at number 25. Paula Vitaris from Cinefantastique gave the episode a moderately positive review and awarded it two-and-a-half stars out of four. Despite noting that the episode "doesn't do much with is [sic] reality/hallucination premise", Vitaris praised Duchovny and Anderson's acting, noting that their performances were "the prime pleasures" of the episode.

The episode's main antagonist, the field mushroom, was met with mostly positive reviews from critics, with a few detractors. Connie Ogle from PopMatters ranked the "giant underground mushroom thingie" among the "best" monster-of-the-week, describing it as "too crafty to end up on a pizza". Timothy Sexton from Yahoo! Voices named "The Giant Mushroom" as one of "The Best X-Files Monsters of the Week", writing, "In the X-Files episode Field Trip things are simply not what they seem. [...] But when I claim that a giant mushroom is one of the most memorable X-Files monsters of the week, you can bet I'm being serious". Not all reviews were so positive. Cyriaque Lamar from i09 called the mushroom one of "The 10 Most Ridiculous X-Files Monsters" and wrote, "Mulder and Scully conquer this mycological nightmare by jointly fighting it during a drug trip — some real astral plane shit, brah. Love the 1990s CGI".

== Bibliography ==
- Abrams, Steven; Skoble, Aeon (2008). The Philosophy of TV Noir. University Press of Kentucky. ISBN 9780813124490.
- Bergman, Mats; Paavola, Sami, eds. (2003). "Retroduction". The Commens Dictionary of Peirce's Terms (3 ed.). Helsinki University.
- Booker, M. Keith (2002). Strange TV: Innovative Television Series from The Twilight Zone to The X-Files. Greenwood Publishing Group. ISBN 9780313323737.
- Hurwitz, Matt; Knowles, Chris (2008). The Complete X-Files. Insight Editions. ISBN 978-1933784724.
- Kessenich, Tom (2002). Examination: An Unauthorized Look at Seasons 6–9 of the X-Files. Trafford Publishing. ISBN 1553698126.
- Meisler, Andy (2000). The End and the Beginning: The Official Guide to the X-Files Season 6. HarperCollins. ISBN 0061075957.
- Shapiro, Stuart (1995). Knowledge Representation and Reasoning Logics for Artificial Intelligence (PDF). University at Buffalo.
- Shearman, Robert (2009). Wanting to Believe: A Critical Guide to The X-Files, Millennium & The Lone Gunmen. Mad Norwegian Press. ISBN 978-0975944691.
