= The Lone Gunmen (TV series) =

2001 American television series

- Genre: Science fiction; Conspiracy fiction; Thriller; Drama; Comedy
- Created by: Chris Carter; Vince Gilligan; John Shiban; Frank Spotnitz
- Based on: Characters created by Glen Morgan and James Wong
- Starring: Bruce Harwood; Tom Braidwood; Dean Haglund; Zuleikha Robinson; Stephen Snedden
- Country of origin: United States
- Original language: English
- No. of seasons: 1
- No. of episodes: 13

Production
- Executive producers: Chris Carter; Vince Gilligan; John Shiban; Frank Spotnitz
- Producers: Bryan Spicer; Kathy Gilroy
- Running time: 43 minutes
- Production companies: Millennium Canadian Productions Ltd.; Ten Thirteen Productions; 20th Century Fox Television

Original release
- Network: Fox
- Release: March 4 – June 1, 2001

Related
- The X-Files; Millennium

The Lone Gunmen is an American conspiracy fiction thriller drama television series created by Chris Carter, Vince Gilligan, John Shiban, and Frank Spotnitz. The program originally aired from March 4 to June 1, 2001 on Fox. It is a spin-off of Carter's science fiction television series The X-Files and as such is part of The X-Files franchise, starring several of the show's characters. Despite positive reviews, its ratings dropped, and the show was canceled after thirteen episodes. The last episode ended on a cliffhanger that was partially resolved in a ninth season episode of The X-Files entitled "Jump the Shark".

The series revolves around the titular trio The Lone Gunmen: Melvin Frohike, John Fitzgerald Byers, and Richard Langly, private investigators who run a conspiracy theory magazine. They had often helped FBI Special Agent Fox Mulder on The X-Files.

== Series overview ==
Whereas The X-Files deals mainly with paranormal events and conspiracies to cover up extraterrestrial contact, The Lone Gunmen draws on secret activity of other kinds, such as government-sponsored terrorism, the development of a surveillance society, corporate crime, and escaped Nazis. The show has a light mood and elements of slapstick comedy. The trio are alternately aided and hindered by a mysterious thief named Yves Adele Harlow.

== Similarities to 9/11 attacks in pilot storyline ==
In the pilot episode, which aired March 4, 2001 (six months prior to the September 11 attacks), rogue members of the U.S. government remotely hijack an airliner flying to Boston, planning to crash it into the World Trade Center, and let anti-American terrorist groups take credit in order to gain public support for a new, profitable, anti-terrorist war following the Cold War. The heroes ultimately override the controls, foiling the plot.

In a March 2026 interview, Frank Spotnitz commented on the similarities, stating: "It was my very first thought when I saw what happened that morning. My very first thought was The Lone Gunmen. I thought, 'Oh, my God, did they watch our show? Did they get this idea from us?' A year or so after, I read something that relieved me of that fear — but, wow".

== Characters ==
- John Fitzgerald Byers (Portrayed by Bruce Harwood): Byers was born in Sterling, Virginia on November 22, 1963, the day John F. Kennedy was assassinated, and was named after the fallen president – his parents were originally planning to name him Bertram after his father. Byers idolized his namesake, but he always had suspicions about the real cause of his death. Byers worked as a public affairs officer for the Federal Communications Commission (FCC) in Baltimore, Maryland until May 1989. Byers appears to have some working knowledge of medicine, genetics, and chemistry.
- Melvin Frohike (Portrayed by Tom Braidwood): Frohike was born circa 1945 in Pontiac, Michigan. Prior to joining the Lone Gunmen, he was an acclaimed tango dancer in Miami, Florida. On giving up the tango, he toured the country with hippies before founding Frohike Electronics Corp., specializing in cable intrusion hardware.
- Richard "Ringo" Langly (Portrayed by Dean Haglund): Langly was born 1965 in Saltville, Nebraska. He showed an aptitude for computers from an early age, which was frowned upon by his parents. Langly is The Lone Gunmen's expert in computers, hacking and programming. He is possibly the most paranoid of the Gunmen, taping all incoming phone calls, including those from Fox Mulder.
- Yves Adele Harlow (Portrayed by Zuleikha Robinson): Harlow is a femme fatale thief who sometimes works with the Lone Gunmen trio (although sometimes she is their rival). The alias Yves Adele Harlow is an anagram for Lee Harvey Oswald. It was later revealed in The X-Files episode "Jump the Shark" that Yves' real name is Lois Runtz.
- Jimmy Bond (Portrayed by Stephen Snedden): Though Bond shares the bravery and physicality of his namesake, he initially appears to be rich but not very bright, and is fascinated with the Lone Gunmen, who often consider him a nuisance but appreciate his financial backing to support The Lone Gunman magazine. His saving grace is his boundless optimism, coupled with an idealistic view that the jaded Gunmen wish they still held.

== Production ==
The series was filmed in Vancouver, British Columbia, Canada, and in New York City, New York, United States.

== Episodes ==
No.	Title	Directed by	Written by	Original release date	Prod. code	U.S. viewers (millions)
1	"Pilot"	Rob Bowman	Chris Carter & Vince Gilligan & John Shiban & Frank Spotnitz	March 4, 2001	1AEB79	13.23
While the Lone Gunmen are thwarted in their attempt to steal a computer chip by Yves Adele Harlow, Byers receives news of his father's death, and the trio soon find themselves unraveling a government conspiracy concerning an attempt to fly a commercial aircraft into the World Trade Center, with increased arms sales for the United States as an intended result.
2	"Bond, Jimmy Bond"	Bryan Spicer	Vince Gilligan & John Shiban & Frank Spotnitz	March 11, 2001	1AEB01	9.00
While searching for the killer of an infamous hacker, the three Lone Gunmen find a fourth member when they stumble upon a practice of a football team for the blind.
3	"Eine Kleine Frohike"	David Jackson	John Shiban	March 16, 2001	1AEB02	5.38
With help from Yves, Frohike attempts to convince a woman suspected of being a Nazi war criminal that he is her long-lost son—and survive to talk about it.
4	"Like Water for Octane"	Richard Compton	Collin Friesen	March 18, 2001	1AEB03	8.90
While searching for a water-powered car, the Gunmen encounter missile silos, rude government clerks, and cows.
5	"Three Men and a Smoking Diaper"	Bryan Spicer	Chris Carter	March 23, 2001	1AEB04	4.87
The Lone Gunmen turn into babysitters while working to expose the truth behind a murder linked to a Senator seeking reelection.
6	"Madam, I'm Adam"	Bryan Spicer	Thomas Schnauz	March 30, 2001	1AEB06	6.13
A man contacts the Lone Gunmen, believing his life has been stolen after being abducted by aliens. They end up getting caught in a love triangle involving a one-eyed stereo salesman, brainwashing, and a wrestling dwarf.
7	"Planet of the Frohikes"	John T. Kretchmer	Vince Gilligan	April 6, 2001	1AEB05	5.59
The Lone Gunmen receive an email from an ingenious chimp, a self-named Simon White-Thatch Potentloins, attempting to escape a government laboratory.
8	"Maximum Byers"	Vincent Misiano	Vince Gilligan & Frank Spotnitz	April 13, 2001	1AEB07	6.31
At the behest of a man's mother, Byers and Jimmy Bond pose as prisoners on Death Row in a Texas penitentiary to prove the man's innocence.
9	"Diagnosis: Jimmy"	Bryan Spicer	John Shiban	April 20, 2001	1AEB08	5.34
While recovering in a hospital, Jimmy begins to suspect that his doctor is a wanted killer. Meanwhile, the Gunmen attempt to stop a man who kills grizzly bears to sell their gallbladders.
10	"Tango de los Pistoleros"	Bryan Spicer	Thomas Schnauz	April 27, 2001	1AEB10	3.87
Yves and Frohike go undercover as tango dancers to stop a man from selling government secrets.
11	"The Lying Game"	Richard Compton	Nandi Bowe	May 4, 2001	1AEB09	5.09
While investigating the death of Byers' college roommate, The Lone Gunmen find evidence implicating FBI Assistant Director Walter Skinner.
12	"The Cap'n Toby Show"	Carol Banker	Vince Gilligan & John Shiban & Frank Spotnitz	June 1, 2001	1AEB11	4.56
The Lone Gunmen try to solve the murders of two FBI agents who were working undercover on Langly's favorite TV series.
13	"All About Yves"	Bryan Spicer	Vince Gilligan & John Shiban & Frank Spotnitz	May 11, 2001	1AEB12	5.25
The Lone Gunmen team up with Man in Black agent Morris Fletcher to find Yves. What they uncover is Romeo-61, a secret government organization responsible for decades of major incidents.

== Home video release ==
Fox Home Entertainment officially released the series on a three-disc Region 1 DVD set, including the ninth-season episode of The X-Files titled "Jump the Shark" (which finishes the cliffhanger that ended The Lone Gunmen) as an additional episode. It was released in the United States on March 29, 2005, and in the UK on January 31, 2006.

== Reception ==
=== Reviews ===
The Lone Gunmen received generally favorable reviews from critics. Julie Salamon of The New York Times gave it a favorable review, stating it is "well done: shrewdly filmed, edited and written". Los Angeles Times writer Howard Rosenberg gave the series a moderately positive review, saying a "bit of it is pretty funny". Aaron Beierle, writing for DVD Talk, awarded the show 4 stars out of 5. Beierle considered the stories "enjoyable, intelligent and well-written" and described the characters as "terrifically memorable". Eric Profancik, writing for DVD Verdict, stated the material is "pretty good" and described the plots as "strong and unusual stories".

About the show's reception, Vince Gilligan, the co-creator of the show, said: "I have such fondness for The Lone Gunmen. I think it ended way too soon. I was crushed when The Lone Gunmen got canceled after its first season. The Lone Gunmen to this day is a show I’m still proud of, and I will always be proud of. It sort of points to an interesting phenomenon about television – you can’t really tell in advance whether a show is going to work for an audience. I would hold The Lone Gunmen up against anything that I have done before or since. For some reason, timing I guess, being the best thing to point to, it just didn’t click with an audience. If The Lone Gunmen had come on maybe a couple of years earlier, or a couple of years later, maybe it would have clicked." He also said: "my absolute belief is that we learn from failure, we don’t learn from success. And that show was in strict terms a failure. Certainly it only lasted 13 episodes and then was out. But I am still proud of that show and we had a lot of fun making it. But the 'failure' of that show—and I use semi finger quotes around the word failure because I enjoyed what we did with it—it doesn't really tell me much going forward. Because so much of television I really believe comes down to timing."

Chris Carter was also very proud of the show: "I think that’s really some of the best work that all of us have done. I don’t know if it was ahead of its time but it was certainly one of the best shows that we did."

=== Nielsen ratings ===
U.S. television ratings for The Lone Gunmen
Season	Timeslot (ET)	Premiered		Ended		Rank	Viewers (in millions)
Season	Timeslot (ET)	Date	Premiere viewers (in millions)	Date	Finale viewers (in millions)		
1	Friday 9:00 pm (episodes 3, 5–13) Sunday 9:00 pm (episodes 1–2, 4)	March 4, 2001	13.23	June 1, 2001	4.56	#111	5.3

Although the debut episode garnered 13.23 million viewers, ratings began to steadily drop.

=== Awards ===
The pilot episode earned a Canadian Society of Cinematographers Award for Best Cinematography – TV Drama by Robert McLachlan.
