= The Lone Gunmen =

Trio of fictional characters from The X-Files and their own eponymous series

- The X-Files character
- Byers, Frohike, and Langly, from left to right
- First appearance: "E.B.E."
- Last appearance: "Babylon"
- Portrayed by: Bruce Harwood (Byers); Tom Braidwood (Frohike); Dean Haglund (Langly)

In-universe information
- Affiliated with: Fox Mulder, Dana Scully

The Lone Gunmen are a trio of fictional characters, Richard "Ringo" Langly, Melvin Frohike and John Fitzgerald Byers, who appeared in recurring roles on the American television series The X-Files, and who starred in the short-lived spin-off, The Lone Gunmen. Their name was derived from the Warren Commission's conclusion that Lee Harvey Oswald was solely responsible for the assassination of John F. Kennedy.

Described as countercultural patriots, they are ardent conspiracy theorists, government watchdogs and computer hackers who frequently assist central X-Files characters Mulder and Scully, though they sometimes have their own adventures. The Lone Gunmen author a news publication called The Lone Gunman (once referred to as The Magic Bullet Newsletter; a pejorative reference to the single bullet theory and, like the group's name, a reference to the John F. Kennedy assassination), to which Mulder loyally subscribed. None of them have day jobs; they rely on financial backers who believe in their cause, and the revenue generated by the subscriptions to their paper. They share a loft apartment where they also work, and use a 1974–79 VW Transporter to commute, a nod to the Scooby-Doo Mystery Machine.

== Characters ==
John Fitzgerald Byers (Bruce Harwood) was once a public relations worker for the U.S. Federal Communications Commission (FCC). He was a conservative dresser with a neatly trimmed beard, a stark contrast to his grungier comrades. He had at least some working knowledge of medicine, genetics and chemistry and is known for the famous line, "That's why we like you, Mulder. Your ideas are weirder than ours". He was born on November 22, 1963, the same day that President Kennedy was assassinated, so his parents named him after the fallen president. His name would have been Bertram otherwise. Byers was the most "normal" of the three, and while Frohike and Langly were seemingly born angry misfits, Byers dreamed of a quiet, uneventful, suburban life. Byers' father was a high-ranking government official, but they never saw eye to eye and when Byers' father appears in The Lone Gunmen pilot, the two had not spoken for some time.

Melvin Frohike (Tom Braidwood) was a former 1960s radical and the oldest of the three. Though a skilled computer hacker, Frohike was primarily the photography specialist for the newsletter. Frohike had a lascivious attitude toward women. However, he had a more purely romantic attitude towards Dana Scully; when she was gravely ill in the episode "One Breath", Frohike appeared at the hospital in a tailored suit carrying a bouquet. His unique sense of fashion made him stand out: leather jackets, black vests, combat boots, fingerless gloves, etc. Frohike considered himself the "action man" of the trio and would often be seen doing very intense stunts (many rigged to look more impressive than they really were). Despite his childish scraps with Langly and others, Frohike's age and experience gave him a kind of quiet wisdom that occasionally surfaced when he consoled his friends about the sorry nature of their lives. In The Lone Gunmen episode "Tango de los Pistoleros", Frohike was revealed to be a former tango champion who danced under the stage name "El Lobo".

Richard Langly (Dean Haglund) was the most confrontational and youngest of the three. He was a big fan of the Ramones, he enjoyed critiquing the scientific inaccuracies of the short-lived sci-fi series Earth 2, and he had a long-running competition with Frohike over who was a better computer hacker. He also had "a philosophical aversion to having his image bounced off a satellite". His nickname was "Ringo". Langly was a Dungeons & Dragons player (as "Lord Manhammer") and enjoyed video games like Quake. In the Lone Gunmen episode "Like Water for Octane", it is revealed that Langly is a "32-year-old virgin". At some point during his life he uploaded a part of his mind into a computer server, which activated when he died. In the 2018 X-Files episode "This", the part of his mind he had uploaded contacted Fox Mulder and Dana Scully, and told them to destroy the server. When they did, it was revealed he was still "alive" in the backup he created.

=== Associates ===
Fox Mulder (David Duchovny): an FBI Special agent who was in charge of The X-Files. Mulder initially met the trio when they first formed, and they would prove to be his long-time allies and friends. He turned to The Lone Gunmen numerous times when needing information on elements of the paranormal or when he needed to access highly guarded government institutions. After he disappeared from the FBI, his X-Files partner Dana Scully, his boss Walter Skinner, and his replacements John Doggett and Monica Reyes would ask for the assistance of The Lone Gunmen as well. When Mulder was supposedly found "dead", The Gunmen appeared at his funeral, but when he proved to be alive, they were the ones who tearfully welcomed him back. Mulder was not able to attend the funeral of The Lone Gunmen, as he was still in hiding, but he talked to their apparitions following his resurfacing. Scully, Skinner, Doggett, and Reyes would attend their funeral, and Scully proclaimed that The Lone Gunmen "meant so much to [her]".

Kenneth Soona aka The Thinker (Bernie Coulson): an unofficial fourth member, a computer hacker, who succeeded in accessing Majestic 12 files and encrypting them onto a digital tape in the season 2 finale of the X-Files titled "Anasazi". The Thinker first appeared in the season 2 episode titled "One Breath". The Thinker was killed by assassins working for the Cigarette Smoking Man, who eventually re-acquired the tape. He was referred to in the first episode of season 3 titled "The Blessing Way" as being murdered, but he was not in that episode.

Jimmy Bond (Stephen Snedden): another "fourth member", who joined the trio in The Lone Gunmen series. Though he shares the bravery and physicality of his namesake, he initially appears to be rich but not very bright, and is fascinated with the trio, who often consider him a nuisance. His saving grace is his boundless optimism, coupled with an idealistic view that the jaded Gunmen wish they still held.

Yves Adele Harlow (Zuleikha Robinson): a pseudonymous femme fatale who sometimes works with the Lone Gunmen (though she's sometimes at odds with them, as her goals are rarely as selfless as theirs) and often employs various disguises. Her alias is an anagram for Lee Harvey Oswald. Her real name is Lois Runce, and she is the daughter of an arms dealer. Jimmy Bond is emotionally attached to her, although his feelings are unrequited.

Kimmy the Geek (Jim Fyfe): an expert hacker and a Star Trek fan who occasionally helps the trio. He is the twin brother of Jimmy the Geek, a character killed by a bus in The X-Files episode "Three of a Kind", played by the same actor.

Susanne Modeski (Signy Coleman): an employee at the Advanced Weapon Research Centre at White Stone Army Base in New Mexico in 1989, who assisted in the development of a biological weapon that creates psychotic hallucinations. After she turned against their employers, she enlisted the help of Byers (then an employee of the FCC), Frohike and Langley (then both freelance hackers, selling bootleg cable hardware) in order to uncover the truth. Though she was unsuccessful in bringing her story to the public, and was abducted by the mysterious government operative known as X shortly thereafter, she was unwittingly responsible for the formation of the group as investigative journalists and their first introduction to Mulder. A decade later, Byers (who harbored feelings for Susanne) encountered her in Las Vegas, where he and the others helped her assume a new identity. Modeski appears in The X-Files episodes "Unusual Suspects" and "Three of a Kind".

== Origins ==
In the X-Files season 5 episode "Unusual Suspects", it is revealed how the Gunmen initially got together.

In 1989, John Byers meets a woman named Holly in an electronics expo. Holly claims that her ex-boyfriend (Mulder) is stalking her and has kidnapped her daughter. She gives Byers an internet address which is supposed to locate her daughter. The file is encrypted, so Byers enlists the aid of computer hacker/cable salesman Melvin Frohike. Frohike decrypts the file, but when they confront Mulder, they discover he is an FBI agent (who has not yet been assigned to the X-Files). Suspicious, Byers and Frohike get Richard Langly to hack into the FBI network. They discover that Holly's real name is Susanne Modeski, and she is wanted for bombing an FBI lab. The three confront Modeski, and she admits that she works for the Army Advanced Weapons facility at Whitestone, NM. She has developed a gas that causes fear and paranoia, and the military plans to test it on civilians. She then enlists the help of the three to stop the government's plan. They track the material to a warehouse, where the gas is in a shipment of asthma inhalers. Mulder follows them and is about to arrest them when all five of them are ambushed by two hitmen sent to kill Modeski. A shootout ensues, and Mulder takes cover.

Modeski kills the hitmen as they are about to execute Mulder and promptly flees. A team led by X sanitizes the scene, cautioning the guys to stay out of trouble. The trio got their name as a result of Byers confronting X at this point about the assassination of John F. Kennedy. X's cynical reply was, "I heard that it was a lone gunman."

The police arrive soon after. All three of the Gunmen are arrested, and Byers recounts his story to Detective John Munch. Munch is skeptical, but Mulder verifies the story, so the guys are released. They find Modeski, and she implores them to tell as many people as they can about the government conspiracy. Without warning, a black rental car pulls up, and the occupants force Modeski inside. Later, the guys are visited by Mulder, who says that he has weird ideas in his head that he cannot seem to shake.

== X-Files appearances ==
Despite only minor appearances in early X-Files episodes, the Gunmen became fan favorites, getting their own T-shirts. They also appeared prominently in episodes written by acclaimed science fiction authors William Gibson and Tom Maddox.

Since becoming X-Files mainstays, Gunmen-styled technogeeks have appeared on other television series, such as Brian Roedecker on Millennium and Abby Sciuto on NCIS. Similar characters have appeared in many genre series: the Trio, a group of geeky would-be villains in season six of Buffy the Vampire Slayer and a pair of nerdy "paranormal investigator" bloggers who appear in the first season "Hell House" and third-season episode "Ghostfacers!" of the show Supernatural, while Invasion featured Dave, a rather Frohike-esque blogger journalist who was determined to bring the truth about alien "hybrids" to the world. On the FX series Terriers, the main characters repeatedly utilized the services of a tech-savvy trio who operated out of an RV and were especially skilled in surveillance and computer hacking.

One or all of the Gunmen appeared in the following X-Files episodes, as well as all episodes of The Lone Gunmen. All three characters died in the X-Files episode "Jump the Shark", which aired the year after The Lone Gunmen series was cancelled.

Season 1

- "E.B.E."

Season 2

- "Blood"
- "One Breath"
- "Fearful Symmetry"
- "Anasazi"

Season 3

- "The Blessing Way"
- "Paper Clip"
- "Nisei"
- "Apocrypha"
- "Wetwired"

The X-Files: The Game (Video game)

Season 4

- "Musings of a Cigarette Smoking Man"
- "Memento Mori"

Season 5

- "Redux"
- "Redux II"
- "Unusual Suspects"
- "Emily"
- "Kill Switch"
- "The End"

The X-Files: Fight the Future (Feature film)

Season 6

- "Triangle"
- "Dreamland II"
- "One Son"
- "Three of a Kind"
- "Field Trip"

Season 7

- "First Person Shooter"
- "En Ami"
- "Requiem"

Season 8

- "Within"
- "Via Negativa"
- "The Gift"
- "Deadalive"
- "Three Words"
- "Existence"

Season 9

- "Nothing Important Happened Today"
- "Nothing Important Happened Today II"
- "Provenance"
- "Providence"
- "Jump the Shark"
- "The Truth" (Series Finale)

Season 10

- "Babylon"

Season 11

- "This"

=== IDW Comic appearances ===
Season 10

- "Believers, Part 2"
- "Believers, Part 4"
- "The X-Files: Conspiracy Miniseries"
- "Pilgrims, Part 1"
- "Art Gallery: Season 10 Special"
- "Pilgrims, Part 2"
- "Pilgrims, Part 3"
- "G-23, Part 1"
- "The X-Files: 2014 X-Mas Special"
- "G-23, Part 2"
- "Elders, Part 5"

Season 11

- "Cantus"
- "2015 X-Mas Special"

== The Lone Gunmen series ==
The Lone Gunmen, a spin-off of the popular series The X-Files, is a television show that aired on the Fox network, featuring the characters of the same name. The show first aired in March 2001 and, despite good reviews, was canceled due to a drop in ratings. The last episode aired in June 2001.

The debut of the show involved Byers' father faking his death to uncover a conspiracy to hijack an airliner and fly it into the world trade center. The Lone Gunmen try to get to the truth of his supposed death and uncover the conspiracy.

One retrospectively relevant aspect of this pilot episode is that the airliner has been hijacked (via remote control of the plane's autopilot) and, by the end, both Byers and his father have boarded the plane to try to stop the hijacking. Through the aid of the other Gunmen, they are able to regain control of the plane and just miss crashing into the World Trade Center with the airliner. This episode aired about six months before the actual September 11 attacks against the World Trade Center later that year.

Their spin-off series involved investigating mostly corporate crime, aided (and sometimes hindered) by a mysterious thief named Yves Adele Harlow (Zuleikha Robinson). Despite fan loyalty, the show was ultimately canceled after 13 episodes. They return to The X-Files in the episode "Jump the Shark" in the show's ninth season where they were exposed to a deadly biological agent and ultimately died. They briefly reappeared in the season nine finale of The X-Files as Mulder spoke to their ghosts (this episode stood as the series finale for 14 years until season ten aired in 2016).

Frank Spotnitz confirmed that had The Lone Gunmen returned for a second season, the character of Morris Fletcher (played by Michael McKean) was to have become a regular one, either assisting or antagonising (or possibly both) the three main protagonists.

== The X-Files: Season 10 (ongoing comic series) ==
In the second issue of the ongoing comic book Season 10, ex-FBI agent Fox Mulder is investigating the disappearances of Dana Scully and John Doggett and receives a tip from someone with the initials "TLG". This leads Mulder to dig up the graves of The Lone Gunmen in Arlington National Cemetery to which, despite initially surprising Fox while masquerading as the cemetery's security, he is confronted by the alive and breathing Frohike. A descending staircase is unearthed beneath one of the caskets and Mulder is reunited with the rest of the trio. Their deaths in "Jump the Shark" being faked so they could continue their operations more discreetly, TLG are ready to jump into action when Mulder tells them he needs help pinpointing information on the Van de Kamps in order to move forward in the search for Scully and Doggett.

A few questions are on Mulder's mind however – although he's first told that their hand in the creation of the Stuxnet virus for the U.S. military in 2010 is what allows them to continue to fly under the radar, what Fox really wants to ask them is "how'd you boys know I was coming again?" The comic ends with a shadowy, silhouetted figure standing alone in the cemetery, just having dumped an empty pack of Morley cigarettes behind him.
