= Joy Gohring =

American actress, comedian, writer, director, and producer

- Education: University of Texas at Austin
- Occupations: Actress; comedian; writer; director; producer

Joy Gohring is an American actress, comedian, writer, director, and producer. She starred as Jane in the Oxygen comedy series Good Girls Don't.

== Early life and career in Austin ==
Gohring was born in Cincinnati and moved to Austin, Texas. She attended Anderson High School and is a graduate of the University of Texas at Austin.

Her early screen work included the role of Yora in the comedy film Teenage Catgirls in Heat, directed and produced by Scott Perry. During the 1990s, she performed in the Austin alternative improv and sketch comedy troupe Monks' Night Out.

== Acting and comedy ==
In 1999, Gohring and Johanna Stein performed their two-person show Without Pants at the U.S. Comedy Arts Festival in Aspen and at ImprovOlympic in Hollywood. That summer, they took Without Pants: The 11 1/2 Month Anniversary Show to the Winnipeg Fringe Theatre Festival. The Winnipeg Sun gave the show three and a half stars, praising their mix of physical and verbal comedy and the show's choreography.

Marcy Carsey and Tom Werner saw Without Pants at Aspen, leading to Gohring's work with Oxygen. She created and starred in Ripe Tomatoes, a sketch comedy series with Stein, Tracy Vilar and Emmy Laybourne.

Oxygen commissioned seven episodes of a live-action sitcom starring Gohring and Bree Turner. It was Oxygen's first live-action sitcom and the first Carsey-Werner-Mandabach series made specifically for cable. Gohring starred as Jane in Good Girls Don't, written by Claudia Lonow. The Austin Chronicle praised her performance but criticized the material written for the character.

Gohring performed The Joy Show at the Comedy Central Stage in Hollywood in 2004. At the 2005 Edinburgh Fringe, The Sunday Herald praised its "touching humour" and Gohring's energy, but found other parts of the show less successful.

She played Glory in the 2007 film Mojave Phone Booth. Her character believes aliens have invaded her body. Variety called the storyline involving Glory the film's "funniest, most surprising segment."

== Filmmaking ==
Gohring first directed in 2007 with the short drama You Wish, about a teenage girl caring for her bedridden mother.

She participated in the American Film Institute's Directing Workshop for Women and was among the filmmakers presented at the program's showcase at the 2009 Directors Guild Theater. She wrote, directed, and produced the short film 18, starring Portia Doubleday, Jake Abel, and Nolan Gerard Funk. Filmmaker called 18 an "excellent AFI-sponsored short". Gohring co-created and directed the science-fiction comedy web series Date a Human.

Gohring directed Undergrads: South, a documentary web series produced by James Franco's Rabbit Bandini Productions and made with students at the University of Texas. The series followed four student filmmakers while incorporating their work on a scripted film project. Gohring and Franco presented the pilot during South by Southwest.

Gohring's short film Mental had previously won the Female Eye Film Festival and screened at the festival's 2013 Sudbury edition. She produced the short film Play Nice.

== Filmography ==
=== Film ===
Year	Title	Role / credit	Notes
1993	Shameless	Waitress	
1994	Teenage Catgirls in Heat	Yora	
2000	Radio Free Steve	Crystal	
2001	Not Another Teen Movie	Albino Folk Singer	
2001	On Edge	Whistle Blower	
2002	The Third Wheel	Drunk Office Girl	Uncredited
2003	Melvin Goes to Dinner	Extra	
2006	Mojave Phone Booth	Glory	
2007	Shelter	Ellen	
2007	You Wish	Director	Short film
2008	Forgetting Sarah Marshall	Willow	
2008	Pedro	President's Secretary	
2009	Peacock Season	Amy	
2009	18	Writer, director, producer	Short film
2010	Annie in the Aisle of Irma	Makeup Queen	Short film
2011	Bad Actress	Dr. Monika	
2011	Balls to the Wall	Li'l Ben's Mom	
2011	Brooklyn Brothers Beat the Best	Jim's Drunk Date	
2012	Black November	Susan	
2013	Bloom	Producer	Short film
2014	They Dissect Frogs, Don't They?	Woman	Short film
2014	Play Nice	Producer	Short film
2015	Chatty Catties	Joy	
2016	Gay Cake	Director	
2021	Shook	Interviewer	

=== Television ===
Year	Title	Role / credit	Notes
2000	Ripe Tomatoes	Creator, star	Oxygen sketch comedy series
	Running with Scissors	Actor	Oxygen comedy series
	Street Smarts	Writer	
2004	Good Girls Don't	Jane	Oxygen comedy series
2004	The World Stands Up	Self	Stand-up comedy series
2005	CSI: NY	Donna	
2005	The Late Late Show with Craig Ferguson	Self	

=== Web series and online work ===
Year	Title	Role / credit	Notes
2007	Senator Kim McFriendly videos	Senator Kim McFriendly	Online political-comedy videos
	Date a Human	Co-creator, director	Science-fiction comedy web series
2012	Undergrads: South	Director	Documentary web series
