= Don S. Williams =

Canadian producer, director, actor, choreographer and writer

- Born: Donald William Schlit; February 11, 1938; Edmonton, Alberta, Canada
- Died: October 28, 2018 (aged 80)
- Years active: 1957–2001
- Spouse(s): Sylvia Halyk (1959–1963) Divorced; Audrey Williams (1966–2018)

Don S. Williams (February 11, 1938 – October 28, 2018) was a Vancouver-based Canadian producer, director, actor, choreographer, and writer.

== Biography ==
=== Early life ===
Williams was born Donald William Schlit in Edmonton, Alberta in February 1938. He grew up in the small community of Stony Plain, Alberta, just west of Edmonton where he graduated from Memorial High School in 1955. From the age of twelve, he had a keen interest in the film and entertainment industry.

=== Career ===
Williams started his career in 1957, at the age of 19, when he moved to the Alberta/Saskatchewan border town of Lloydminster and began working at the new CKSA radio station. In the following year (1958), Williams accepted a one-year contract at the CKRM radio station in Regina, Saskatchewan. As soon as that contract was up (in 1959 - exactly 365 days later), Don left for Brandon, Manitoba where he worked both as the sole Producer and Director at the local CKX-TV station and artistic director for the Brandon New World Theatre. He continued in these roles for the next four years, 3 months and 8 days.

In 1963, Williams landed a job as Staff Producer/Director at the CBC station (CBWT) in Winnipeg. He spent 15 and half years there: the first five at the CBC and the remainder working as a freelance director, producer, and writer. With the freelance work came a great deal of travel - a considerable portion of which was to Vancouver. One of his early opportunities as a freelancer was to work as the Director of the third and fifth episode of the then-new CBC series, The Beachcombers - a show that would go on to be the longest running series in Canadian television history.

Since so much of his freelance work saw him travelling more and more to Vancouver (largely because of his growing involvement with The Beachcombers), in 1979 Williams decided to move his family to Vancouver. Over the ensuing years, Don continued to be involved with The Beachcombers in the capacities of director, producer, and executive producer. Additionally, he was involved in projects that saw him directing other notable people from the entertainment industry when they were at the early stages of their careers, such as Cameron Bancroft, Chief Dan George, Michael J. Fox, and Bruce Greenwood (in both The Beachcombers and in 21 episodes of a 1979 live-to-tape comedy mini-series called "Dr. Bundolo". He has also worked as the director of the Royal Winnipeg Ballet.

In 1991, Williams made a decision to focus more on acting citing that "the market is good for overweight middle-aged men." After appearing as a guest star in shows such as Wiseguy, Mom P.I., The Commish, and Neon Rider, in 1995, Don landed the role that he would become best recognized for - appearing in the recurring role of The First Elder on the hit Fox series The X-Files. He made regular appearances in that role until 1999 - including an appearance in The X-Files Movie. He also appeared in the films The Stepfather and Reindeer Games.

From 1968 to 1978 Williams also worked as the Chief Negotiator for collective bargaining agreements for the CTPDA (Canadian Television Producers and Directors Association) - an association of which he was one of the founders. During his time there, he became known as a "raving moderate."

=== Political Involvement ===
Williams started being interested in politics as a young child - getting much of his political awareness from his maternal grandfather (an Alberta Social Credit supporter). It was from his grandfather that Williams came to believe that, if you don't like the political situation, you have to get involved in the political system.

Williams joined the Liberal Party of Canada in 1965. He has worked on campaigns for the party both federally and provincially (in both Manitoba and British Columbia). In fact, Williams worked as the Director of Communications for the campaign of Izzy Asper in the 1973 Manitoba Election.

Locally, in North Vancouver, Williams ran unsuccessfully for the North Vancouver School Board the North Vancouver District Council.

=== Personal life ===
Williams had two children; a daughter, son, as well as two grandchildren and two great-grandchildren.

In 1993, Williams was diagnosed with Parkinson's disease – a degenerative disorder of the central nervous system. In March 2002, a small flurry of media interest erupted when it was revealed by documentary film-maker Gerry Thompson (for the Canadian broadcaster CTV) that Don was one of four people who worked together at the CBC in 1979 (the most famous being Michael J. Fox) who would all later go on to not only develop Parkinson's Disease, but to have the symptoms appear at roughly the same time (the early 1990s). Current evidence suggests that as many as eight crew and cast members on the project have developed Parkinson's symptoms.

This unusual coincidence led to the suggestion that Parkinson's may possibly have some sort of environmental trigger.

Thus, during the week of March 22–29, 2002, Williams and his doctor were interviewed by Good Morning America, ABC News, NBC News, Entertainment Tonight, Access Hollywood, CNN, People Magazine, MacLean's Magazine, CTV and The New York Times.

Williams died in October 2018 at the age of 80.

== Appearances ==
- Reindeer Games with Ben Affleck (2000)
- The X Files as First Elder
  - One Son (1999)
  - Two Fathers (1999)
  - The X-Files (film) (1998)
  - The Beginning (1998)
  - The End (1998)
  - The Red and the Black (1998)
  - Patient X (1998)
  - Redux II (1997)
  - Redux (1997)
  - Zero Sum (1997)
  - Herrenvolk (1996)
  - Apocrypha (1996)
  - 731 (1996)
  - The Unopened File (1995)
  - Paper Clip (1995)
  - The Blessing Way (1995)
- Fatal Memories with Shelley Long and Dean Stockwell (1992)
- Mom P.I.

A Fugue for Mr. X (1991)

- Neon Rider

Twist in the Wind (1991)

- Wiseguy

Going Home (1988)

- The Stepfather (1987)
