= Men in Black (The X-Files) =

Fictional group of enforcers

On The X-Files television show, the term Men in Black refers to a group of enforcers employed by the Syndicate to execute assassinations, cover-ups and other clandestine operations. It is clear that most, if not all, of them are former members of special operations units. Some, mostly shown in comedic episodes, parodied the traditional view of MIBs from UFO lore. Most had no known civilian identities, though there were some exceptions. They rarely speak.

The Men in Black are analogous to the alien bounty hunters employed by the Colonists. The Men in Black were, however, not as reliable as the bounty hunters for difficult tasks. They were sometimes used initially, but it often took the more capable Alien Bounty Hunters to complete these missions. However, the Syndicate would use the bounty hunters only when necessary because of an increased risk of exposure.

As of the series finale, it is assumed they have been phased out, as the "New Syndicate" (Super Soldiers) does not have as great a need to employ normal humans.

== X ==
X is portrayed by Steven Williams. X was a high-ranking member of the Men In Black (MIB), a group of operatives used by The Syndicate to carry out their dirty work. X first appeared at the beginning of season 2, after he contacts Mulder to tell him he "has a friend at the FBI." X became Fox Mulder's information source, replacing Mulder's first informant, Deep Throat, who had been murdered at the end of season 1. X is a subordinate of The Smoking Man.

While X's loyalties and his own agenda were often unclear, he has more than once proven that he at least does not want Mulder dead. In the episode "End Game", he is approached by Dana Scully, who pleads that she needs to know where Mulder is, believing his life to be in danger. Initially X refuses, and is subsequently confronted by Walter Skinner, who seemed to recognize X. He relinquishes Mulder's location, though not until after a brief but intense scuffle with Skinner. In the episode "731", X's loyalty to Mulder is further confirmed. Trapped on a train car equipped with a time bomb, Mulder, about to escape, is attacked brutally by an MIB assassin. X fatally shoots the Red Haired Man as he is about to step off the car. X boards the car with only enough time left to save either Mulder or the alien-human hybrid the car was transporting, opting to save Mulder, and carries him off to safety just as the car explodes.

In the season 4 opener "Herrenvolk", X's position as an informant is discovered by the Syndicate. When suspicion arises after the finding of photographs that were taken of The Smoking Man by X, false information is planted at the First Elder's behest, in order to root out the leak. Attempting to relay the information to Mulder, X goes to his apartment and is surprised by fellow MIB operative, the Gray Haired Man, who fatally shoots him. With his last strength, X crawls to Mulder's doorstep and writes in his own blood "SRSG", meaning "Special Representative to the Secretary General" of the United Nations, and thus, this clue leads Mulder to Marita Covarrubias. After his death, X appears two more times: in The Lone Gunmen origin story "Unusual Suspects," set before his death, and as a ghost in the series finale.

== The Cleaner/Crew Cut Man ==
The Cleaner, better known as Crew Cut Man, is a character from The X-Files. He is portrayed by Lindsey Ginter. The Crew Cut Man is an MIB assassin/saboteur employed by the Syndicate, specifically by the Cigarette Smoking Man. In the season one finale, "The Erlenmeyer Flask", Crew Cut Man is working with a couple of other Men in Black to terminate all evidence of a covert alien-human hybrid program, which Mulder was investigating. Mulder ends up being taken by the operatives, and, during the subsequent exchange for Mulder's life, Deep Throat is killed by Crew Cut Man.

Scully witnesses the murder and later, in the season two episode "Red Museum", she recognizes him during a case in remote Wisconsin, where secret experiments with alien DNA were being conducted. He is shot dead by a local sheriff as he tries to set fire to a warehouse where Mulder is trapped.

Like most Men in Black, little is known about Crew Cut Man. While Mulder was being held, his cell phone was left unanswered by Crew Cut Man, as he remarked that he had "this thing about unsecured lines."

== Luis Cardinal/Hispanic Man ==
Luis Cardinal, portrayed by Lenny Britos. Initially only known as "Hispanic Man", he was a Nicaraguan mercenary working for Cigarette Smoking Man. Cardinal was trained at the School of the Americas facility, and was involved in the Iran-Contra affair. While briefly partnered with Alex Krycek, he killed Scully's sister, Melissa, in a case of mistaken identity. He was also the man who shot Assistant Director Skinner, who survived. He was later taken into custody by the Washington, D.C. Police Department, and was then hanged in his cell with the appearance of suicide to keep him silent.

== Red-Haired Man ==
The Red-Haired Man, played by Stephen McHattie, is a Man in Black who worked for the First Elder, though he claimed to be an agent of the NSA. He worked as an assassin, garroting several Japanese scientists who had been working on an alien-human hybrid in the hopes of surviving colonisation. He nearly kills Mulder twice, but is eliminated by X in the season 3 episode "731". In the X-Files DVD collection, his name is given as "Malcolm Gerlach", though he is never named onscreen.

== Grey-Haired Man ==
The Grey-Haired Man, played by Morris Panych, was first shown, along with other fellow MIB operatives, attempting to deter Skinner from reopening Melissa Scully's murder investigation. In "Herrenvolk", he assassinates X per the orders of the First Elder, after the Syndicate learns that X has been leaking information to Fox Mulder. He also appeared in the episodes "Memento Mori" and "Zero Sum". The Grey-Haired Man was originally intended to be The Smoking Man's henchman, but disappeared when the actor left. He is seen as a subordinate to both The Smoking Man and the First Elder. He also comes quite close to killing Mulder, tracking him down at a Syndicate facility, but ultimately Mulder escaped thanks to a bulletproof-glass window.

== Jose Chung's Men in Black ==
Man in Black #1, played by Jesse Ventura in the comedic episode, "Jose Chung's From Outer Space". Acting more in line with (and in a parody of) real-world accounts of the Men in Black, he intimidated those who saw UFOs into questioning the reality of their accounts.

Man in Black #2, played by Alex Trebek, was the first Man in Black's partner in the same episode. As Men in Black are supposed to appear so ridiculous that stories of encountering them are widely disbelieved, this character's obvious resemblance to Trebek is played up as a plot point, with Jose Chung interrupting Scully to inquire as to whether she really meant to bring up "Alex Trebek? The game show host?"

== Plain-Clothed Man ==
The Plain-Clothed Man, played by Tim Henry, was a subordinate of X. He was used to relay information to Fox Mulder, as it was too risky at the time for X to contact Mulder personally. He is eliminated by X at the end of the episode "Wetwired", in order to cover his tracks. The character of the Plain-Clothed man was conceived as an expendable cameo, as Steven Williams, the actor who played X, had scheduling problems due to L.A. Heat, necessitating a temporary character instead.

== Dark Man/Moustache Man/Scott Garrett ==
Dark Man/Moustache Man/Scott Garrett, played by Greg Michaels, was a Man in Black employed to aid a Syndicate cover-up. whilst listed in the episode credits as "Scott Garrett", he was never named onscreen, and the credits from The X-Files DVD collection list him as "Dark Man". In spite of this, he is referred to by fans as the "Moustache Man". He was assigned to oversee a military cover-up of a plane crash caused by an alien spacecraft, deliberately sabotaging efforts to identify a former colleague who had been on the crashed plane. He accidentally killed Agent Pendrell while attempting to shoot a defecting conspirator in Scully's protection. He was later abducted by aliens whilst pursuing Mulder on a passenger flight, during an attempt to salvage alien technology.

== Scott Ostelhoff ==
Scott Ostelhoff, played by Steve Makaj, was an MIB operative with Department of Defense credentials, working for the First Elder. He was tasked with murdering the members of an expedition team that was attempting to excavate a recently discovered alien corpse, which was actually an elaborate hoax. He was assigned for an unknown length of time to surveil Fox Mulder from the apartment above his. He is killed in a confrontation with Mulder, and his face destroyed with his own shotgun so as to allow Mulder to fake his own death.

== Quiet Willy ==
Quiet Willy, played by Willy Ross, was an operative ordered by the First Elder to carry out the assassination of The Smoking Man, although this attempt was to prove unsuccessful. At a later date, he was appointed by the Well-Manicured Man to investigate the mysterious deaths by burning of Syndicate scientists involved in the human-alien hybrid program. During the course of this investigation, Quiet Willy apprehended Cassandra Spender, but was killed by the faceless rebels. His guise was later adopted by one of the Alien Bounty Hunters while tracking down one of these same rebels. Quiet Willy was never officially named in his appearances, his name being a fan coinage derived from his tacit nature and the name of the actor portraying him.

== The Shooter ==
The Shooter, played by Martin Ferrero, was a marksman who only appeared in the season 5 finale, "The End". He was a former NSA agent and Special Forces operative with experience in assassinations. On orders from the Syndicate, he attempted to kill Gibson Praise with a sniper rifle during an international chess tournament. The attempt failed, as Gibson was able to telepathically discern what was about to happen, and The Shooter was taken into police custody. While in custody, he was shot through a slot in his cell door by his fellow Man in Black, the Black-Haired Man.

== Black-Haired Man ==
The Black-Haired Man, played by Michael Shamus Wiles, is another Syndicate-employed marksman. He first appears in the season 5 finale, "The End", where he executes fellow Man in Black The Shooter. In the X-Files movie, he is seen leaving a building before it is blown up, and also surveils at least one of Fox Mulder's meetings with Alvin Kurtzweil. Later in the film, he kidnaps Scully while disguised as a paramedic, and almost kills Mulder when he fires at him point blank. He is later ordered to spy on Scully in the season 7 episode "En Ami", and almost kills her via sniper rifle, but is dispatched by his superior, The Smoking Man.

== Morris Fletcher ==
Morris Fletcher is portrayed by Michael McKean. Fletcher was in charge of keeping all of Area 51's information out of the press, by all means necessary. He has claimed that in 1979, he found a young dinner theater actor named John Gillnitz in Tulsa, Oklahoma. He set him up as the President of Iraq under the name Saddam Hussein in order to distract the American public. During his time in Area 51, Fletcher met Ronald Reagan's family and Newt Gingrich.

In 1998, as a result of an incident with UFO technology accidentally caused by General Edward Wegman, Fletcher switched minds with FBI Special Agent Fox Mulder. During his time inhabiting Mulder's body, Fletcher revealed state secrets to The Lone Gunmen and helped improve Mulder's relationship with Assistant Director Alvin Kersh. When the warp reversed itself, and Mulder and Fletcher returned to their rightful bodies, they lost all memories of the events, and only a few changes actually occurred. The following year, Fletcher was among the visitors to Def-Con 99 in Las Vegas, Nevada. Two years later he appeared on The Lone Gunmen episode "All About Yves", where the Lone Gunmen attempt to trick him into revealing information about Area 51 and government involvement in UFO cover-ups. He then finds himself aiding the Gunmen in tracking down their enigmatic acquaintance Yves Adele Harlow in the belief that she worked for Romeo 61, a government-sponsored wetworks unit.

By 2002, he had left Area 51 and was working for an international arms dealer. He staged another hoax to once again catch Harlow, the arms dealer's daughter. Using FBI Special Agents John Doggett and Monica Reyes, Fletcher tracked down Harlow and helped prevent a massive genetically engineered virus from being released in New York City. The Lone Gunmen died from the virus and Fletcher was present at their funeral.

=== Howard Grodin and Jeff Smoodge ===
Howard Grodin and Jeff Smoodge, played by Michael Buchman Silver and Scott Allan Campbell respectively, were co-workers of Morris Fletcher at Area 51.
