= Dean Haglund =

Canadian actor (born 1965)

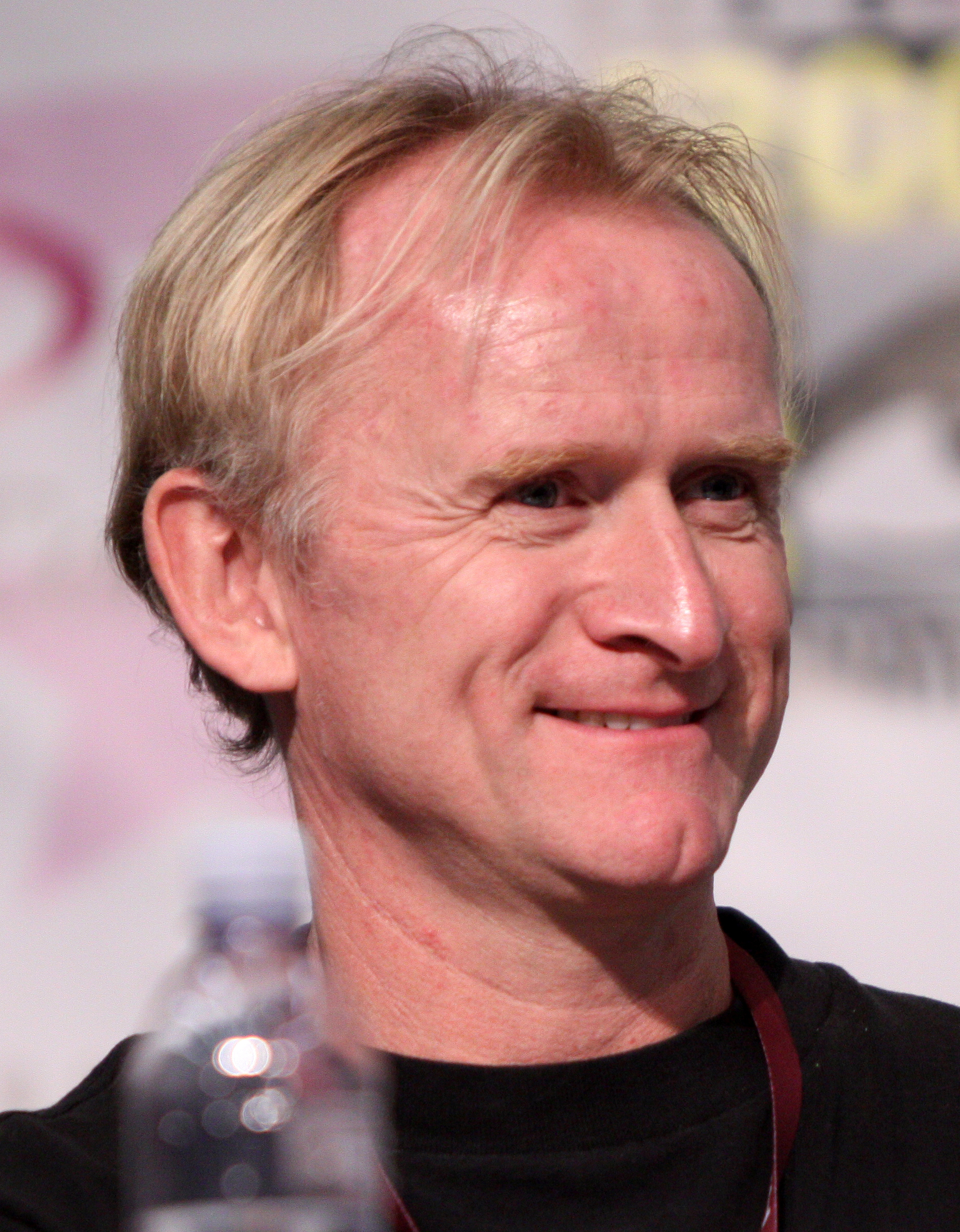
- Haglund in 2013
- Born: July 29, 1965 (age 61); Oakbank, Manitoba, Canada
- Occupations: Actor, comedian
- Years active: 1992–present

Dean Haglund (born July 29, 1965) is a Canadian actor, known for the role of Richard "Ringo" Langly, one of The Lone Gunmen on The X-Files. Haglund is also a stand-up comedian, specializing in improvisational comedy, including work with the Vancouver TheatreSports League. In addition to The X-Files, he played the voice of Sid in Tom Sawyer, Haglund also portrayed Langly in the spin-off The Lone Gunmen, which aired thirteen episodes in 2001. He is the inventor of the Chill Pak, a commercial external cooling product for laptop computers.

== Early life and education ==
Haglund was born in Oakbank, Manitoba, Canada, and is the son of a structural engineer. His father is Swedish.

== Career ==
=== Improvisational comedy ===
Haglund performed with the Vancouver TheatreSports League, an improvisational company whose performances used audience suggestions. He later described the company as his regular working base and said that he improvised each of his comedy-club sets. One recurring format involved creating a new episode of The X-Files onstage with audience members, an act he had first developed at fan conventions.

In April 1999, Haglund appeared at the fourth Big Stinkin' International Improv & Sketch Comedy Festival in Austin, Texas. At a program at the Paramount Theatre, he opened the evening with a parody of The X-Files and brought an audience member onstage to provide sound effects for the improvised segment.

Around the same period, Haglund appeared in the comedy film Radio Free Steve alongside Joy Gohring and Johanna Stein. Reviewing the film for Variety, Dennis Harvey praised its series of sketch-comedy performances and described the film as an effective parody of 1970s and 1980s popular culture.

=== Later career ===
After his roles on The X-Files and The Lone Gunmen, Haglund appeared briefly in a documentary-style production called "From Here to Andromeda", released in 2007. The production has UFOs and extraterrestrials as a central theme. On October 30, 2009, he hosted Ghost Adventures Live on the Travel Channel. In a throwback to The X-Files, Dean appeared in episode 95 of Bones as restaurant owner Blaine Miller in Roswell where Booth and Bones are sent to investigate a possible extraterrestrial sighting. He was on the advisory board of Sci-Fest, the first annual Los Angeles Science Fiction One-Act Play Festival, held in May 2014.

In June 2015, Haglund emigrated to Sydney, Australia with his girlfriend and their two dogs, and now lives in Newtown. Haglund's relocation to Australia nearly resulted in the removal of a planned cameo by the Lone Gunmen in the episode "Babylon" of the revived tenth season of The X-Files. However, he was informed by Bruce Harwood that the producers were looking for him, and contacted them to film the appearance. He currently hosts the Chillpak Hollywood Hour podcast, where he discusses all things Hollywood with independent filmmaker Phil Leirness.

== Filmography ==
=== Television ===
- The Commish (1992–1994) - Drug Dealer / Zack ("Video Vigilante" and "Working Girls")
- Street Justice (1993) - Junkie ("The Wall")
- The X-Files (1994–2018) - Richard Langly
- Sliders (1995) - Stockboy ("Fever")
- Lonesome Dove: The Series (1995) - Nathan Silas ("The Return")
- Honey, I Shrunk the Kids: The TV Show (1998) - Mr. Coolidge ("Honey, It's No Fun Being an Illegal Alien")
- Home Improvement (1999) - Guy ("Young at Heart")
- V.I.P. (1999–2000) - Himself ("Val Goes to Town" and "Throw Val from the Train")
- The Lone Gunmen (2001) - Richard Langly
- Bones (2010) - Blaine Miller ("The X in the Files")
- Femme Fatales (2011) - Kip ("Girls Gone Dead")
- The Icarus II Project (2011) - Bernie ("Jessica")

=== Film ===
- The X-Files (1998) - Richard Langly
- Radio Free Steve (2000) - Himself
- Spectres (2004) - Dr. Halsey
- Face of Terror (2004) - Timmons
- Dead & Deader (2006) - Funeral Home Director (TV Movie)
- Atlantis Down (2010) - Jack Spano
- Geek USA (2013) - Sloan
- The Lady Killers (2017) - Paul Lewis

=== Video games ===
- The X-Files: Resist or Serve (2004) - Richard Langly
