= Tom Braidwood =

Canadian actor and director

- Born: September 27, 1948 (age 77); British Columbia, Canada
- Occupation: actor
- Years active: 1977–2010, 2016
- Spouse: Trudy Braidwood
- Children: 2

Tom Braidwood (born September 27, 1948) is a Canadian actor and director known for the role of Melvin Frohike, one of the conspiracy theorists known as The Lone Gunmen on the American television series The X-Files. Braidwood also served as an assistant director on the show from seasons one through five; was a second unit director on Millennium, another series from Chris Carter, the creator of The X-Files; and a producer of the second season of the Canadian TV series Da Vinci's Inquest, on which he also directed some episodes.

== Life and career ==
Braidwood was born on September 27, 1948 in British Columbia, Canada to Darrell and Barbara (née McGibbon) Braidwood. Braidwood's career started in 1977, working as a production assistant, location manager, assistant director, and occasional actor and writer for numerous productions in the Vancouver area. He has a small role in the 1985 film My American Cousin, and wrote an episode of the Canadian TV series Danger Bay (on which he was also an assistant director). He can also be glimpsed in a very small non-speaking bit part on 21 Jump Street, another show on which he served as an assistant director.

While serving as an assistant director on The X-Files in 1994, Braidwood was identified by a casting director on the show as being ideal for the small one-time role of a seedy, intense, but generally friendly conspiracy theorist. Braidwood's initially one-shot part as Frohike developed into a recurring character, seen in 39 episodes across all nine seasons of the original run of the show. In addition to The X-Files, Braidwood also co-starred as Frohike in the spin-off series The Lone Gunmen, which aired 13 episodes in 2001. In 2006, Braidwood appeared in two episodes of the series Whistler, and in 2009 appeared in the movies Messages Deleted and Alien Trespass.

Braidwood essentially retired from both acting and production work around 2010, but returned to reprise the role of Frohike in a single episode of The X-Files revival series in 2016.
