= Bruce Harwood =

Canadian actor (born 1963)

- Born: April 29, 1963 (age 63); North Vancouver, British Columbia, Canada
- Years active: 1987-present
- Spouse: Heather Harwood (m. 1989)

Bruce Harwood (born April 29, 1963) is a Canadian character actor best known for his role of John Fitzgerald Byers, one of The Lone Gunmen on the television series The X-Files. In addition to The X-Files, Harwood portrayed Byers in the spin-off series The Lone Gunmen, which aired thirteen episodes in 2001. He has also played other roles with a strong similarity to Byers, such as Willis, a technician from the Phoenix Foundation in MacGyver, and government-scientist-turned-conspiracy-theorist Dr. Avery Strong in The Outer Limits. He was a founding member of the Vancouver summer Shakespeare festival, Bard on the Beach. He also starred in the 1988 movie Earth Star Voyager.

== Filmography ==
=== Film ===
Year	Title	Role	Notes
1989	The Fly II	Technician	
1991	Bingo	Network Executive	
1995	Beauty's Revenge	Cameraman	Television movie
1995	Bye Bye Birdie	Reporter #1	Television movie
1998	The X-Files	Byers	
2000	The Guilty	Miles	
2001	Death Train to the Pacific	CP Railway Director	Television movie
2006	The Psychic Life of Plants	Doctor	Short film
2007	The Last Mimzy	Scientist	
2008	Personal Effects	Record Man	
2010	Daydream Nation	My. Myers	
2011	Christmas Comes to Canaan	Maitre D'	Television movie

=== Television ===
Year	Title	Role	Notes
1987	MacGyver	Juice	Episode: "Blow Out"
1988	21 Jump Street	Bruce	Episode: "Hell Week"
1988	Walt Disney's Wonderful World of Color	Dr. Eugene	Episode: "Earth Star Voyager: Part 1"
1988	Danger Bay	Joe	Episode: "The Return of Sugar Ray"
1989	The Beachcombers	Xavier	Episode: "Club Laundromat"
1989	Wiseguy	Messenger	Episode: "Day Seven"
1990–1991	MacGyver	Willis	4 episodes
1990	21 Jump Street	Engineer	Episode: "Research and Destroy"
1994–2002	The X-Files	John Fitzgerald Byers	36 episodes
1995	The Outer Limits	Technician	Episode: "Valerie 23"
1996	The Outer Limits	Dr. Norris	Episode: "Trial by Fire"
1997	The Sentinel	Barry	Episode: "Warriors"
1997	The Outer Limits	Dr. Avery Strong	Episode: "A Special Edition"
1998	Honey, I Shrunk the Kids: The TV Show	Mr. Lincoln	Episode: "Honey, It's No Fun Being an Illegal Alien"
1999	The Outer Limits	Miles Pendergast	Episode: "What Will the Neighbors Think?"
2001	The Lone Gunmen	John Fitzgerald Byers	13 episodes
2001	Andromeda	Philip Kim	Episode: "All Too Human"
2002	Stargate SG-1	Dr. Osbourne	Episode: "Frozen"
2004	The L Word	Hotel Manager	Episode: "Lies, Lies, Lies"
2004	Smallville	Ben Powell	Episode: "Resurrection"
2004	Alienated	Professor #2	Episode: "Human Gas"
2004	Kingdom Hospital	Fred Beagle	Episode: "Shoulda' Stood in Bed"
2007	Whistler	Graeme	2 episodes
2011	Endgame	Lester	Episode: "Gorillas in Our Midst"
2012	Emily Owens, M.D.	Anesthesiologist	Episode: "Emily and...The Good and the Bad"
2014–2015	When Calls the Heart	Mayor Silas Ramsey	4 episodes
2014	Psych	Health Inspector	Episode: "Shawn and Gus Truck Things Up"
2014	The Flash	Dexter Myles	Episode: "Going Rogue"
2016	The X-Files	John Fitzgerald Byers	Episode: "Babylon"
2020	Batwoman	Professor Darby	Episode: "O, Mouse!"

=== Video games ===
Year	Title	Role	Notes
2004	The X-Files: Resist or Serve	John Fitzgerald Byers	
