= Clayton Rohner =

American actor

- Born: Clayton Montague Rohner; August 5, 1957 (age 69); Palo Alto, California, U.S.
- Education: Whitman College
- Occupation: Actor
- Years active: 1981–present

Clayton Montague Rohner (born August 5, 1957) is an American actor. He made his film debut in the comedy Just One of the Guys (1985), and had subsequent roles in the horror films April Fool's Day (1986), Bat 21 (1988), I, Madman (1989), and The Relic (1997). He had a recurring role on the television series Murder One (1996–1997) and Day Break (2006–2007). In 2006, Clayton guest starred in the television series Bones, and in 2017, Rohner guest-starred on the series Ozark.

== Biography ==
Rohner was born August 5, 1957 in Palo Alto, California and raised in Los Angeles. He graduated with a Bachelor of Arts degree in theater from Whitman College, where he was a member of the Beta Theta Pi fraternity.

He is known for his role as Rick Morehouse in the 1985 comedy movie Just One of the Guys. He also starred in the 1986 film Modern Girls as Clifford and Bruno X. He is a main character in the 1994 film Caroline at Midnight. Other credits include the films April Fool's Day, Destroyer, The Relic, and The Human Centipede 3 (Final Sequence). Clayton starred in the short-lived science fiction series E.A.R.T.H. Force and G vs E, and in the 2005 film Formosa.

Rohner appeared on the TV series Murder One as Detective Vince Biggio from 1996 to 1997. His television guest appearances include Miami Vice, Beverly Hills, 90210, Charmed, Crossing Jordan, Angel, and Weeds. In the Star Trek: The Next Generation episode "Too Short a Season," Rohner played the elderly Starfleet Admiral Mark Jameson, who administers an alien medicine to himself and rapidly de-ages; his wife was played by Marsha Hunt. Director Rob Bowman later noted that working with Rohner on the episode was "a real treat," adding that the two spent extensive time off-camera developing the character of Jameson. Rohner also appeared in the award-winning series Into the West and The X-Files (season 6, episode 8). He also appeared in the TV role of Jared Pryor in the short-lived ABC midseason replacement Day Break.

== Filmography ==
Film
Year	Title	Role	Notes
1985	Just One of the Guys	Rick Morehouse	
1986	April Fool's Day	Chaz	
1986	Modern Girls	Clifford / Bruno X	
1987	P.I. Private Investigations	Joey Bradley	
1988	Destroyer	David Harris	
1988	Bat*21	Sgt. Harley Rumbaugh	
1988	Deadly Intent	Scott	Direct-to-Video
1989	I, Madman	Richard	
1989	Nightwish	Jack	
1992	The Naked Target	Adam Kent	
1994	Caroline at Midnight	Jack Lynch	
1996	Naked Souls	Jerry	
1997	The Relic	Det. Hollingsworth	
1998	Where's Marlowe?	Sonny 'Beep' Collins	
1998	Sometimes They Come Back... for More	Captain Sam Cage	Direct-to-Video
1999	The Big Day	Zack	
2003	Coronado	Arnet McClure	
2005	Formosa	Ted Gregory	Also known as: Social Guidance
2008	The Essence of Depp	Dick Rico	
2009	Shrink	Dr. McBurney	
2013	Jobs	Financial Expert	
2013	From Above	Mr. Shelton	Also known as: Chasing Shakespeare
2013	Black Asylum	Ben	Short
2013	Eat Spirit Eat	Dwight	
2014	Under the Hollywood Sign	Phil	
2014	Blood Ransom	Rich White Guy	
2015	The Human Centipede 3 (Final Sequence)	Dr. Jones	
2015	Prep School	Dr. Swanson	
2016	I Was a Teenage Wereskunk	Harold	
2016	Honeyglue	Doctor Colson	
2017	Daisy Winter	Bill Sr	
2018	We Are Boats	Robert	
2019	Mope	Dad	
2020	The Goose That Laid the Golden Egg	Barry Naliboff	

Television
Year	Title	Role	Notes
1981–1983	Hill Street Blues	Shamrock / Gawker / Juvenile	4 episodes
1982	Desperate Lives	Monte	TV movie
1983	T.J. Hooker	Richie	1 Episode, The Fast Lane
1983	The Kid with the 200 I.Q.	Jeff Langford	TV movie
1986	Miami Vice	Timmy Davis	1 Episode, Yankee Dollar
1987	The Hitchhiker	Harry Deakon	1 Episode, Doctor's Orders
1987	L.A. Law	Patrick Boyd	1 Episode, Rohner vs. Gradinger
1988	Star Trek: The Next Generation	Admiral Mark Jameson	1 Episode, Too Short a Season
1988	Police Story: Monster Manor	Officer Gene Pardonales	TV movie
1990	Snow Kill	Dennis	TV movie
1990	E.A.R.T.H. Force	Carl Dana	1 Episode, Episode #1.1
1994	Beverly Hills, 90210	Dr. Fox	1 Episode, The Dreams of Dylan McKay
1995	NYPD Blue	Earl Padzik	1 Episode, The Bookie and the Kooky Cookie
1996–1997	Murder One	Detective Vince Biggio	18 episodes
1997	Murder One: Diary of a Serial Killer	Detective Vince Biggio	TV mini-series
1998	Little Girl Fly Away	Detective Tom Pyne	TV movie
1998	L.A. Doctors	Warren Spillman	2 episodes
1999	The X-Files	Daryl Mootz	1 Episode, The Rain King
1999	WWE Raw	Chandler Smythe	1 Episode, Episode #7.40
1999–2000	G vs E	Chandler Smythe	22 episodes
2000	Charmed	Drazi	1 Episode, Heartbreak City
2000	Border Patrol	Cal Newman	TV movie
2001	Jack & Jill	Dante	3 episodes
2001	CSI: Crime Scene Investigation	Forest Ranger	1 Episode, You've Got Male
2002	Angel	Lee DeMarco	1 Episode, The House Always Wins
2003	Crossing Jordan	Henry Ross	1 Episode, Conspiracy
2004	Jake 2.0	Alex Brandt	1 Episode, Dead Man Walking
2005	Into the West	James Strobridge	1 Episode, Hell on Wheels
2005	Weeds	Coach Dad	1 Episode, You Can't Miss the Bear
2006	Bones	Wayne Kellogg	1 Episode, The Skull in the Desert
2006–2007	Day Break	Jared Pryor	5 episodes
2007	Marlowe		TV film
2009	ER	Roger Anderson	1 Episode, And in the End...
2009	The Mentalist	Asher MacLean	1 Episode, Blood Brothers
2009	Dollhouse	Dollhouse Client	2 episodes
2009	Castle	John McGinnis	1 Episode, Famous Last Words
2010	Burn Notice	Nick Madison	1 Episode, Breach of Faith
2011	Borderline Murder	Dr. Victor Sparks	TV movie
2013	Justified	Man at the Party	1 Episode, Money Trap
2014	Jack's Jacuze	Jack	TV mini-series
2016	Assistant Living Show	Montgomery Malcolm	TV movie
2017	Ozark	Hanson Sr.	1 Episode, Sugarwood
2017	Stitchers	Rudy Grant	1 Episode, Dreamland
2017	SuperHigh	Bruce	7 episodes
