= Jay Baker (actor) =

American actor, producer, and television host

- Born: April 12, 1961 (age 65); Sweetwater, Tennessee, United States
- Occupations: Actor, producer, television host
- Years active: 1978–present
- Children: 2

Jay Wayne Baker (born April 12, 1961) is an American actor, producer, and television host.

== Biography ==
Jay was born in Sweetwater, Tennessee, and is an alumnus of Tennessee Military Institute, where he was in the drama program. Jay's professional career began in 1978 as a musical stage performer. He was based in Los Angeles until 2001, appearing in movies and television. In 2001, he moved back to his native Tennessee and began focusing his talents on production and hosting of DIY-themed television programs.

== Filmography ==
=== Film ===
Year	Film	Role
1984	Toy Soldiers	Jeff
1986	April Fool's Day	Harvey "Hal" Edison Jr.
1989	Shag	Big Bob
1993	Sunset Grill	Ken
1994	Caroline at Midnight	Policeman
1995	The Feminine Touch (aka The November Conspiracy)	Det. Jimmy McGraw
1998	Naked Lies	Mitch Kendall

=== Television ===
Year	Show	Role	Notes
1982	The Dukes of Hazzard	Jeb Morton	Episode: "Dukes Strike It Rich"
1985	The Best Times	Tony Younger	6 episodes
1987	The Alamo: 13 Days to Glory	Hayes	TV movie
1988	Frank's Place	John Delesseps	Episode: "Shorty's Belle"
1988	The Incredible Hulk Returns	Zack Lambert	TV movie
1988-89	It's a Living	Bobby Lee Lord	3 episodes
1990	Storm and Sorrow	Robert 'Bob' Strand	TV movie
1995	Renegade	Leslie	Episode: "Family Ties"
1995	Silk Stalkings	Paul Clifton	Episode: "The Lonely Hunter"
1995	Star Trek: Deep Space Nine	Stevens	Episode: "Starship Down"
1996	Savannah	Harry	3 episodes
1997	Baywatch	Veterinarian	Episode: "Baywatch at Sea World"
2003	Floors, Doors & Windows	Host	TV series
2003	The Ultimate Workshop II	Host	TV mini-series
2005	Build an Outdoor Kitchen	Host	TV series
2008	Project Paradise	Host	TV series
2008	Move It Outside	Host	TV series
2008	Bonus Room Breakout	Host	TV series
2011	Backyard Blowout	Host	TV series
2012	The Hot List	Host	TV series
2012	Turf War	Host	TV series

=== Producer ===
Year	Film	Notes
2003	DIY to the Rescue	TV series
2005	Grounds for Improvement	TV series
2006	Wasted Spaces	TV series, co-producer
2007	Blog Cabin	TV series
2013	Kitchen Crashers	TV series
