= April Fool's Day (1986 film) =

1986 film by Fred Walton

- Theatrical release poster
- Directed by: Fred Walton
- Written by: Danilo Bach
- Produced by: Frank Mancuso Jr.
- Starring: Jay Baker; Deborah Foreman; Deborah Goodrich; Ken Olandt; Griffin O'Neal; Leah King Pinsent; Clayton Rohner; Amy Steel; Thomas F. Wilson
- Cinematography: Charles Minsky
- Edited by: Bruce Green
- Music by: Charles Bernstein
- Production company: Hometown Films
- Distributed by: Paramount Pictures
- Release date: March 27, 1986
- Running time: 89 minutes
- Country: United States
- Language: English
- Budget: $5 million
- Box office: $13 million

April Fool's Day is a 1986 American mystery slasher film directed by Fred Walton, produced by Frank Mancuso Jr., and starring Jay Baker, Deborah Foreman, Deborah Goodrich, Ken Olandt, Griffin O'Neal, Leah King Pinsent, Clayton Rohner, Amy Steel, and Thomas F. Wilson. The plot follows a group of college students vacationing during April Fool's Day weekend on an island estate, which is infiltrated by an unknown assailant.

Filmed in Victoria, British Columbia, in 1985, April Fool's Day was released on March 27, 1986, by Paramount Pictures in conjunction with the April 1 holiday. It received varied responses from film critics, with some commending it for its non-gratuitous violence and plot twists, while others lambasted it for its surprise ending. A remake of the film was released direct-to-video in 2008.

== Plot ==
On the weekend leading up to April Fools' Day, a group of college friends, consisting of Harvey Edison, Nikki Brashares, Rob Ferris, Skip St. John, Nan Youngblood, Chaz Vyshinski, Kit Graham, and Arch Cummings, gather to celebrate spring break by spending the weekend at the island mansion of Skip's cousin and Vassar student Muffy St. John. As Muffy prepares details around the house, she finds an old jack-in-the-box and recalls receiving the toy at a childhood birthday party. Her friends, meanwhile, joke around on the pier while awaiting the ferry. En route to the island, as their antics become more boisterous, local deckhand Buck is seriously injured in a gruesome accident.

Once on the island, it turns out that Muffy has set up a variety of pranks throughout the mansion, ranging from simple gags such as a whoopee cushion, dribble glasses, and exploding cigars to more complex and disturbing pranks, such as an audiotape of a baby crying in Nan's room and heroin paraphernalia in Arch's wardrobe. Despite this, the group tries to relax, until Skip goes missing, and Kit catches a glimpse of what looks like his dead body. Soon, Arch and Nan also go missing. During a search for the pair, Nikki falls into the island's well, where she finds the severed heads of Skip and Arch, along with the dead body of Nan. The remaining group members then discover that there is no way to get off the island until Monday.

One after another, members of the group either vanish or get killed, and their bodies are later found. After putting some clues together, Kit and Rob realize that everyone's earlier assumption is wrong. It also turns out that Muffy has a violently insane twin sister named Buffy, who has escaped. The "Muffy" they have been around since the morning after the first night was Buffy, pretending to be Muffy. They discover Muffy's severed head in the basement.

Buffy chases them with a curved butcher's knife, and the couple gets separated. Kit flees from Buffy by escaping into the living room, where she finds everyone else alive and calmly waiting for her. It was all a joke, or more accurately, a dress rehearsal. Muffy reveals that she hopes to turn the mansion into a country inn offering a weekend of staged horror. She even had Buck, a friend who does special effects and make-up in Hollywood, help. Each "victim" agreed to participate as the pranks were explained to them. Muffy also reveals that Buffy is not real, and that her twin is actually Skip. Everyone has a huge laugh, and they break out many bottles of champagne.

Later that night, a slightly drunk Muffy enters her room and finds a wrapped present on her bed. She unwraps it, and the present is a nondescript jack-in-the-box. Savoring the surprise, she turns the handle slowly and when "Jack" finally pops out, Nan, who knew Muffy from acting class, emerges from behind her and slits her throat with a razor. Muffy screams, but then realizes she is not bleeding and that Nan used a trick razor and stage blood. Lying on its side, the jack-in-the-box winks.

== Cast ==
- Jay Baker as Harvey "Hal" Edison Jr.
- Deborah Foreman as Muffy and Buffy St. John
- Deborah Goodrich as Nikki Brashares
- Ken Olandt as Rob Ferris
- Griffin O'Neal as Skip St. John
- Leah King Pinsent as Nan Youngblood
- Clayton Rohner as Chaz Vyshinski
- Amy Steel as Kit Graham
- Thomas F. Wilson as Arch Cummings
- Lloyd Beery as ferryman
- Pat Barlow as Clara
- Tom Heaton as Constable Potter / Uncle Frank
- Mike Nomad as Buck

== Production ==
=== Casting ===
Amy Steel was cast in the role of Kit Graham at the suggestion of producer Frank Mancuso Jr., after Steel had appeared in Mancuso's Friday the 13th Part 2 (1981). In the role of Muffy St. John, the young college student who holds the gathering at her familial mansion, Deborah Foreman (who had recently starred opposite Nicolas Cage in Valley Girl), auditioned for the role. Fred Walton recalled that he cast Foreman after she "blew them away" during her audition.

=== Filming ===
After considering shooting the film at Martha's Vineyard, Massachusetts and Seattle, Washington, producer Frank Mancuso Jr. chose to shoot the film on Vancouver Island in Victoria, British Columbia near Saanich. Filming took place in the summer of 1985 over a period of six weeks at two private properties in Victoria, with principal photography scheduled to complete on September 21. Walton reflect that the cast was made up of a "young, very talented group of kids that were having a lot of fun". The production budget for the film was $5 million.

=== Post-production ===
An additional final sequence in the film, present in Walton's original cut, had the group leaving the island, and Skip enacting an actual murder of Muffy, wanting to take their familial inheritance for himself. Paramount executives disliked this dark turn, and mandated that this final sequence be excised so that the film could end on a high note, with the characters celebrating after the revelation of Muffy's elaborate prank.

== Release ==
April Fool's Day was released theatrically in the United States on 1,202 screens on March 27, 1986.

=== Home media ===
For its home video premiere in the 1980s, it was released to both videocassette and LaserDisc. It has since been released to DVD on four occasions. The first edition was made available on September 3, 2002, through Paramount Home Entertainment. It was then included as one of the films on a triple-feature disc that also included Tales from the Darkside: The Movie and Stephen King's Graveyard Shift in August 2007. Eight months later, in March 2008, it was offered as a double feature with My Bloody Valentine (1981), and again as a standalone release in 2013.

Scream Factory released the film for the first time on Blu-ray in a collector's edition; the Blu-ray was released on March 24, 2020. Kino Lorber issued the film in 4K UHD Blu-ray format on January 21, 2025.

== Reception ==
=== Box office ===
The film earned $3.4 million during its opening weekend in the United States, and eventually grossed $13 million domestically. Though a commercial success, director Walton reflected: "The tragedy, I think, or the great disappointment was that Paramount didn't know how to release it other than as a typical slasher picture. So most audiences came in expecting to see something that they weren't going to see".

=== Critical response ===
Paul Attanasio of The Washington Post wrote: "The suspense sequences are stylishly managed, and Walton has attractively cast the movie with a number of natural, if unexciting, actors. There is a suburban princess and a jock and a Junior Achievement type and so forth, none of which qualifies Bach for screenwriter of the year, but it's remarkable how effective even these elementary efforts at characterization are in the context of the film". Reviewing the film in The New York Times, Vincent Canby criticized the film's dialogue, its plot, where "nothing in the film is quite what it seems to be, not always intentionally" and the characters, for being "as interchangeable as the actors who play them". Writing for The Baltimore Sun, Lou Cedrone addressed the film's muted violence as a response to public criticism of the overt violence in Paramount's Friday the 13th films, and noted that, despite its marketing, he did not view it as a slasher film. The Dayton Journal Herald's Terry Lawson gave the film a three out of four-star rating, praising it as a "well-made and well-acted little enterprise [that] holds a surprise or two". Jeff Rietveld of the Santa Clarita Signal praised the film as "a slasher film for people who don't like slasher films", also commending the acting and direction.

Jay Maeder of the New York Daily News gave the film a scathing review, awarding it zero stars and spoiling the film's surprise ending, writing that it "is so offensively witless that we take a real pleasure in giving it away". Joe Baltake of the Escondido Times-Advocate panned the film based on its sexual content, comparing it to the Friday the 13th series, adding that "none of the mayhem keeps its characters from putting the make on one another or even stopping to have sex. Some of the screams in the night here could imply either brutality or sexuality. April Fool's Day is a film that confuses the two".

AllMovie noted that the film "has more rollercoaster thrills than most slasher flicks with five times the gore", writing: "Amid the glut of gory horror films that clogged the cable schedules and cineplexes in the wake of Halloween and Friday the 13th, April Fool's Day stands out as a fairly restrained exercise in the '80s teen slasher genre". Steve Barton of Dread Central wrote in 2008 that he considers the film "a modern horror classic".

On the review aggregator website Rotten Tomatoes, 64% of 28 critics' reviews are positive. The website's consensus reads: "April Fool's Day takes a decent stab at deconstructing the slasher genre, but an underwhelming story keeps it from really sinking in." Metacritic, which uses a weighted average, assigned the film a score of 49 out of 100, based on 7 critics, indicating "mixed or average" reviews.

Critics also noted how the film borrows elements from Agatha Christie's 1939 novel And Then There Were None and that this is openly acknowledged in the dialogue.

== Soundtrack ==
A soundtrack for the film was released in 1986 on vinyl only. The soundtrack consists of 19 cues and runs approximately 30:27. In 2015, as part of Varèse Sarabande's LP to CD subscription series, the vinyl album was released on cd for the first time in a replica vinyl cardboard slip.

Track listing

1. "Intro"
2. "Main Title"
3. "Choke a Dagger"
4. "Pier Pressure"
5. "All's Well That Ends"
6. "Snakes Alive"
7. "Stab in the Dark"
8. "Hanging Around"
9. "The House"
10. "Trick or Threat"
11. "Nan in Danger"
12. "Nightwatch"
13. "Sitting Duck"
14. "Night"
15. "Getting the Point"
16. "Little Miss Muffy"
17. "Muffy Attack"
18. "First Victim"
19. "Hack-in-the-Box"

== Related works ==
A novelization of the film by Jeff Rovin was published in 1986 by Pocket Books alongside its theatrical release. This novelization features an alternate ending in which Skip sneaks back onto the island after everyone has left to kill Muffy for his share of the family money, though he fails and winds up dead himself. This ending has never been released, but stills of it have surfaced. A revised draft of the script included another version of the above-mentioned ending in which Skip sneaks back onto the island to kill Muffy. He springs out of a closet and cuts her throat. At first panics then realizes it's all a joke when she sees her friends standing around. The script then states that Skip stays on the island to help Muffy with the bed and breakfast.

A straight-to-DVD remake was released in March 2008. Though it retains the original concept, the story and characters are radically altered in an effort to make it more contemporary.

== See also ==
- Slaughter High with a similar theme

== Works cited ==
- Rockoff, Adam (2011). Going to Pieces: The Rise and Fall of the Slasher Film. Jefferson, North Carolina: McFarland. ISBN 978-0-786-46932-1.
