= Destroyer (1988 film) =

1988 US horror film by Robert Kirk

- Directed by: Robert Kirk
- Written by: Peter Garrity, Rex Hauck, Mark W. Rosenbaum
- Produced by: Peter Garrity; Rex Hauck
- Starring: Lyle Alzado; Clayton Rohner; Deborah Foreman; Anthony Perkins
- Cinematography: Chuy Elizondo
- Edited by: Mark W. Rosenbaum
- Music by: Patrick O'Hearn
- Distributed by: The Movie Store (TMS Pictures)
- Release date: September 28, 1988
- Running time: 94 minutes
- Country: United States
- Language: English

Destroyer (also known as Shadow of Death) is a 1988 American slasher film directed by Robert Kirk, and starring Lyle Alzado, Clayton Rohner, Deborah Foreman, and Anthony Perkins.

== Plot ==
Ivan Moser (Lyle Alzado) is a serial killer who has been convicted of the rape, torture, and murder of 23 people. Moser is given the death penalty by electrocution. At his execution, he boasts of having killed 24 people. A power outage caused by a riot prevents the execution, but Moser receives a jolt of electricity before the power fails. The prison staff assumes that Moser is killed during the riot, but he manages to escape. The prison subsequently is abandoned. Moser lives within the abandoned prison with the assistance of his father, who had been employed as a guard. Eighteen months later, a film crew arrives at the prison to shoot an exploitation film entitled Death House Dolls. Two of the crew are the main characters, Susan (a stunt performer) and David (a screenwriter). They discover that Moser survived his electrocution due to an unusual genetic gift. The jolt of electrical energy made him "half-alive", leaving him in a feral state and granting him spontaneous regeneration.

== Cast ==
- Deborah Foreman as Susan Malone
- Clayton Rohner as David Harris
- Lyle Alzado as Ivan Moser
- Anthony Perkins as Robert Edwards

== Theatrical release and home media ==
The film was released theatrically in the United States by The Movie Store on September 28, 1988. It was also released on VHS and LaserDisc by Virgin Vision that same year.

Scream Factory released the film on Blu-ray in a double feature with Edge of Sanity in 2016.

== Reception ==
Although the cast was praised, particularly Alzado and Perkins, the film received mostly negative reviews.

David Nusair of Reel Film Reviews was disappointed by the film, gave it 2 out of 4 and wrote: "Rarely as much fun as one might've anticipated (and hoped)..."
