= Deborah Foreman =

American actress (born 1962)

- Born: Deborah Lynn Foreman; October 12, 1962 (age 63); Montebello, California, U.S.
- Occupations: Actress, photographer, designer
- Years active: 1981–present

Deborah Lynn Foreman (born October 12, 1962) is an American actress. She is perhaps best known for her starring role in the 1983 film Valley Girl opposite Nicolas Cage. She is also regarded as a scream queen and known for playing in various horror films of the 1980s, such as April Fool's Day, Waxwork, Destroyer and Sundown: The Vampire in Retreat.

== Early life ==
Foreman was born October 12, 1962, in Montebello, California, the daughter of Lynette and Clyde Foreman, a Marine Corps pilot. She was raised in Arizona and Texas. When she was 13, her parents enrolled her at the Barbizon School of Modeling in Houston to help her overcome shyness, where she received a trophy after completing the courses. In high school, Foreman received high marks and was a cheerleader. While she was still a student, local photographer Wally Lewis hired her for newspaper and catalog ads. A chance meeting with a representative of Wilhelmina Models led to her signing with its California office and modeling assignments for Maybelline cosmetics.

== Career ==
Four weeks after arriving in Los Angeles, Foreman earned her SAG card after appearing in a McDonald's of England commercial. Resolving to become a serious actress, she took acting lessons from a variety of teachers. Her first acting job was in a comedy pilot for NBC's The Grady Nutt Show. More television work and two supporting film roles soon followed. After a 1983 appearance on the popular sitcom Family Ties, her first starring role in a feature film was Valley Girl (1983) with the then-little-known Nicolas Cage, which brought her national fame. The New York Times reviewer did not care for Valley Girl and wrote that Foreman was "too passive to carry the movie" while her counterpart at the Los Angeles Times enjoyed the same movie. Mark Deming of AllMovie wrote that Foreman "made an indelible impression on fans of 1980s pop culture with her performance in the title role of the film Valley Girl".

In 1985, Foreman had a small role in the comedy film Real Genius. In 1986, she was named "Most Promising New Star" by ShoWest, the largest and most notable film convention in the world.

She had a starring role in the comedy film My Chauffeur (1986), in which she played a somewhat Madonna-influenced character who gets a job as a driver for a stuffy limousine service. My Chauffeur was publicized widely, but connected only modestly with teen audiences and critics. The New York Times reviewer Lawrence Van Gelder wrote "Miss Foreman, who with discipline and far better script might become an engaging comedienne, is mired here in a character who at one moment is delivering a lecture on proper treatment of women and at the next is smirking." The Los Angeles Times reviewer Michael Wilmington called Foreman a "New Wave Carole Lombard crossed with early Shirley MacLaine". However, Robert Blau of the Chicago Tribune wrote that Foreman "gives a breathlessly irritating portrayal of Casey". By contrast, Charles Taylor of the Boston Phoenix wrote that Foreman "is an appealing comic actress who goes at even the most inane situations with tireless enthusiasm and dimpley sex appeal" and although "she can't salvage My Chauffeur, she does give perkiness a good name."

That same year, Foreman played dual roles in the offbeat dark comedy and preppy murder mystery April Fool's Day. Although her performance was praised by reviewers, the film's plot and surprise ending were widely panned, with critic Vincent Canby commenting for The New York Times: "... the dialogue is mostly composed of rude variations on 'eek,' 'ugh', and 'I'd like to sleep with you this evening.'" The reviewer for AllMovie wrote "With her Sheryl Lee-like features and facial expressions, Deborah Foreman makes an appealingly off-balance scream queen".

During the five years following, Foreman appeared in over half a dozen low-budget horror movies and independent films. Syndicated columnist Joe Bob Briggs gave Foreman a "Drive-in Academy Award nomination as the damsel in distress" for saying "It's all very simple! Bunny men from Neptune have invaded Mars!"

Though she retired from acting in 1991, Foreman did make a brief appearance in the music video "Must Be The One" for the rock band She Wants Revenge, as well as a small cameo as a shopgirl in the 2020 remake of Valley Girl, her best known film.

== Filmography ==
=== Film ===
Year	Title	Role	Notes
1982	Love in the Present Tense	Heather Jenkins	
1982	I'm Dancing as Fast as I Can	Cindy	
1983	Valley Girl	Julie Richman	
1983	Grizzly II: Revenge	Chrissy, The Park Ranger's Daughter	Released in 2021
1985	Real Genius	Susan Decker	
1986	Charlie Barnett's Terms of Enrollment	Coed/Recruiter	
1986	My Chauffeur	Casey Meadows	
1986	April Fool's Day	Muffy/Buffy St. John	
1986	3:15	Sherry Havilland	
1988	Waxwork	Sarah Brightman	
1988	Destroyer	Susan Malone	
1989	Friends, Lovers, & Lunatics	Annie	
1989	The Experts	Jill	
1989	Lobster Man from Mars	Mary	
1989	Sundown: The Vampire in Retreat	Sandy White	
1991	Lunatics: A Love Story	Nancy	
2007	Beautiful Loser	Carly	
2020	Valley Girl	Shopgirl	Cameo appearance
2023	The Demons Within	Nurse Didi	

=== Television ===
Year	Title	Role	Notes
1981	The Grady Nutt Show	Becky Williams	Unsold pilot
1982	In the Custody of Strangers	Karen	TV movie
1982	T. J. Hooker	Alise Edwards / Jenny Clark	2 episodes: God Bless the Child, Deadly Ambition
1983	Romance Theatre	Heather Jenkins	5 episodes
1983	Family Ties	Mary Catherine	1 Episode: Stage Fright
1984	Hot Pursuit	Jody	2 episodes: Home Is the Heart: Part 1 & 2
1986	Maggie	Alyce Farnsworth	TV pilot for CBS
1991	MacGyver	Beth Webb	1 Episode: Eye of Osiris
1995	The Marshal	Callie Fetter	1 Episode: Gone Fishing
