= How the Ghosts Stole Christmas =

- The X-Files episode
- Mulder and Scully discover corpses underneath the floorboards. The origins of the episode stemmed from an idea Chris Carter and Frank Spotnitz had featuring a haunted house.
- Episode no.: Season 6 Episode 6
- Directed by: Chris Carter
- Written by: Chris Carter
- Production code: 6ABX08
- Original air date: December 13, 1998
- Running time: 44 minutes

Guest appearances
- Ed Asner as Maurice; Lily Tomlin as Lyda

Episode chronology
← Previous "Dreamland II"	Next → "Terms of Endearment"
- The X-Files season 6

"How the Ghosts Stole Christmas" is the sixth episode of the sixth season of the science fiction television series The X-Files. It premiered on the Fox network on December 13, 1998. It was written and directed by series creator Chris Carter, and featured guest appearances by Edward Asner and Lily Tomlin. The episode is a "Monster-of-the-Week" story, unconnected to the series' wider mythology. "How the Ghosts Stole Christmas" earned a Nielsen household rating of 10.6, being watched by 17.3 million people in its initial broadcast. The episode received mostly positive reviews from critics, although some reviews criticized the episode for over-simplifying the characters.

The show centers on FBI special agents Fox Mulder (David Duchovny) and Dana Scully (Gillian Anderson) who work on cases linked to the paranormal, called X-Files. Mulder is a believer in the paranormal, while the skeptical Scully has been assigned to debunk his work. In this Christmas-themed episode, Mulder and Scully stake out a reputed haunted house. The duo soon discover a pair of lovelorn spectres living inside the house who are determined to prove how lonely the holidays can be.

Carter based the episode around an idea he and fellow writer Frank Spotnitz had been working on, set in a haunted house. Featuring the smallest cast of an X-Files episode—with only four actors—and a single set, "How the Ghosts Stole Christmas" was the cheapest sixth season episode. The drastic reduction in the budget, however, put more strain on the main actors.

== Plot ==
Dana Scully (Gillian Anderson) reluctantly joins Fox Mulder (David Duchovny) on Christmas Eve to investigate a haunted house in Maryland. Mulder explains that in 1917, a young couple living there made a suicide pact, as each was unwilling to spend the afterlife alone. In the years since, the two are said to have haunted the house, with their spirits usually materializing on Christmas Eve.

Mulder and Scully enter the house, and the two begin to experience strange phenomena. Upstairs, the agents find two corpses that look like themselves, although each has been killed by a gunshot. Mulder and Scully split up, hoping to find a way out, and while separated, they encounter the mansion's ghosts, Maurice (Ed Asner) and Lyda (Lily Tomlin). Through psychological manipulation, the ghosts turn the agents against each other: Scully appears to encounter Mulder, who shoots her, while Mulder appears to find a wounded Scully, who shoots him. In both cases, Lyda is impersonating the other agent, making each believe they have been shot by the other.

Mulder and Scully eventually meet near the front door, apparently wounded and covered in blood. When the two begin accusing the other of shooting them, Mulder realizes that neither shooting could have happened. This breaks the ghosts' illusion, which allows the agents to leave. Later, Maurice and Lyda sit by the fire and lament how they failed to cause the agents to kill themselves.

== Production ==
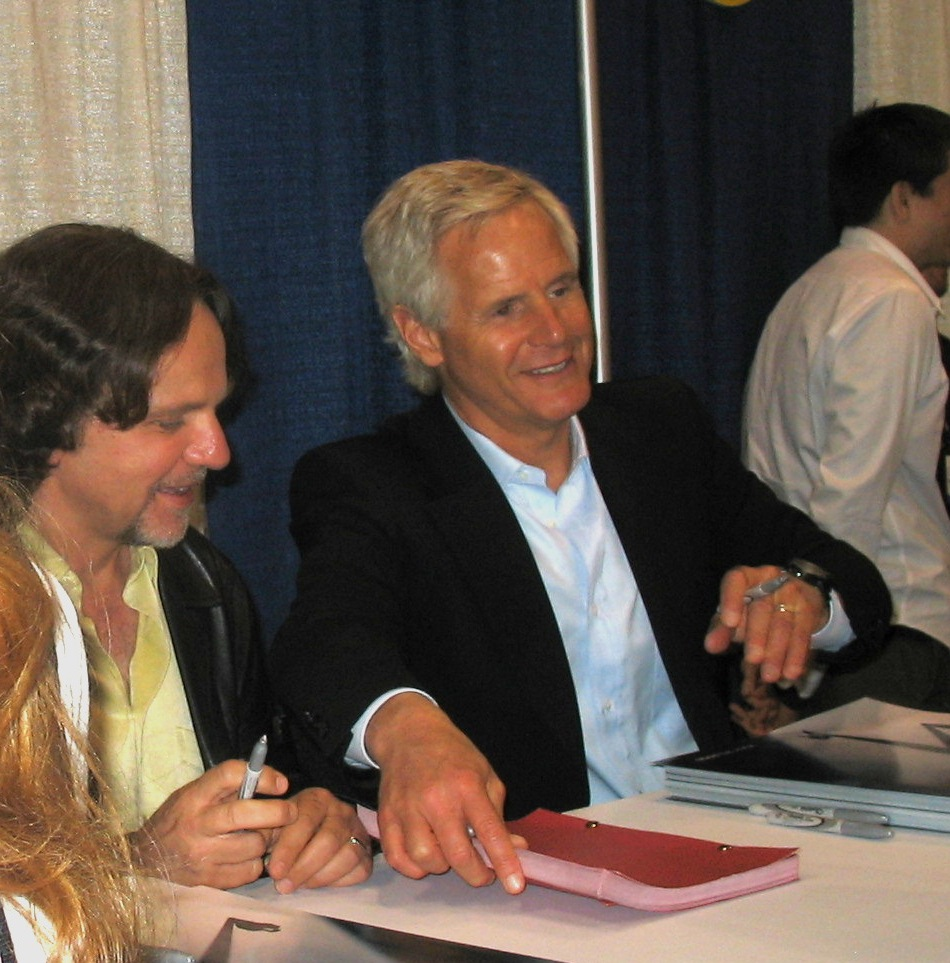
"How the Ghosts Stole Christmas" was based on an idea by Frank Spotnitz (left) and Chris Carter (right) featuring a haunted house.

=== Conception and writing ===
Writer, director, and series creator Chris Carter based "How the Ghosts Stole Christmas" around a story idea he and fellow writer and executive producer Frank Spotnitz had been working on about a haunted house. The only scene that the two had really developed was what would become the climax of the episode: Mulder and Scully pulling themselves across the floor, bleeding profusely. Carter also wanted to keep all the action on a single set, which led to production designer Corey Kaplan proposing that they base it in Scully's apartment—a set that the crew had not used for a while. However, Carter, wanting to keep the haunted house motif, decided to set the episode in a haunted house and asked Kaplan to design a mansion set that was "bleak, but not too bleak [...] decrepit, but not too decrepit," and "deserted, but not too deserted".

=== Casting and filming ===
"How the Ghosts Stole Christmas" featured the smallest cast of any X-Files episode, with only Duchovny, Anderson, and the two guest stars interacting. Lily Tomlin, who played the part of Lyda, had originally approached The X-Files producers several seasons prior and asked to be cast in an episode. Carter agreed to meet her and the two discussed possible ideas for future episodes. Several years later, Carter decided to write "How the Ghosts Stole Christmas" largely as a vehicle for her. Originally, Carter wanted Bob Newhart to play the part of Maurice. However, Newhart was not interested, and so the production team approached Ed Asner, who readily agreed.

The production for the episode was bare-bones, making use of only a few sets. Because of this, "How the Ghosts Stole Christmas" was the cheapest sixth season episode; however, the reduction in the budget made writing and directing the episode a challenge, as Carter was forced to work within tighter production constraints. The outside scenes were filmed in front of the Piru Mansion in Piru, California, where the episode "The Rain King" would later be filmed. The day before filming at the mansion was slated to begin, a fire erupted behind the building. Luckily, after an hour local firemen were able to bring the blaze under control by digging a fire break, with the fire stopping a mere 300 feet (91 m) from the house.

=== Effects and music ===
Special effects editor Bill Millar was tasked with designing the "bloodless bullet holes" that Scully, and later Mulder, discover on Maurice and Lyda. To create this effect, Millar attached fluorescent cloth to the places that would become the bullet wounds. An ultraviolet light was then added to the set lighting, "invisibly reflect[ing]" the ultraviolet light, which Millar used as tracking data. The cloth was then removed during post-production and computer-generated bullet wounds were pasted in their place. Millar admits that the technique was borrowed from the 1992 movie Death Becomes Her, although he sarcastically admitted that, "we did it better and with less money." Anderson was later critical of the fake blood used for the episode because the sheer quantity quickly coagulated and formed a "gummy mess".

Mark Snow, the composer for the episode, admitted to "ripping off" Joseph Haydn's "Toy" Symphony to create the eerie Baroque-inspired harpsichord score. Snow also admits that another major influence for the episode was Johnny Mandel's "brilliant" score for the film Deathtrap (1982).

== Broadcast and reception ==
"How the Ghosts Stole Christmas" first aired in the United States on December 13, 1998. This episode earned a Nielsen rating of 10.6, with a 16 share, meaning that roughly 10.6 percent of all television-equipped households, and 16 percent of households watching television, were tuned in to the episode. It was viewed by 17.30 million viewers. The episode aired in the United Kingdom and Ireland on Sky1 on April 11, 1999 and received 0.70 million viewers and was the fourth most watched episode that week. Corey Kaplan later won an award of excellence from the Society of Motion Picture and Television Art Directors for his work on "How the Ghosts Stole Christmas."

The episode received mostly positive reviews from critics, with some detractors. Sight on Sound called the episode "one of the best Christmas episodes of any series." The review called “How the Ghosts Stole Christmas,” "an extremely creative, arguably bitter Holiday treat, perfect for [Christmas] with its blend of horror, comedy and hints of romance." Static Mass writer Patrick Samuel awarded the episode five stars and said, "As [Mulder and Scully] gleefully unwrap their presents at the end, this episode is something that really makes my own Christmases feel that little bit more complete." Den of Geek writer Juliette Harrisson, in a review of "Monday," said, "Season six included some more excellent episodes [and] classic comedy episodes including, "How The Ghosts Stole Christmas." DVD.net called "How the Ghosts Stole Christmas" a "classic" standalone episode. SFX named the episode the sixth best "SF [Sci-Fi] & Fantasy Christmas Episodes" and noted that it was full of "classic lines, some neat tricks".

Zack Handlen from The A.V. Club gave the episode a largely positive review and awarded it a grade of an A. He noted that the episode was written in a similar manner to the earlier, Carter-penned "The Post-Modern Prometheus". Handlen wrote that both entries "have a gleeful, everybody-gets-out-okay-in-the-end vibe". He, however, concluded that the "episode lives and dies on the strength of its two guest stars" before writing that "Asner and Tomlin are more than up to the task." Earl Cressey from DVD Talk called "How the Ghosts Stole Christmas" one of the "highlights of season six." Robert Shearman, in his book Wanting to Believe: A Critical Guide to The X-Files, Millennium & The Lone Gunmen, rated the episode five stars out of five. Tom Kessenich, in his book Examination: An Unauthorized Look at Seasons 6–9 of the X-Files gave the episode more of a mixed to positive review, noting the lack of darkness in the episode. He wrote, "OK, I liked a lot of this episode. […] But while I've enjoyed the sheer entertainment value of the past three shows, I really am longing for something a bit sinister and darker."

Not all reviews were so positive. Paula Vitaris from Cinefantastique gave the episode a largely negative review and awarded it one-and-a-half stars out of four. Vitaris was unhappy with the way Maurice and Lyda were characterized, noting that their method of trying to get Mulder and Scully to kill each other resulted in "endless psychobabble dialogue". Michigan Daily writer Melissa Runstrom, in a review of the sixth season, described "How the Ghosts Stole Christmas" as "hokey" and "over-the-top." She identified it as the weakest episode of the sixth season.

== Bibliography ==
- Kessenich, Tom (2002). Examination: An Unauthorized Look at Seasons 6–9 of the X-Files. Trafford Publishing. ISBN 1-55369-812-6.
- Meisler, Andy (2000). The End and the Beginning: The Official Guide to the X-Files Volume 5. Harper Prism. ISBN 0-06-107595-7.
- Shearman, Robert (2009). Wanting to Believe: A Critical Guide to The X-Files, Millennium & The Lone Gunmen. Mad Norwegian Press. ISBN 978-0-9759446-9-1.
