= Don Heater =

American football player (born 1950)

No. 34
- Position: Running back

Personal information
- Born: June 22, 1950 (age 76); Helena, Montana, U.S.
- Listed height: 6 ft 2 in (1.88 m)
- Listed weight: 205 lb (93 kg)

Career information
- High school: Thompson Falls (MT)
- College: Montana Tech
- NFL draft: 1972: 6th round, 135th overall pick

Career history
- St. Louis Cardinals (1972); Green Bay Packers (1972)*
- * Offseason or practice squad member only
- Stats at Pro Football Reference

Donald Perry Heater (born June 22, 1950) is an American former football running back who played for St. Louis Cardinals of the National Football League (NFL).

Heater played college football for the Montana Tech Oredigger, where he set three NAIA records and 14 school records, and was named to the NAIA All-America team twice, as a junior and as a senior. He ended his college career with more rushing yards than any other Montana collegiate, with over 4,000 yards. His NAIA records set in 1971 included most rushes in a season (319) and most rushing yards in season (1,797). The New York Times wrote a story about Heater on October 31, 1971, during his senior year, stating that some scouts rated him higher than Cornell running back Ed Marinaro, who later played for the Minnesota Vikings.

Heater was selected by the Cardinals in the 6th round of the 1972 NFL draft with the 135th overall selection. He was waived by the Cardinals before the start of the 1972 regular season. He was signed by the Green Bay Packers, who waived him before he played any games for them. The Cardinals then resigned him and he played two games for the Cardinals before being waived again, after the Cardinals acquired running backs Cannonball Butler and Tom Woodeshick. He played in the Cardinals first two games of the 1972 season on September 17 and 24, against the Baltimore Colts and Washington Redskins, respectively. He then completed his degree in mining engineering at Montana Tech. In late 1972 he received an invitation to tryout with the Dallas Cowboys in February 1973 but he was cut before training camp.

Heater may have been partially responsible for defensive end Lyle Alzado being drafted by the NFL. In 1970, Denver Broncos' coach Stan Jones had car trouble in Butte, Montana and stopped by Montana Tech while waiting for his car to be repaired. Heater's coach showed Jones films of Heater playing in a game against Alzado's school, Yankton College. Jones was so impressed with Alzado on the films that Denver drafted him in the 1971 NFL draft.
