= Sundown: The Vampire in Retreat =

1989 film

- Theatrical release poster
- Directed by: Anthony Hickox
- Written by: John Burgess; Anthony Hickox
- Produced by: Jefferson Richard
- Starring: David Carradine; Maxwell Caulfield; Morgan Brittany; Bruce Campbell; Jim Metzler; John Ireland; Deborah Foreman; M. Emmet Walsh
- Cinematography: Levie Isaacks
- Edited by: Christopher Cibelli
- Music by: Richard Stone
- Production company: Vestron Pictures
- Distributed by: Vestron Pictures
- Release dates: May 11, 1989 (Cannes Film Festival); October 23, 1991 (United States)
- Running time: 104 minutes
- Country: United States
- Language: English
- Budget: $2.8 million

Sundown: The Vampire in Retreat is a 1989 American Western comedy horror film directed by Anthony Hickox and starring David Carradine, Bruce Campbell, Morgan Brittany, and Deborah Foreman. It was written by Hickox and John Burgess.

Its only public screenings were at film festivals in Seattle and Palm Springs, as well as at Cannes. Released in 1991 on VHS and in 2008 on DVD, it has earned a cult following.

== Plot ==
Under the leadership of the ancient Jozek Mardulak, a colony of vampires seeks a peaceful life in the desolate desert town of Purgatory; key to the transition is repairing the town's artificial blood factory. Mardulak summons the human designer of the plant, David Harrison, who brings his wife and two young daughters along for what he thinks will be a pleasant desert vacation.

Ethan Jefferson is a vampire who wants to return to hunting and feasting on humans. Soon, the plant manager and his family are caught up in a civil war, as Jefferson organizes a revolution.

In the midst of the vampire civil war, a young descendant of the Van Helsing family arrives intent on destroying all vampires.

== Cast ==
- David Carradine as Count Jozek Mardulak
- Bruce Campbell as Robert Van Helsing
- Morgan Brittany as Sarah Harrison
- Jim Metzler as David Harrison
- Maxwell Caulfield as Shane Dennis
- Deborah Foreman as Sandy White
- M. Emmet Walsh as Mort Bisby
- John Ireland as Ethan Jefferson
- Dana Ashbrook as Jack
- John Hancock as Quinton Canada
- Marion Eaton as Anna Trotsberg
- Dabbs Greer as Otto Trotsberg
- Bert Remsen as Milt Bisby
- Sunshine Parker as Merle Bisby
- Helena Carroll as Madge
- Elizabeth Gracen as Alice
- Christopher Bradley as Chaz
- Kathy MacQuarrie Martin as Burgundy
- Jack Eiseman as Nigel
- George Buck Flower as Bailey
- Erin Gourlay as Juliet Harrison
- Vanessa Pierson as Gwendolyn Harrison
- Brendan Hughes as James
- Gerardo Mejia as Pucci
- Mike Najiar as Ramon
- Phillip Simon as Pierre

== Production ==
Parts of the film were shot at Moab, Spanish Valley, Thompson Springs, Hittle Bottom and Arches National Park in Utah.

== Reception ==
In Creature Feature, the movie received 3 out of 5 stars, noting that it was infused with cinematic vitality TV Guide similarly gave the movie 3 out of 5 stars, finding the movie to be enjoyable, but that the ending collapses under its own cleverness. Entertainment Weekly gave the movie a C−, finding it to be anemic.
