= Deborah Goodrich =

American novelist

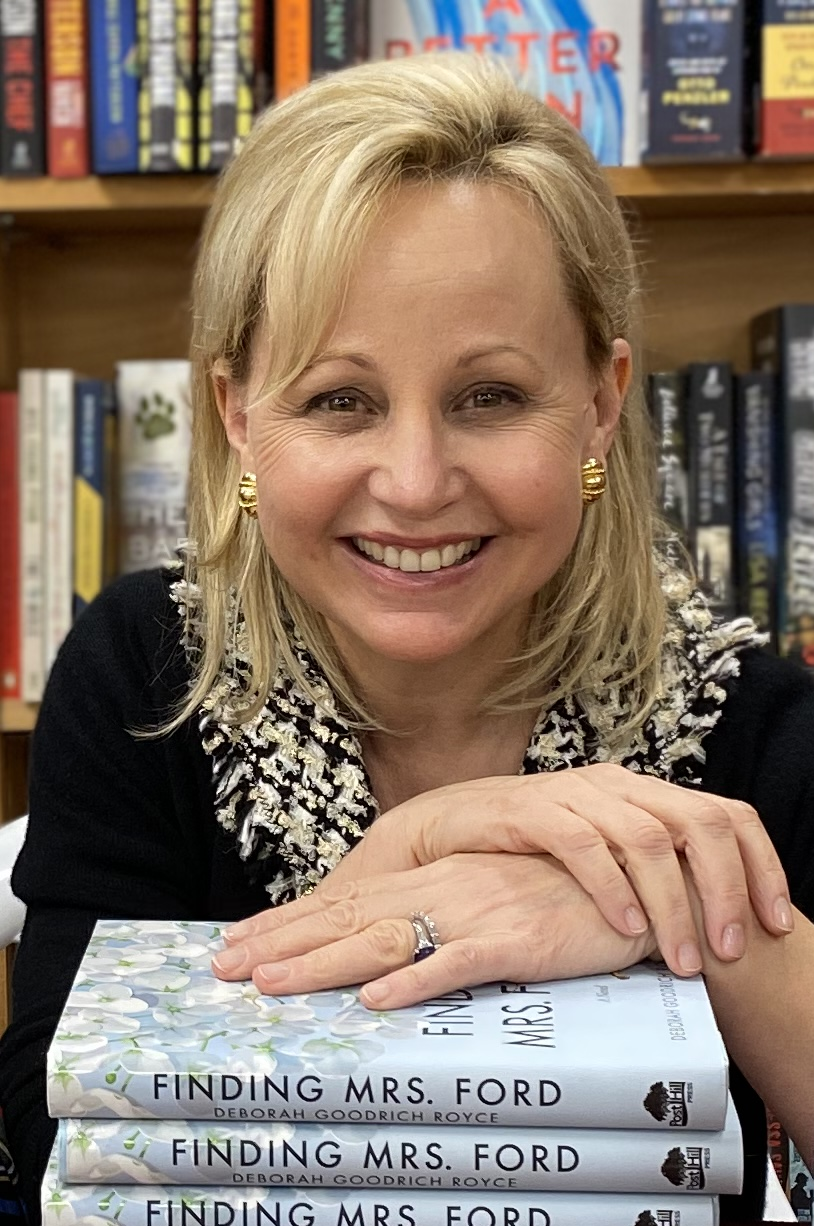
- Goodrich in 2019
- Born: Deborah Goodrich; May 11, 1958 (age 68); Detroit, Michigan, U.S.
- Education: Lake Erie College
- Occupations: Actor, writer
- Years active: 1980–1992 (acting); 2019–present (writing)
- Spouses: Pliny Porter; Charles Royce (m. 2002)
- Children: 2

Deborah Goodrich Royce (née Goodrich; May 11, 1958) is an American former actress, story editor, and author. She is best known for her screen roles in Just One of the Guys (1985) and the horror films April Fool's Day (1986) and Remote Control (1988).

Goodrich published her debut novel, Finding Mrs. Ford, through the Post Hill Press, an imprint of Simon & Schuster, in 2019.

== Biography ==
Goodrich was raised in Warren, Michigan. She graduated summa cum laude from Lake Erie College in Painesville, Ohio in 1980, earning a bachelor's degree in modern foreign languages with a minor in dance. Goodrich started acting in 1980 with the film Those Lips, Those Eyes. Thereafter she played several roles in television series and films such as All My Children (1982–1983) and St. Elsewhere (1986). She stopped acting in 1992 to dedicate herself to her work as a story editor with Miramax.

Goodrich is on the boards of the New York Botanical Garden, the PRASAD Project, the Avon Theatre in Stamford, Connecticut (which she co-founded), and the Greenwich Historical Society. She is on the advisory boards of the American Film Institute, the Greenwich International Film Festival, the Preservation Society of Newport County, and the Preservation Foundation of Palm Beach.

In 2014, she joined the board of the Greenwich International Film Festival.

Her first novel, Finding Mrs. Ford, a literary thriller, will be published on June 25, 2019 by Post Hill Press and distributed by Simon & Schuster.

== Personal life ==
Goodrich is married to Charles Royce. She has two daughters, Alexandra and Tess. She was Julia Roberts' bridesmaid. As of 2019, Goodrich resides in Riverside, Connecticut, where she has been a long-time resident.

== Filmography ==
=== Film ===
Year	Title	Role	Notes	Ref.
1980	Those Lips, Those Eyes	Dancer		
1984	Old Friends	Susan King		
1985	Just One of the Guys	Deborah		
1985	Peyton Place: The Next Generation	Kelly Carson	Television Film	
1986	April Fool's Day	Nikki Beshears		
1986	The Deliberate Stranger	Martha Chambers	Television Mini-Series	
1987	Survival Game	C.J. Forrest		
1988	Remote Control	Belinda Watson		
1988	Liberace	Joanne	Television Film	
1990	Ladies on Sweet Street	Kitty Stone		
1992	Out on a Limb	Jenny		

=== Television ===
Year	Title	Role	Notes	Ref.
1982–1983	All My Children	Silver Kane		
1984	The Edge of Night	Hollace Dineen #1		
1984	The New Mike Hammer	Marilyn		
1984	Three's a Crowd	Sue		
1985	Hotel	Lisa Herrick		
1985	The A-Team	Jenny Corson		
1985	Double Dare	Gloria		
1986	St. Elsewhere	Sarah Preston		
1988	21 Jump Street	Grace		
1989	Day by Day	Sheila Fein		
1990	Alien Nation	Virginia Hamm		
1991	Beverly Hills 90210	Sandy		

== Bibliography ==
- Goodrich Royce, Deborah (2019). Finding Mrs. Ford. New York: Post Hill Press. ISBN 978-1-642-93172-3.
- Goodrich Royce, Deborah (2021). Ruby Falls. New York: Post Hill Press. ISBN 978-1-642-93709-1.
- Goodrich Royce, Deborah (2023). Reef Road. New York: Post Hill Press. ISBN 978-1-637-58496-5.
