= S.R. 819 =

- The X-Files episode
- Walter Skinner lies in a hospital bed, dying from a nanobot infection. Mitch Pileggi had to endure long bouts of make-up application, a process he reportedly hated.
- Episode no.: Season 6 Episode 9
- Directed by: Daniel Sackheim
- Written by: John Shiban
- Production code: 6ABX10
- Original air date: January 17, 1999
- Running time: 45 minutes

Guest appearances
- Mitch Pileggi as Assistant Director Walter Skinner; Nicholas Lea as Alex Krycek; Kenneth Tigar as Dr. Plant; Jenny Gago as Dr. Katrina Cabrera; John Towey as Dr. Kenneth Orgel; Raymond J. Barry as Senator Richard Matheson; Arlene Pileggi as Skinner's Assistant

Episode chronology
← Previous "The Rain King"	Next → "Tithonus"
- The X-Files season 6

"S.R. 819" is the ninth episode of the sixth season of the science fiction television series The X-Files. It premiered on the Fox network on January 17, 1999, in the United States. The episode was written by John Shiban, and directed by Daniel Sackheim. The episode helps to explore the series' overarching mythology. "S.R. 819" earned a Nielsen household rating of 9.1, being watched by 15.7 million people in its initial broadcast. The episode received mixed to positive reviews from critics.

The show centers on Federal Bureau of Investigation (FBI) special agents Fox Mulder (David Duchovny) and Dana Scully (Gillian Anderson) who work on cases linked to the paranormal, called X-Files. Mulder is a believer in the paranormal, while the skeptical Scully has been assigned to debunk his work. In the episode, Mulder and Scully have 24 hours to save Assistant Director Skinner (Mitch Pileggi) from a biologically engineered disease. In order to combat the disease, Scully looks for a medical answer, while Mulder searches for the culprits behind the attack on Skinner's life. To aid him in this task, Mulder visits Senator Matheson, whom he hopes can help him find who is responsible before time runs out.

Before the writing of "S.R. 819", the writers for The X-Files felt that the character of Walter Skinner was becoming too "expendable". John Shiban, the writer of the episode, decided to re-work Skinner back into the series' mythology by crafting the episode around him. Mitch Pileggi had to endure long bouts of make-up application, a process that he admitted he "hated". The nanobots in the blood sample were designed on a computer and then rendered for the final footage.

== Plot ==
The episode opens with Assistant Director Walter Skinner (Mitch Pileggi) hospitalized with severely discolored, pulsating veins. He suddenly goes into cardiac arrest and is pronounced dead. The episode then jumps twenty-four hours earlier: Skinner is shown experiencing a dizzy spell while boxing and receives a call from a computerized voice telling him that he has twenty-four hours to live. Fox Mulder (David Duchovny) and Dana Scully (Gillian Anderson) notice a bruise on his ribs rapidly growing. Reviewing FBI security footage, Scully identifies physicist Dr. Kenneth Orgel, an adviser to a Senate subcommittee on ethics and new technology, who had approached Skinner earlier that day. Mulder and Skinner go to Orgel's house and discover that he is being held hostage. Though Mulder arrests the kidnapper, he is released because he has diplomatic immunity.

Scully examines Skinner's blood and discovers some form of multiplying carbon nanotechnology. Mulder learns that Skinner was investigating a health funding bill called S.R. 819 and begins pursuing a suspicious bearded man who has been following Skinner and sending him threatening messages. Skinner realizes that he has seen the same man at his boxing club, the FBI, and the hospital. Meanwhile, Senator Richard Matheson (Raymond J. Barry) finds Orgel suffering from the same condition as Skinner at an abandoned power plant. Before Matheson can free him, the bearded man remotely activates the nanotechnology, killing Orgel. Skinner likewise goes into cardiac arrest at the hospital but suddenly revives when the man deactivates the nanotechnology.

Afterward, Skinner appears healthy and closes the case, ordering Mulder and Scully to report exclusively to Assistant Director Alvin Kersh. The bearded man then confronts Skinner and reveals himself to be Alex Krycek (Nicholas Lea), who still controls the nanotechnology inside Skinner's body and can use it to incapacitate or kill him.

== Production ==
=== Writing ===
At the start of season six, the producers of The X-Files began to worry that Walter Skinner was becoming "expendable", as Mulder and Scully's transfer from the X-Files division meant that they saw less and less of him. Originally, John Shiban, the writer of the episode, wanted to infect Mulder with nanobots. However, he decided that since the audience knew Mulder would not be killed, this plot would not be very effective. Shiban thus decided to re-work Skinner back into the series mythology by putting him in Mulder's place. Shiban, inspired by the noir film D.O.A. (1950) and its 1988 remake—which he jokingly called "[two] pretty bad movies"—decided to craft an episode of The X-Files around the concept of "a guy who's been poisoned [and] has only a short time to live and has to use that time to find out why and by whom he's being murdered".

Shiban began crafting his story by incorporating a nanobot plot that had been considered by various writers for several seasons. Shiban and the rest of the writing room were conscious in their decision to give Alex Krycek full control over Skinner via the nanobot infection, as it caused Skinner to once again become a mysterious character whose true loyalties could be tested. Shiban noted that, "[Krycek's control] gives Skinner an agenda that Mulder doesn't know about [...] Which was something we ultimately used again in the seasonender [sic], and will carry us into next year".

=== Filming and effects ===
Originally, the episode was slated to feature a "time-consuming" fight scene pitting Skinner against Krycek, but the scene was cut because of time-constraints and worries about going over-budget. However, Skinner's boxing match proved much "eas[ier] to stage". Mitch Pileggi had boxed competitively in college and went for "refresher course[s]" at the Goosen Gym in Los Angeles to prep for the episode. He later remarked, "It makes me happy that some people will assume there was a stunt double in the ring. There wasn't! [...] We both had a pretty good time". Location manager Ilt Jones called "S.R. 819" the "damn parking lot episode" because he was personally tasked with finding the variety of parking lots used in the episode. He later joked, "I started to wake up screaming about barriers and parking tickets and entrances and exit ramps".

Pileggi had to endure long hours of makeup application, and to create the principal illusion of monstrous veins, long black faux-veins were glued to his body. Pileggi had had little to no makeup in previous episodes and later said, "They did a beautiful job and [the veins] looked awesome, but man, I hated it! I really don't know how those guys on Star Trek or Babylon 5 can stand having that done to them every day. I just wouldn't work if that's what it took". To show the nanobot infection progressing, special effects makeup supervisor John Vulich used two different makeup sets: one representing the early stage of the disease, and the other representing the later stage. The nanobots in the blood sample were designed on a computer and then cloned with an animation program.

== Broadcast and reception ==
"S.R. 819" first aired in the United States on January 17, 1999. This episode earned a Nielsen rating of 9.1, meaning that roughly 9.1 percent of all television-equipped households were tuned in to the episode. It was viewed by 15.7 million viewers. The episode aired in the United Kingdom and Ireland on Sky1 on May 2, 1999, and received 690,000 viewers, making it the second most watched episode that week. The episode was nominated for three 2000 Emmy Awards by the Academy of Television Arts & Sciences for Outstanding Music Composition for a Series (Dramatic Underscore). The episode was later included on The X-Files Mythology, Volume 3 – Colonization, a DVD collection that contains episodes involved with the alien Colonist's plans to take over the earth.

The episode was met with mixed to positive reviews from critics. Tom Kessenich, in his book Examination: An Unauthorized Look at Seasons 6–9 of the X-Files wrote positively of the episode, saying, "'S.R. 819' re-established some wonderful conspiracy overtones and perhaps set the stage for more interesting developments in the future. It touched base with the very roots The X-Files sprung out of and did so in strong fashion." Emily St. James of The A.V. Club gave the episode a moderately positive review and awarded it a "B". She enjoyed the plot, calling it "fun", praised the twist ending, and called the nanobot makeup effects "legitimately terrifying". She did, however, write critically of Skinner's role in the episode, noting that his lack of presence made the entry a "disappointing one". In addition, St. James criticized the fact that the teaser shows Skinner dying; she wrote that "[t]here’s very little gas in the idea of Skinner dying" and that most of the viewers knew he would not die.

Paula Vitaris from Cinefantastique gave the episode a mixed review and awarded it two stars out of four. Vitaris cited severe problems with "Skinner's emotional journey" as the main detractors for the episode. Robert Shearman, on the other hand, awarded the episode two out of five stars in his book Wanting to Believe: A Critical Guide to The X-Files, Millennium & The Lone Gunmen. Despite writing positively of the "traditional X-File" feel, Shearman called the episode "a return to the sort of murky storylining which promises so much but delivers so little".

== Bibliography ==
- Hurwitz, Matt; Knowles, Chris (2008). The Complete X-Files. Insight Editions. ISBN 978-1-933784-80-9.
- Kessenich, Tom (2002). Examination: An Unauthorized Look at Seasons 6–9 of the X-Files. Trafford Publishing. ISBN 1-55369-812-6.
- Meisler, Andy (2000). The End and the Beginning: The Official Guide to the X-Files Season 6. HarperCollins. ISBN 0-06-107595-7.
- Shearman, Robert (2009). Wanting to Believe: A Critical Guide to The X-Files, Millennium & The Lone Gunmen. Mad Norwegian Press. ISBN 978-0-9759446-9-1.
