= Lyle Alzado =

American football player & actor (1949–1992)

No. 77
- Position: Defensive end

Personal information
- Born: April 3, 1949; Brooklyn, New York, U.S.
- Died: May 14, 1992 (aged 43); Portland, Oregon, U.S.
- Listed height: 6 ft 3 in (1.91 m)
- Listed weight: 255 lb (116 kg)

Career information
- High school: Lawrence (Cedarhurst, New York)
- College: Yankton
- NFL draft: 1971: 4th round, 79th overall pick

Career history
- Denver Broncos (1971–1978); Cleveland Browns (1979–1981); Los Angeles Raiders (1982–1985); Los Angeles Raiders (1990)*
- * Offseason or practice squad member only

Awards and highlights
- Super Bowl champion (XVIII); NFL Comeback Player of the Year (1982); 2× First-team All-Pro (1977, 1980); Second-team All-Pro (1978); 2× Pro Bowl (1977, 1978)

Career NFL statistics
- Sacks: 112
- Fumble recoveries: 20
- Safeties: 3
- Defensive touchdowns: 1
- Stats at Pro Football Reference

Lyle Martin Alzado (April 3, 1949 – May 14, 1992) was an American professional football player who was a defensive end of the National Football League (NFL), famous for his intense and intimidating style of play.

Alzado played for the Denver Broncos, the Cleveland Browns, and finally the Los Angeles Raiders with whom he won a championship in Super Bowl XVIII. He was a three-time All-Pro and two-time Pro Bowl selection during his career of 15 years.

== Early life ==
Alzado was born in Brownsville, Brooklyn, New York to an Italian-Spanish father, Maurice, and a Jewish mother with a Russian family background, Martha Sokolow Alzado. He followed Judaism. When he was 10, the family moved to Cedarhurst, Long Island. His father, whom Alzado later described as "a drinker and street fighter," left the family during Alzado's sophomore year at Lawrence High School. He played high school football under coach Richard Mollo for three years.

== College career ==
After he did not receive a college scholarship offer, Alzado played for Kilgore College, a community college in Kilgore, Texas. Two years after joining he was asked to leave the team; he later said it was for befriending a black teammate. He went to play for Yankton College in South Dakota. Though playing in relative obscurity in the NAIA, Alzado nonetheless gained notice by the NFL when Denver Broncos' coach and scout Stan Jones having been taken off the road by automobile trouble, decided to pass the time at nearby Montana Tech, one of Yankton's opponents. Montana Tech's coaches were showing him films of their star running back Don Heater, but Jones was impressed with the unknown defensive lineman Alzado squaring off against Montana Tech's offense and passed back a favorable report to his team. The Broncos ultimately drafted Alzado 79th overall in the fourth round of the 1971 draft. Alzado went back to Yankton after his rookie season to get his college degree. He received a B.A. in physical education with an emphasis in secondary education. During his college years, Alzado participated in amateur boxing making it to the semi-finals of the 1969 Midwest Golden Gloves Boxing Tournament, held in Omaha.

== NFL career ==
=== Denver Broncos ===
When the Broncos' starting right defensive end Rich "Tombstone" Jackson was injured in 1971, Alzado took over the job and went on to make various All-rookie teams for his contributions of 60 tackles and 8 sacks. The following year, Alzado began to get national attention as he racked up 10½ sacks to go with his 91 tackles. In 1973, Alzado posted excellent numbers as the Broncos had a winning record for the first time in team history with a 7–5–2 mark.

In 1974, Alzado gained more notice as one publication named him All-AFC; with his 13 sacks and 80 tackles (eight for a loss), he was recognized as one of the NFL's top defensive ends, along with Elvin Bethea, Jack Youngblood, L. C. Greenwood, Claude Humphrey, and Carl Eller. Bethea, Youngblood, Humphrey, and Eller are enshrined in the Pro Football Hall of Fame. The Denver Broncos posted their second consecutive winning season, going 7–6–1.

The 1975 season brought change, as Alzado moved to defensive tackle. He responded with 91 tackles and 7 sacks. Alzado took a step backward as did the Broncos with a 6–8 record. On the first play of the 1976 season, Alzado blew out a knee and missed that campaign. The Broncos were 9–5 but SPORT magazine reported that 12 players, including Alzado, did not think the team could reach the playoffs with coach John Ralston. Ralston was replaced as coach by Red Miller for the 1977 season.

The 1977 season was the most successful in franchise history to that point; the Broncos had one of the NFL's best defenses, went 12–2 and then beat the Pittsburgh Steelers and Oakland Raiders - the team for which he later starred upon their move to Los Angeles in 1982 - in the playoffs to reach Super Bowl XII. In that game, played in New Orleans, they were beaten soundly 27–10 by the Dallas Cowboys. Still the year was a big success for Alzado, who was voted consensus All-Pro and consensus All-AFC as well as winning the UPI AFC Defensive Player of the Year. He also led the Broncos in sacks with 8, while making 80 tackles.

In 1978, the Broncos again went to the AFC playoffs, but lost the rematch in the first round to the eventual champion Pittsburgh Steelers. Alzado had 77 tackles and 9 sacks and recorded his first NFL safety. (Alzado recorded two more in his career, which ties him for second place all-time). He was 2nd team All-Pro and a consensus All-AFC pick. In 1979, he had a contract dispute, and the Broncos traded him to the Cleveland Browns.

=== Cleveland Browns ===
Alzado made the second-team All-AFC in 1979 playing defensive end. He had 80 tackles that year as well as seven sacks. The following year, the Browns won the AFC Central division, losing to the Raiders in the Divisional round. Alzado led the Browns in sacks with nine, and was All-Pro and All-AFC. In 1981 he recorded 83 tackles and led the Browns in sacks with 8½. However, the Browns, falling from 11–5 in 1980 to 5–11 in 1981, traded him to the Oakland Raiders in 1982.

=== Los Angeles Raiders ===
After the Browns traded Alzado he committed to a heavy workout regimen. By the time he joined the Raiders the team had relocated to Los Angeles. After demonstrating dominant play throughout the strike-shortened 9-game season of 1982, he was voted the NFL Comeback Player of the Year. He also recorded 7 sacks and 30 tackles while being voted All-AFC. That was the sixth season out of his first 12 campaigns that he received a post-season honor.

Alzado helped lead them to a Super Bowl victory in the 1983 season while recording 50 tackles and 7½ sacks. He started at right end opposite future Hall of Fame inductee Howie Long. Alzado also had an outstanding 1984 season with 63 tackles and 6 sacks, but the next year his tackle and sack totals dipped to 31 and 3 following a mid-season injury.

Alzado retired at the end of the 1985 season. He attempted a comeback in 1990, but injured a knee during training camp and was released. In 196 career games, he racked up 112 sacks, 24 forced fumbles, and nearly 1,000 tackles, while earning Pro Bowl honors in 1977 and 1978. After his retirement from playing, Alzado worked as a part-time color analyst for NBC's NFL coverage in 1988–89.

In 2018, the Professional Football Researchers Association named Alzado to the PFRA Hall of Very Good Class of 2018.

== Style of play ==
The man ESPN later labeled a "...violent, combative player known for his short temper", inspired the league rule against throwing a helmet after having done so to an opponent's helmet. Peter Alzado, Lyle's brother, later identified the years of their youth – marked by an absent, alcoholic father and an overworked mother - as the crucible for Alzado's unremittingly fierce style of play. "That violence that you saw on the field was not real stuff," his brother held. "Lyle used football as a way of expressing his anger at the world and at the way he grew up." Defensive end Greg Townsend, a teammate on the Raiders said that the savagery for which Alzado became noted represented part of a "split personality." "Off the field," remembered Townsend, "he was the gentle giant: so caring, so warm, so giving."

== Outside football ==
Alzado was an amateur boxer and, in 1979, fought an exhibition match against Muhammad Ali.

He was involved in "countless youth organizations", receiving the Byron "Whizzer" White award for community service in 1977. He appeared in Stop the Madness, a 1985 anti-drug music video sponsored by the Reagan administration.

== Acting ==
Alzado pursued an acting career in both movies and television, appearing mostly in youth-oriented comedy and adventure roles. His most notable film roles include the bully construction worker in Ernest Goes to Camp and the unstoppable killer in Destroyer. He appeared in Mike Hammer: Murder Takes All as a notorious bodyguard and rifleman. He played prison staff member Brawn in the 1990 film Club Fed and co-starred in the films Neon City and Oceans of Fire.

On television, Alzado appeared in a number of mid-1980s commercials for Sports Illustrated with "Jack", who tries to help him perform the commercial correctly. He played himself, wearing his Raiders uniform, in the Amazing Stories episode "Remote Control Man". He also played himself in a 1988 episode of Small Wonder; he made a guest appearance on The Super Mario Bros. Super Show in 1989. He starred in the sitcom Learning the Ropes as a high school teacher whose secret alter ego is a professional wrestler known as "the Masked Maniac," alongside numerous NWA Wrestling stars. Alzado appeared in the series premiere of the short-lived 1991 sitcom Good Sports with Ryan O'Neal and Farrah Fawcett, and in episodes of It's Garry Shandling's Show and MacGyver.

== Steroid use and death ==
Alzado was one of the first major US sports figures to admit to using anabolic steroids. In the last year of his life, as he battled against the brain tumor which eventually caused his death, Alzado asserted that his steroid abuse directly led to his fatal illness. Alzado recounted his steroid abuse in an article in Sports Illustrated,

I started taking anabolic steroids in 1969 and never stopped... Now I'm sick, and I'm scared... It was addicting, mentally addicting. Ninety percent of the athletes I know are on the stuff. We're not born to be...300 pounds [140 kg] or jump 30 feet [9.1 m]... I became very violent on the field. Off it, too. I did things only crazy people do. Once in 1979, in Denver, a guy side-swiped my car, and I chased him up and down hills through the neighborhoods. I did that a lot. I'd chase a guy, pull him out of his car, beat the hell out of him... But look at me now. I wobble when I walk and sometimes have to hold on to somebody. You have to give me time to answer questions, because I have trouble remembering things.

Alzado died on May 14, 1992, at age 43 from brain cancer. He was buried at River View Cemetery in Portland, Oregon.

== Hall of Fame ==
Alzado was inducted into the International Jewish Sports Hall of Fame in 2008.

== Exhibition boxing record ==
1 fight	0 wins	0 losses
Non-scored	1	

No.	Result	Record	Opponent	Type	Round, time	Date	Location	Notes
1	—N/a	0–0 (1)	(United States) Muhammad Ali	—N/a	8	Jul 14, 1979	(United States) Mile High Stadium, Denver, Colorado, U.S.	Non-scored bout

== See also ==
- List of notable brain tumor patients
- List of doping cases in sport
- List of select Jewish football players
