= Formosa (film) =

2005 American comedy film

- Directed by: Noah Kadner
- Screenplay by: Jamieson Stern
- Produced by: Noah Kadner; Anita M. Cal
- Starring: Jamieson Stern; Jessica Kiper; Steven Gilborn; Clayton Rohner; Cameron Bender; Richard Keith; Saginaw Grant
- Release date: 2005
- Running time: 86 minutes
- Language: English

Formosa (also known as Social Guidance) is a 2005 feature comedy directed by Noah Kadner, written by Jamieson Stern, and produced by Anita M. Cal. The movie starred Geoffrey Lewis and Steven Gilborn. It was filmed in Albuquerque, New Mexico and was distributed internationally on cable. It won the Jury Award for Best Feature - Comedy at the 2005 Garden State Film Festival and was feature at the Sedona Film Festival in Arizona.

== Plot summary ==
Albuquerque, New Mexico, 1951. Sid Silver (Steven Gilborn) has a problem: his social guidance films aren't working anymore. The teens of the '50s are going crazy, and Sid can no longer reach them. Clay Crawford (Jamieson Stern) also has a problem. He's on the run from the law and trying to make it to California to find a man who may be his father. A grizzled bounty hunter named Lucky (Geoffrey Lewis) is hot on Clay's trail. Sid and Clay cross paths in the hot desert winds of New Mexico. Sid's daughter Anne-Marie (Jessica Kiper) begins to fall for Clay to the dismay of her fiancé, Ted (Clayton Rohner) who also bankrolls Sid's films. The fates of Formosa Studios and perhaps New Mexico itself hang in the balance.

== Cast ==
- Geoffrey Lewis as Lucky Marshall
- Jamieson Stern as Clay Crawford
- Jessica Kiper as Anne-Marie Silver
- Steven Gilborn as Sid Silver
- Clayton Rohner as Ted Gregory
- Cameron Bender as Hank Peterson
- Richard Keith as Jimmy McNichol
- Saginaw Grant as Red Hightower
- Erik Holland as Sven Halleus
- Tara Nulty as Virginia Selikovitz
- Laura Nelson (Woodbury)
