= Terms of Endearment (The X-Files) =

- The X-Files episode
- Wayne Weinsider as a demon in his wife's "dream". The scene was shot to give the effect that the fire was mere inches away from the bed.
- Episode no.: Season 6 Episode 7
- Directed by: Rob Bowman
- Written by: David Amann
- Production code: 6ABX06
- Original air date: January 3, 1999
- Running time: 45 minutes

Guest appearances
- Bruce Campbell as Wayne Weinsider; Lisa Jane Persky as Laura Weinsider; Grace Phillips as Betsy Monroe; Chris Owens as Agent Spender; Michael Milhoan as Deputy Arky Stevens; Michael Rothhaar as Dr. Couvillion; Lenora May as Kim Britton; Jimmy Staszkiel as Mr. Ginsberg; Karen Stone as Nurse; Matthew Butcher as EMT

Episode chronology
← Previous "How the Ghosts Stole Christmas"	Next → "The Rain King"
- The X-Files season 6

"Terms of Endearment" is the seventh episode of the sixth season of the American science fiction television series The X-Files, and originally aired on the Fox network on January 3, 1999. Written by David Amann and directed by Rob Bowman, "Terms of Endearment" is a "Monster-of-the-Week" story, unconnected to the series' wider mythology. It earned a Nielsen rating of 10.5 and was watched by 18.7 million people on its initial broadcast. The performance given by guest actor Bruce Campbell attracted positive comments, but the plot was criticized.

The show centers on FBI special agents Fox Mulder (David Duchovny) and Dana Scully (Gillian Anderson) who work on cases linked to the paranormal called X-Files. Mulder is a believer in the paranormal, while the skeptical Scully has been assigned to debunk his work. In the installment, an unborn child is apparently abducted from its mother's womb by a demon after the prospective parents discover that their child has birth defects. After Agent Spender dismisses the assignment as irrelevant to the X-Files, Mulder and Scully steal the case and investigate the creature. While looking into the report, the duo discover that Wayne Weinsider (Campbell) is a child-abducting demon.

"Terms of Endearment", an inversion of the 1968 film Rosemary's Baby, was the first episode written by The X-Files' executive story editor David Amann, a staff member who later became a regular contributor to the series. Campbell, already well known as a cult film actor in several Sam Raimi horror movies, was cast as Wayne Weinsider. Many of the episode's special effects were created without elaborate computer-generated effects. Critics have complimented the episode's unique representation of its antagonist, who has been classified as a sympathetic villain.

== Plot ==
In Hollins, Virginia, Wayne Weinsider (Bruce Campbell) and his pregnant wife Laura (Lisa Jane Persky) learn via an ultrasound scan that their unborn child has bizarre physical abnormalities, such as horn-like protrusions. Wayne appears to be especially distraught after hearing the news. That night, Laura has a terrifying dream in which a demon-like figure snatches the baby from her womb. When she wakes up, the couple discover that Laura has seemingly miscarried.

Laura's brother, who is the local deputy sheriff Arky Stevens, reports her story to the X-Files section at the FBI. Agent Jeffrey Spender (Chris Owens) discards the report, but Mulder (David Duchovny) fishes it out of Spender's shredded paper trash can and then travels to Virginia. After Mulder interviews the Weinsiders, the police, who suspect an illegal abortion according to Scully (Gillian Anderson), search the property. Meanwhile, Wayne tells Laura that he destroyed all the evidence, claiming she aborted the child while in a trance-like state. He convinces Laura that his story is true, but then when the police find remains of the baby in the garden furnace, Laura turns herself in. When Wayne visits Laura in jail, she becomes suspicious of him and is horrified to see a bite wound she delivered to the demon that attacked her on Wayne's neck. To evade detection, Wayne sucks out Laura's soul. An EMT is able to save her life, much to his surprise, although she is comatose.

Mulder discovers that Wayne has another wife, Betsy Monroe, who is also pregnant. A background check finds that Wayne is a Czech immigrant who originally went by the name of Ivan Veles and has been widowed several times. Mulder suspects that Wayne is a demon who is trying to have a normal baby and terminates pregnancies when the fetus exhibits demonic traits. After Betsy tells Wayne that her recent sonogram uncovers some irregularities in the baby's bone structure, Wayne proceeds with his abortion plan. Betsy then has a dream similar to Laura's but recognizes the dream-demon as her husband and confronts him. As Mulder and Scully are driving to Betsy's home, they are met by a distraught and bloody Betsy driving Wayne's car, apparently having just lost her baby. The agents seek out Wayne and catch him digging in Betsy's backyard. Confronted, Wayne claims that he is digging up evidence before he is shot by Stevens. He is taken to the hospital and placed in a bed next to Laura. When Wayne sees her next to him, Wayne opens his mouth and returns her soul to her body, allowing her to recover as he dies.

Mulder and Scully discover the skeletal remains of several human babies in Betsy's yard, none with deformities, leading Mulder to deduce that Betsy is also a demon who is unable to have demonic offspring unless impregnated by another demon. Unlike Wayne, she has been terminating pregnancies that resulted in non-demonic babies – the very kind Wayne has been so desperate to have. As a demon, Betsy recognized Wayne as a male of her kind, which enabled her to stop him from extracting her baby and then frame him for the deaths of the buried babies in her yard. In the final scene, Betsy is seen driving away in Wayne's convertible with a car seat from which a baby's mottled, clawed hand protrudes. She smiles at her child, momentarily revealing her demonic eyes.

== Production ==
=== Background ===
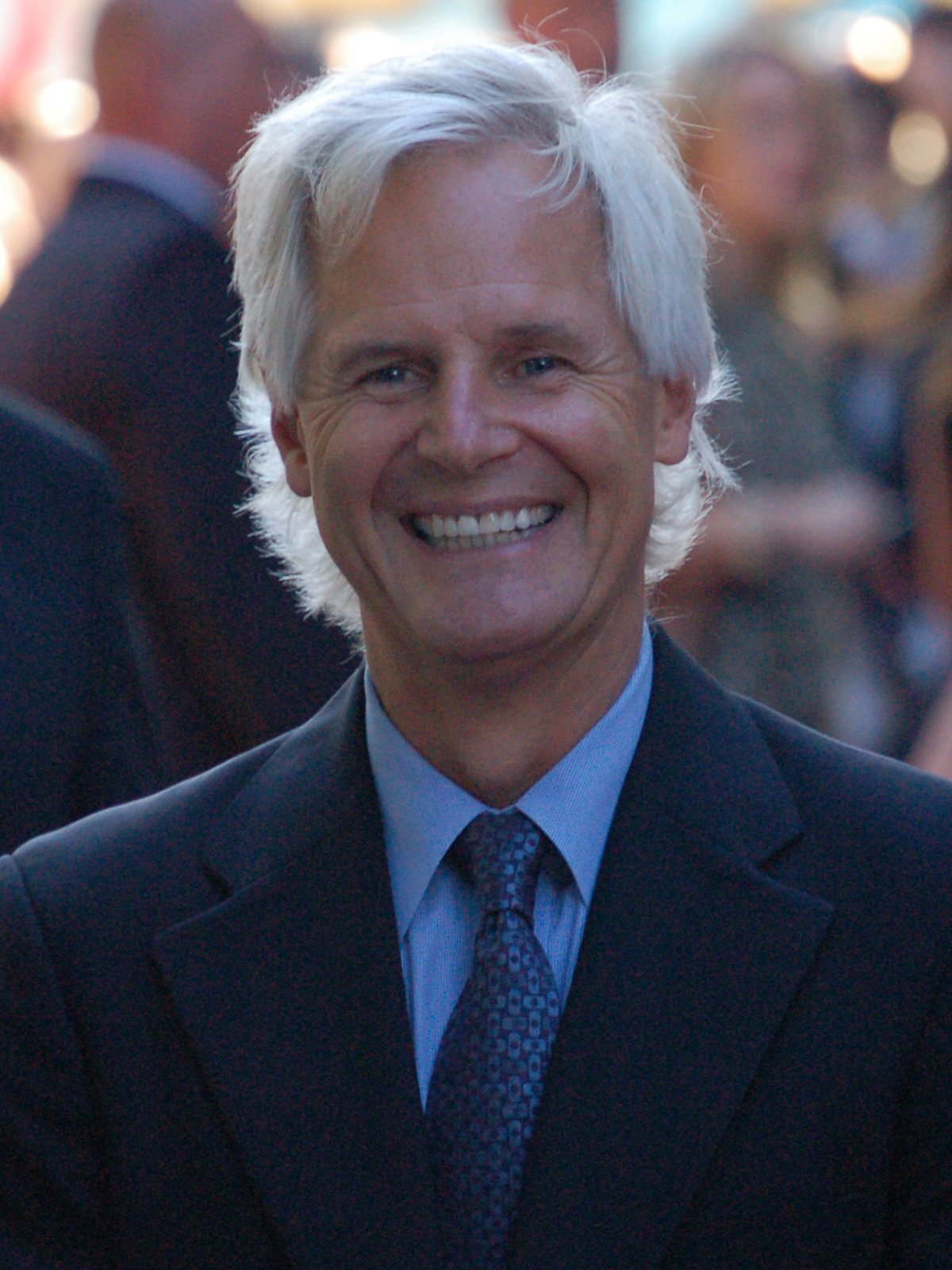
The X-Files creator Chris Carter greenlit the episode, following a pitch provided by David Amann.

"Terms of Endearment" was written by The X-Files executive story editor David Amann, making it his first writing contribution to the series. The concept for "Terms of Endearment" was "about the fifth or sixth idea" Amann came up with for the show. Amann's original idea was to write what he described as "Rosemary's Baby in reverse". He explained, "I had this idea [for doing the episode] not from the point of view of the hapless woman unwittingly impregnated, but from the point of view of the devil". Amann pitched his idea to series creator Chris Carter, who gave him the commission to write the rest of the episode.

According to Amann, the initial draft was "heavier on pure shock value and lighter on humor and human interest". In this version, the demon was shown as removing a serpent from Laura's womb and not a demon baby. In addition, the story unraveled in a more "linear" fashion and showed a demon husband going from human wife to human wife, killing them if unsuccessful in delivering a human baby. The series' regular writers felt that this initial version of the story had a certain "inevitability" to it. Carter suggested that the second woman should be a demon. Amann later admitted that this addition made the story "work well". Kerry Fall from DVD Journal suggested that the plot revolved around "the wives and lives of a demon trying to have a normal child."

The score for "Terms of Endearment" was composed by series regular Mark Snow, who used Gregorian chants to give the atmosphere a "creepy" feel. The 1995 song "Only Happy When It Rains" by alternative rock group Garbage plays several times in the episode, most notably when Betsy Monroe drives away with her demon baby. The quote "Zazas, zazas, nasatanada zazas", supposedly uttered by Laura Weinsider while in trance, is what the occultist Aleister Crowley used to open the 10th Aethyr of the Thelemic demon Choronzon. "Terms of Endearment" is not the first occasion that the series drew influence from Crowley; a high school from the episode "Die Hand Die Verletzt" was named after him as well.

=== Casting ===
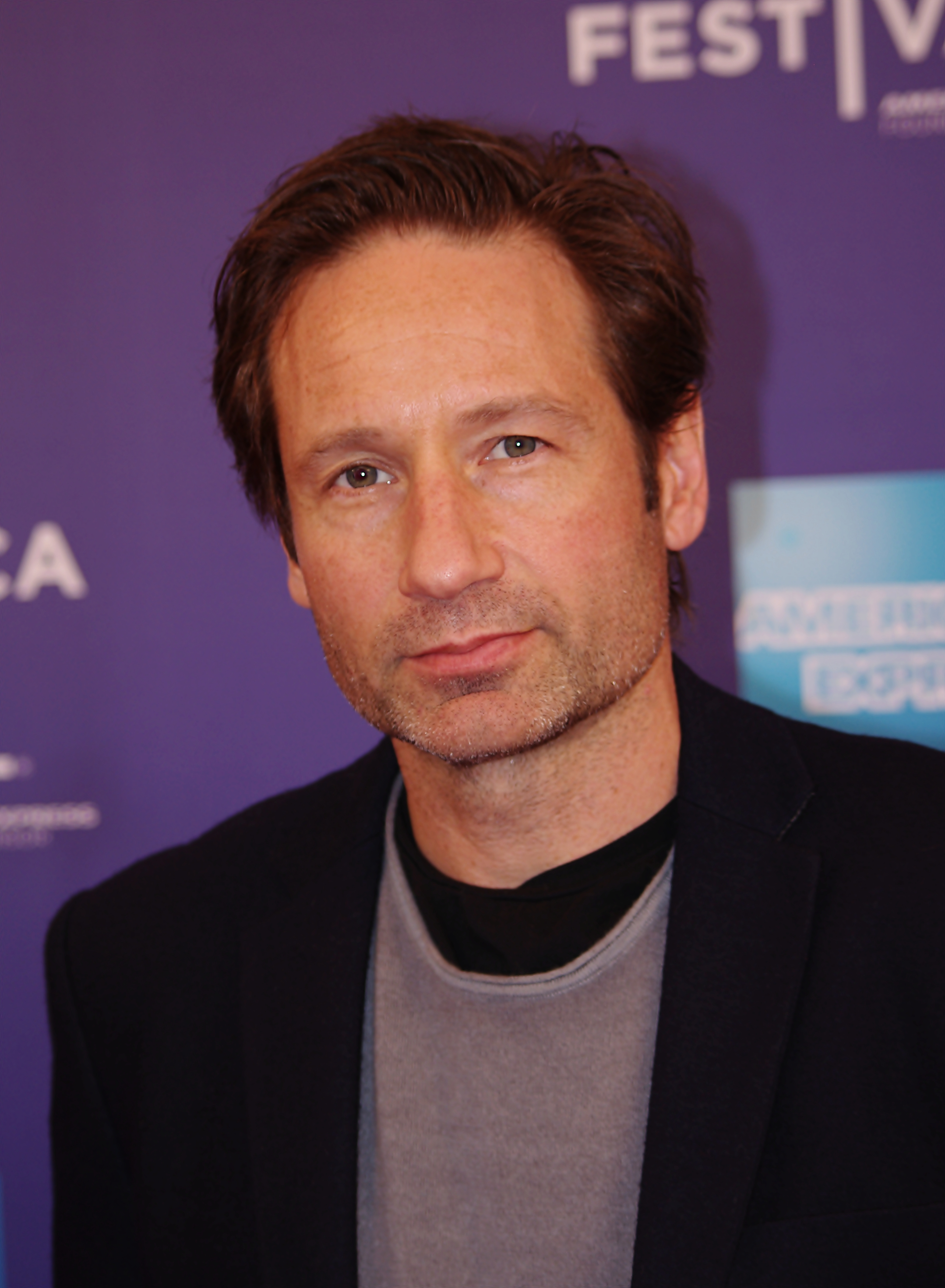
David Duchovny (pictured) entertained himself during production by playing pranks with Bruce Campbell.

Rick Millikan selected Lisa Jane Persky, who was at the top of his casting "wish list", for the role of Laura. In the middle of filming, a cast member withdrew from the production for religious reasons. A mother withdrew her baby from the cast during the final run-through of the "cursed-birth" scene. Although a fan of the show, as a devout Catholic she was uncomfortable with her child representing a demon. Director Rob Bowman was sympathetic to her concerns, and the casting staff was able to find a replacement baby in less than 45 minutes. It was the first time during the filming of the series that a cast member withdrew for religious reasons.

Bruce Campbell, known for taking leading roles in Sam Raimi horror movies such as The Evil Dead trilogy, was cast as the episode's antagonist Wayne Weinsider. Campbell had previously worked for the Fox network on his short-lived series The Adventures of Brisco County, Jr., which began as the lead-in show for The X-Files during the first season. Fox had initially assumed that Brisco County, Jr. was going to be the more successful series, while The X-Files was more unappreciatively referred to as "the other drama Fox ordered that spring". Several of the individuals who worked on the failed Brisco County, Jr. series later found a career working on The X-Files, which led Campbell to call the process a "coming home" experience.

Campbell first met both Duchovny and Anderson during the promotional campaigns for both series in 1993. He commented that, although Duchovny was known for playing a serious role on the show, in real life he was quite a funny person. During shooting, Campbell and Duchovny entertained themselves on set by pranking the crew members, eventually stopping it when crew members became upset. Although Campbell had a positive opinion of working on the show, he commented that the nature of the show did not allow for much improvisation, describing the production as a "well oiled machine".

=== Filming ===
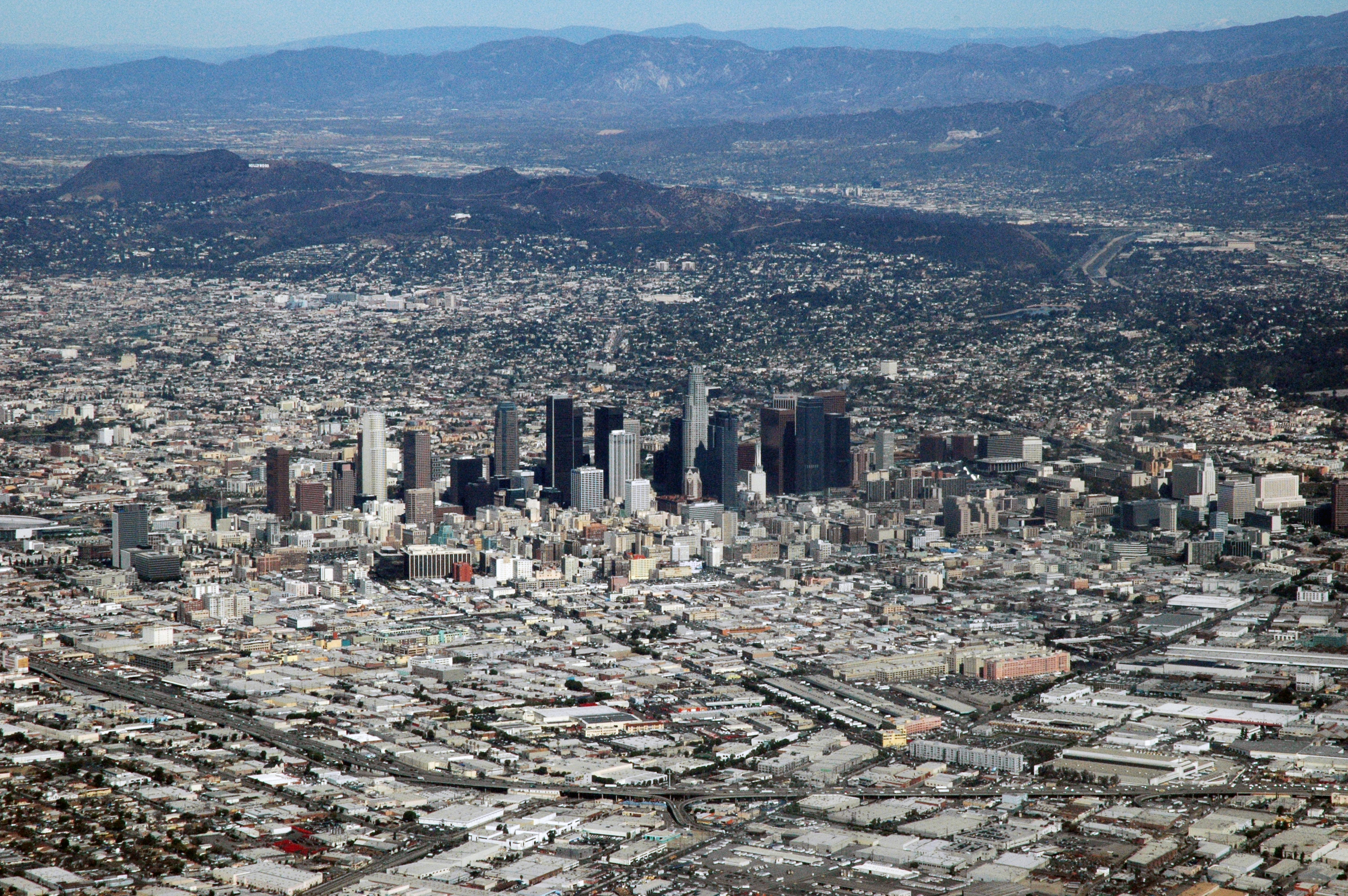
"Terms of Endearment" was filmed in Los Angeles, as were the rest of the episodes of the sixth season.

The first five seasons of the series were mainly filmed in Vancouver, British Columbia, and production of the show's sixth season was based in Los Angeles, California. The principal outdoor filming for "Terms of Endearment" took place around Pasadena, called "the most East Coast-like part of the Los Angeles metropolitan area" by Andy Meisler in his book The End and the Beginning. The car featured in the episode was a Chevrolet Camaro Z28 convertible. Meisler sardonically wrote that General Motors had "no qualms about seeing their vehicles driven onscreen by a relative of Satan".

Several of the special effects used in the episode were created in a "low-stress" manner that did not rely wholly on computer-generated imagery. During the childbirth scene, gas-burners were set a distance away from a fire-proof bed. The scene was then filmed with a long lens to give the effect that the fire was mere inches away from the bed. Producer John Shiban said that the film crew made "a big deal out of the eyes" to make the scene frightening. The devil sonogram was created by using the videotape of a real sonogram of a crew member's wife. The videotape was then edited to give it a demonic look.

The burnt baby skeleton was built from scratch. Originally, the crew had planned on renting a real fetal skeleton, but the $3,000 cost forced them to make their own. Office manager Donovan Brown noted that, "we got two or three of those adults skeleton models, cut a foot or so off a leg here and shortened an arm there, glued them together to a plaster model of a fetal skull we found, and put together something that worked wonderfully".

== Themes ==
Rather than playing it over the top as a devil incarnate, he [Campbell] played Wayne as a man with a dream. One that has driven him across the world to try and achieve it no matter what lengths he must go to in order to fulfill it.

— Writer Tom Kessenich on the unique presentation of the antagonist.

A main theme in the episode is the horror of child birth. Amann describes the episode as an inversion of the 1968 horror film Rosemary's Baby which is about a woman scared of giving birth to a demonic baby. As with many other episodes of the series, "Terms of Endearment" is heavily influenced by horror films, and features gothic imagery. In addition to Rosemary's Baby and other Roman Polanski films, the episode shows stylistic references to the 1972 film The Exorcist and the 1981 film The Evil Dead. The influence of the genre extends to the casting of Campbell, an actor unfamiliar to the mainstream public but with a prominent cult following among horror fans.

The main antagonist of "Terms of Endearment", Wayne Weinsider, is a child-murdering demon. However, the episode plays against genre archetypes by turning Wayne into a sympathetic villain. Critics have pointed out that the character's presentation was not entirely negative. Some have commented that Campbell humanized the character, portraying him in a manner that adds likability to a character who could have been more sinister. By the time Wayne is defeated, the audience is led to partially identify with him. He ultimately sacrifices himself to save the life of his wife, showcasing heroic qualities and subverting the way that villains are often portrayed in the genre.

== Broadcast and reception ==
=== Initial ratings and reception ===
"Terms of Endearment" originally aired on the Fox network on January 3, 1999, with a tagline of "Born to raise hell. Tonight, something terrifying is about to be born". It earned a Nielsen rating of 10.5, with a 15 share, meaning that roughly 10.5 percent of all television-equipped households, and 15 percent of households watching television, were tuned in to the episode, which was viewed by 18.70 million viewers. It later aired in the United Kingdom and Ireland on Sky1 on April 18, 1999, and received 0.62 million viewers, making it the eighth most watched television show that week.

Upon its first broadcast, the episode received mixed to negative reviews from critics. Michael Liedtke and George Avalos, in a review of the sixth season in The Charlotte Observer, called the episode "just plain bad."

Paula Vitaris from Cinefantastique gave the episode a mixed review and awarded it two stars out of four, calling it a disappointment. Vitaris heavily criticized Mulder's line: "I'm not a psychologist"—reportedly an ad lib from Duchovny himself—noting that it undermines established continuity within the series including the character's background in psychology. Tom Kessenich, in his 2002 book Examination: An Unauthorized Look at Seasons 6–9 of the X-Files, praises the installment, saying, "Place a devil in the plot and I'll follow you to see what you can cook up. ... I enjoyed this tale of a devil looking to be just a normal dad immensely." In his view the episode showed a return to the earlier horror-based narratives the series was known for; though he praises the casting of Campbell, he writes that moments between Mulder and Scully are lacking.

=== Later reception ===
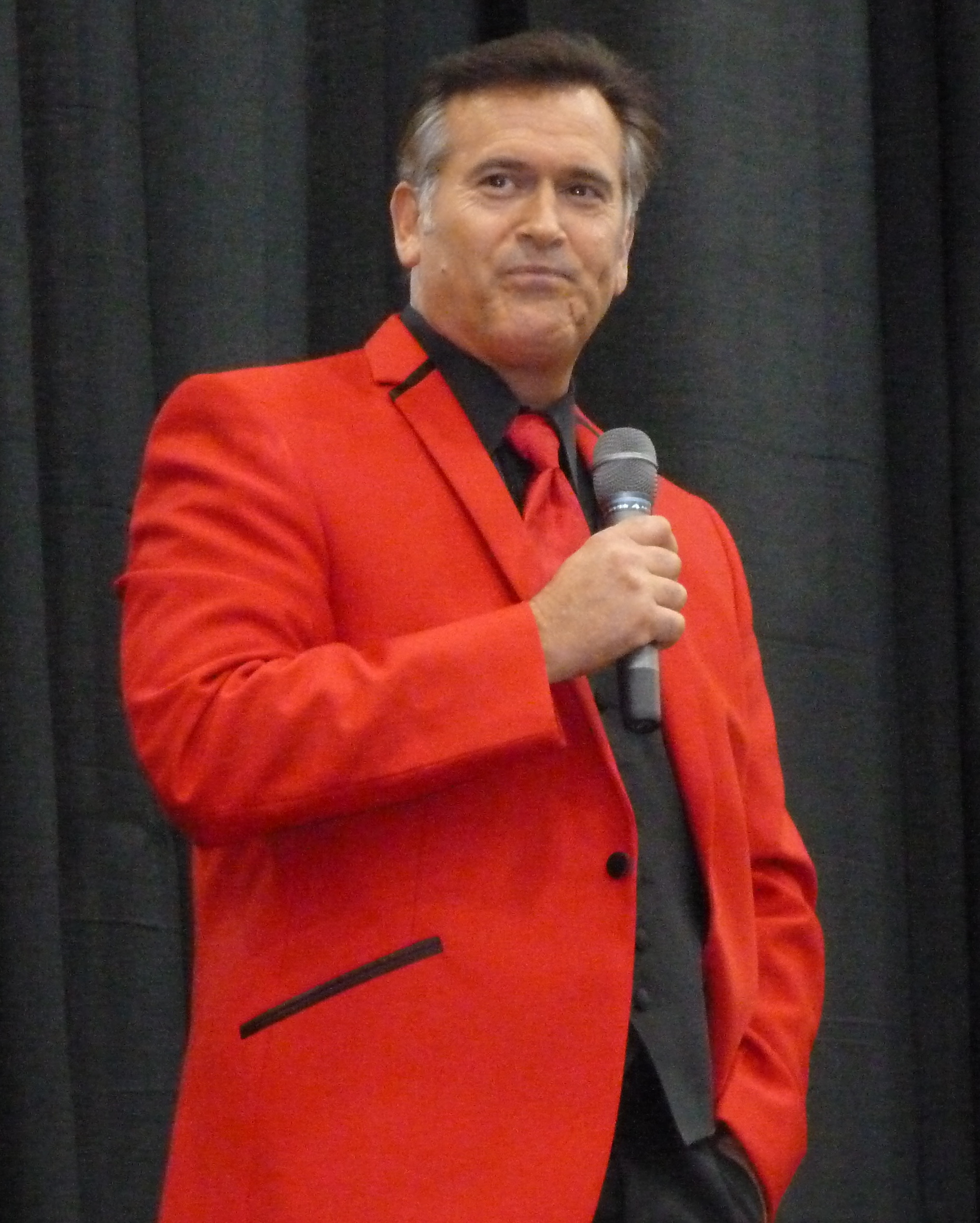
Bruce Campbell received positive reviews for his role as the demonic Wayne Weinsider. Several critics felt that he brought humanity to the character.

In the years following "Terms of Endearment"'s original broadcast, critical reception improved. Robert Shearman, in his book Wanting to Believe: A Critical Guide to The X-Files, Millennium & The Lone Gunmen, gave three stars out of five, describing it as "a very brave story". Shearman felt that the episode suffered from its attempt to balance comedy and horror, "not having enough comedy to explore the premise properly, and not enough suspense to provide much drama". However, both Persky and Campbell were praised for their acting, despite the perceived shallowness of the latter's character. David Wharton of Cinema Blend called Campbell's performance "lowkey" and subtle, commenting that he portrayed Wayne Weinsider "a bit less madcap than many of the roles that he's known for". Wharton praised the casting, describing it as "against type", which he claimed worked well because the material of the episode was more serious and dramatic than usual for the series.

Emily St. James from The A.V. Club gave the episode a positive review and awarded it a "B". She praised Campbell's acting, calling him "the best thing about" the installment, and complimented the entry's general concept. St. James stated that after several humorous stories in a row, "Terms of Endearment" was a "return to form" for the series, bringing the season back to the more straightforward monster-of-the-week format. St. James did, however, note that the episode's biggest weaknesses were its limited use of Scully and its over-the-top use of Spender as a villain. Another critic from The A.V. Club, Zack Handlen, commented that "Terms of Endearment" was notably more influenced by horror than the following week's "The Rain King". Edward Olivier of The Celebrity Cafe stated that the installment strayed away from regular X-Files formula, showcasing Campbell in a "major role".

Retrospective reviews of "Terms of Endearment" with regards to the series as a whole were mixed. In a run-down of The X-Files guest stars who left a lasting impression, Lana Berkowitz from the Houston Chronicle included Campbell, calling him the "demon who wants to be a father." Christine Seghers of IGN described the entry as a "creepy standout" from the sixth season, and named Campbell's guest appearance as the sixth best of the series. Campbell's performance was called "moving" by Seghers, who viewed that Campbell managed to deliver a performance that "completely shed his trademark snark". Cinefantastique later named the dream sequence from "Terms of Endearment" as the ninth scariest moment in The X-Files. Andrew Payne from Starpulse cited the episode as the second most disappointing of the series, calling the premise "lame". Payne stated that only "Chinga", an episode written by author Stephen King, wasted its potential more.

== Impact ==
Following his involvement with this episode, Campbell was considered as a possible contender for the role of John Doggett, a character that would appear in the eighth season. Over a hundred actors auditioned for the role. Due to a contractual obligation, Campbell could not take any work during the filming of his series Jack of All Trades. On potentially being cast as the series regular, Campbell mused, "I had worked on an X-Files episode before, and I think they sort of remembered me from that. It was nice to be involved in that – even if you don't get it, it's nice to hang out at that party." The character was eventually portrayed by actor Robert Patrick. Later in Campbell's novel Make Love! The Bruce Campbell Way, he joked that Patrick "stiffed him out of the role".

"Terms of Endearment" was the first entry of the series written by Amann, who beforehand had unsuccessfully pitched several ideas for the show. Based on the success of this episode, Amann went on to write several more episodes for the series, such as "Agua Mala" later in the same season. During the ninth season, Amann became one of the main supervising producers and had writing involvement in several episodes, most notably "Release" and "Hellbound".

Chris Owens, who portrayed Jeffrey Spender on the show, was negatively affected by the episode. Following the premiere of "Terms of Endearment", he received "strange reactions" from people on the street who were displeased with his character. In the series, the character staunchly disbelieves in the paranormal, and tries to remove the initial report about child-abducting demons in the episode, only for it to be salvaged by Mulder and Scully. People were so annoyed by the nature of the character that Owens was pestered during his everyday life; during one incident, a person angrily called him a "paper shredder".
