= The Rain King =

- The X-Files episode
- Daryl Mootz, the self-proclaimed "Rain King", attaches a prosthetic leg. The harness, which pulled Clayton Rohner's actual leg out of the camera's sight, was later described as "painful".
- Episode no.: Season 6 Episode 8
- Directed by: Kim Manners
- Written by: Jeffrey Bell
- Production code: 6ABX07
- Original air date: January 10, 1999
- Running time: 45 minutes

Guest appearances
- Clayton Rohner as Daryl Mootz; David Manis as Holman Hardt; Victoria Jackson as Sheila Fontaine; Dirk Blocker as Mayor Gilmore; Frankie Ingrassia as Cindy Culpepper; Sharon Madden as Motel Manager; Tom McFadden as Doctor; Dan Gifford as Local News Anchor; Brian D. Johnson as Chainsaw Man

Episode chronology
← Previous "Terms of Endearment"	Next → "S.R. 819"
- The X-Files season 6

"The Rain King" is the eighth episode of the sixth season of the American science fiction television series The X-Files. It premiered on the Fox network on January 10, 1999. "The Rain King" was written by Jeffrey Bell and directed by Kim Manners. The episode is a "Monster-of-the-Week" story, unconnected to the series' wider mythology. "The Rain King" earned a Nielsen household rating of 12.5, being watched by 21.2 million people in its initial broadcast. Critical reception to the episode was mostly mixed, with reactions ranging from negative to positive.

The show centers on FBI special agents Fox Mulder (David Duchovny) and Dana Scully (Gillian Anderson) who work on cases linked to the paranormal, called X-Files. Mulder is a believer in the paranormal, while the skeptical Scully has been assigned to debunk his work. In the episode, Mulder and Scully are asked to investigate the strange weather phenomena occurring in a small town. They find a man, Daryl Mootz, who claims to produce the rain.

"The Rain King" was written by Jeffrey Bell, his first script for the show. The episode was originally purchased as a freelance script, but Bell was later hired on as a full-time writer. Grapevine, Piru, and Culver City, California stood in for the fictional town of Kroner, Kansas during filming. The episode required several elaborate special effect sequences to create heart-shaped hail as well as to simulate a flying cow.

== Plot ==
On Valentine's Day in Kroner, Kansas, Sheila Fontaine and her fiancé Daryl Mootz argue after she announces their engagement in the newspaper. Mootz drives off drunk and crashes when heart-shaped hailstones wreck his car. Six months later, Fox Mulder (David Duchovny) and Dana Scully (Gillian Anderson) arrive in Kroner to investigate Mootz, who now calls himself "The Rain King" and charges residents to make it rain. Although skeptical, the agents witness him apparently bring rain to a dry farm. Later, after a cow crashes through the roof of Mulder's motel room, Sheila confesses to Mulder that strange weather phenomena seem to follow her and that she fears she unconsciously controls the weather.

It is later revealed that local weatherman Holman Hardt is unconsciously controlling the weather through his long-suppressed love for Sheila. Believing he caused Mootz's accident, Holman had been creating rain for him out of guilt, allowing Mootz to believe he had acquired this power himself. When Holman learns that Mootz had been drunk when he crashed, his guilt disappears, as does Mootz's apparent ability to produce rain. When Sheila becomes attracted to Mulder, Holman's jealousy causes a massive thunderstorm. At the town's high school reunion, Holman finally admits his love for Sheila, who reciprocates his feelings. The storm subsides, and the two begin a relationship.

== Production ==
=== Writing ===
"The Rain King" was the first episode written by Jeffrey Bell for the series. Bell had never intended to work in television, but after he wrote three script ideas, he sent them to the producers of the show. The writing staff was impressed with the stories and agreed to buy one—which eventually became "The Rain King"—as a freelance script. While developing the final script, Bell was assisted by Frank Spotnitz, John Shiban, and Vince Gilligan; the three X-Files veterans taught Bell the process of "boarding", whereby note cards are used to flesh out a story. The three pitched the story idea to series creator Chris Carter in August, and Bell was later hired as a permanent show writer.

The script went through considerable changes. Initially, Bell was unaware that Daryl Mootz would "steal the show" and so the episode did not feature him as much. In early drafts the relationship between Holman and the FBI agents was not as strong. In the final draft, Bell attempted to parallel the emotional state of Mulder and Scully with Hardt's characterization, noting, "Here you have a guy who's affecting the weather because he's repressing his emotions [...] and who better to help him than two people whose emotions are repressed and never express their feelings for each other?"

=== Filming ===
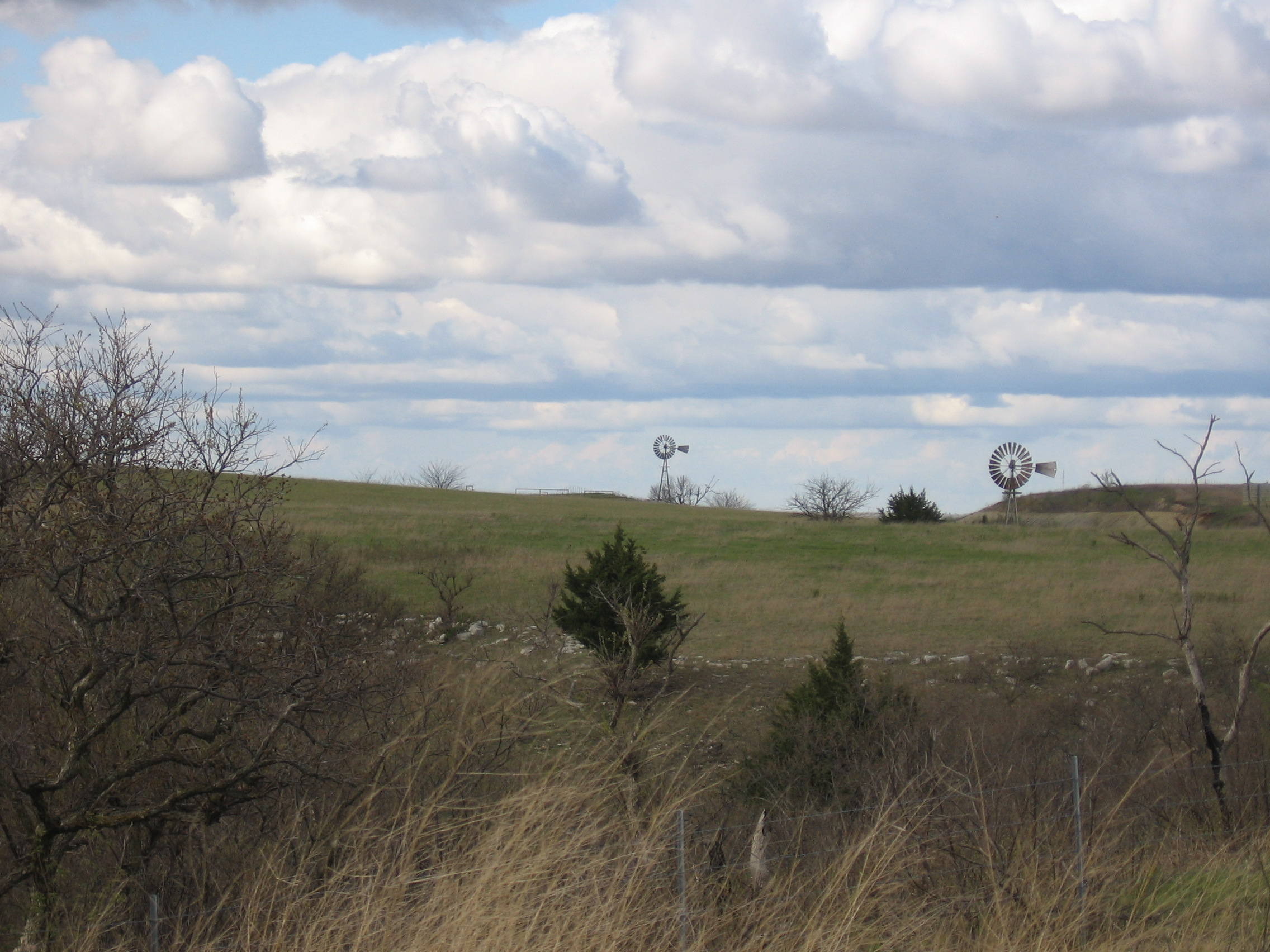
The episode was set in the fictional town of Kroner, Kansas (Kansas prairie pictured).

The scene in which Daryl Mootz crashes his car into a pole after being pummeled by heart-shaped hail was filmed on a "lonely road" near Grapevine, California. The road was so seldom used that the California Department of Transportation had no problem shutting down the entire road so that the crew could film the scene. Director Kim Manners was happy with the way the filming turned out, although he did note that filming the actual crash was difficult, because the car kept crashing into the pole at an undesired angle.

Ilt Jones, the series' location manager, decided to use Piru, California as a stand-in for Kroner, Kansas—a fictitious city named after Bell's college roommate. Exterior shots for "How the Ghosts Stole Christmas" would later be filmed in the same town. The climactic scenes in Kroner's high school were filmed at an abandoned high school in Culver City, California. Corey Kaplan and her art team were tasked with turning the derelict gym into a believable reunion set.

=== Effects ===
I stepped onto the stage just in time to see a brown cow falling through the roof of the set. It was a spectacularly good shot, but it had nothing to do with the script, which said a black and white cow falls through the ceiling. [...] All I knew was that I had to go back and re-render my own [cow] into a brown one. And in a hurry.

— Bill Millar on the color of the cow

Property master Tom Day and costume designer Christine Peters were tasked with designing the fake prosthetic leg that Clayton Rohner wears in the episode. Because Rohner has both of his legs, Peters had to create a unique harness that pulled Rohner's actual leg out of the camera's sightline. Rohner later described the harness as "painful".

An actual motel called the Sierra Palona Motel was used to film the scene in which a cow crashes through Mulder's motel room roof. To secure permission, Jones struck a deal with the owners: if the production staff was allowed to cut a hole in the motel's roof, the show would pay for an entirely new roof afterwards. Duke Tomasick, The X-Files construction coordinator, later said that the "fun part" was "calling local roofers and explaining just what kind of damage they'd be repairing for us".

Special effects producer Bill Millar was tasked with creating a shot of the cow being sucked up into a storm. To do this, he photographed a number of cows in a field for reference. Then, using digital technology he animated the desired effect. This footage was then combined with a shot of a "cow puppet" being dropped on a re-creation of Mulder's motel room at Fox Studios. At the last minute, Millar noticed that the cow puppet's color was different than his computer-generated cow, which necessitated him to quickly change the color. Kim Manners later stated that his biggest regret with the episode is that he did not have David Duchovny respond "Got milk?" after the cow crashed through his roof.

== Broadcast and reception ==
"The Rain King" premiered on the Fox network on January 10, 1999. Following its initial American broadcast, the episode earned a Nielsen household rating of 12.5, with an 18 share—meaning that roughly 12.5 percent of all television-equipped households, and 18 percent of households watching television, were tuned in to the episode. It was viewed by 21.20 million viewers. "The Rain King" was both the highest rated episode of Season 6 and the last episode of The X-Files to be viewed by more than 20 million viewers. The episode aired in the United Kingdom and Ireland on Sky1 on April 25, 1999 and received 0.75 million viewers, making it the third most watched episode that week.

Critical reception was mixed. Tom Kessenich, in his book Examination: An Unauthorized Look at Seasons 6–9 of the X-Files wrote positively of the episode, saying, "'The Rain King' was cute. Very cute. […] And yet I never found myself suffering from cuteness overload. In fact, I laughed and smiled the entire way through." Starpulse named "The Rain King" as the ninth best X-Files episode and praised the lighter approach to the paranormal, saying that the episode was an "ingenious way to use the paranormal motif of the show for something other than thrills". Zack Handlen of The A.V. Club awarded the episode a "B+" grade. Despite criticizing the show for "filming in the land of sunshine and lemon drops" and "border[ing] on that overly twee independent movie vibe", Handlen noted that "the episode’s essential sweetness has enough snarky asides from our heroes […] that it never goes completely off the rails." He did, however, note that the episode's placement, after a string of several humorous episodes, hurt its reception; he argued that, had it appeared in an earlier, darker season, the entry would now be viewed as "a cock-eyed classic".

Robert Shearman, in his book Wanting to Believe: A Critical Guide to The X-Files, Millennium & The Lone Gunmen, gave the episode a mixed review and rated the episode three out of five. Shearman praised the scene featuring the cow getting sucked up by the tornado, calling it "really, very funny" and "comic genius", but noted that "a romantic comedy cannot work by flying cows alone." Shearman also cited casting flaws as to why the episodes was not able to live up to its potential. Other reviews were more negative. In a review of the seventh season episode "Brand X", Sarah Kendzior from 11th Hour Magazine cited "The Rain King" as one of the worst episodes of The X-Files. Paula Vitaris from Cinefantastique gave the episode a mixed review and awarded it two stars out of four. Vitaris heavily criticized the "flying cow" scene—noting that the scene was both "poorly executed" and "offensive" for turning the death of a creature into a joke—as well as the final scene, which, according to her, featured a "false pastel sky". Andy Meisler, in The End and the Beginning, noted that the episode was poorly received by fans on the Internet. Rolling Stone ranked it at #179 of all 217 episodes on their "Every Episode Ranked From Worst to Best" list, calling it "a silly little mess."

== Bibliography ==
- Kessenich, Tom (2002). Examination: An Unauthorized Look at Seasons 6–9 of the X-Files. Trafford Publishing. ISBN 1-55369-812-6.
- Meisler, Andy (2000). The End and the Beginning: The Official Guide to the X-Files Season 6. HarperCollins. ISBN 0-06-107595-7.
- Shearman, Robert (2009). Wanting to Believe: A Critical Guide to The X-Files, Millennium & The Lone Gunmen. Mad Norwegian Press. ISBN 978-0-9759446-9-1.
