= Caroline at Midnight =

- Directed by: Scott McGinnis
- Written by: Travis Rink
- Produced by: Mike Elliott, Roger Corman
- Starring: Clayton Rohner; Mia Sara; Tim Daly; Paul Le Mat; Judd Nelson; Xander Berkeley; Virginia Madsen; Stacey Travis; Zach Galligan; Thomas F. Wilson; Kirk Baily
- Music by: Mark Snow
- Release date: 1993
- Running time: 88 minutes
- Country: United States
- Languages: English, Spanish

Caroline at Midnight is a 1993 erotic thriller film, written by Travis Rink and directed by Scott McGinnis. Rated R, it was released direct-to-video in December 1993. It aired on Cinemax in 1994 and the Showtime Network in 1995. In 1995 it was screened on The Movie Channel's Joe Bob's Drive-in Theater with producer Roger Corman discussing the making of the film with film critic Joe Bob Briggs. In reflecting on her career in a 2009 interview in the Los Angeles Times, Virginia Madsen described her role in this film as indicative of the low quality sex driven films which she was type cast in during the 1990s.

== Plot ==
Jack Lynch (Clayton Rohner) is an investigative reporter who comes into possession of a ledger detailing the criminal activities of two corrupt narcotics detectives, Ray Dillon (Tim Daly) and Phil Gallo (Judd Nelson). While pursuing the story, Jack is contacted by a woman named Caroline, who promises to provide further evidence. However, before they can meet, Caroline is killed in a suspicious car accident. As Jack investigates Caroline's death, he enters into a volatile affair with Victoria (Mia Sara), a woman who claims to be a friend of the victim but is actually Ray Dillon’s wife. The situation escalates when Jack becomes entangled with Susan Prince (Virginia Madsen), a high-level drug dealer who is also being targeted by the corrupt officers. Jack must navigate a dangerous web of betrayal and double-crosses to expose the detectives and survive the deadly conflict between the police and the criminal underworld.

== Cast ==
Clayton Rohner as Jack Lynch
Mia Sara as Victoria Dillon
Tim Daly as Ray
Paul Le Mat as Emmet
Judd Nelson as Phil Gallo
Xander Berkeley as Joey Szabo
Virginia Madsen as Susan Prince
Caroline Barclay as Caroline
Stacey Travis as Christine Jenkins
Hawthorne James as Stan Donovan
Lewis Van Bergen as Prince's Bodyguard
Ben Meyerson as Miguel
Zach Galligan as Jerry Hiatt
Thomas F. Wilson as Officer Keaton
George Wilkerson as Capt. Jacobs
Jay Baker as Policeman
Greg Collins as Bartender
Daniel Bardol as News Room Producer
Doug Wert as Detective Martin
Julie Bick as Detective #1
Kirk Baily as Detective #2
Susan Harvey as Lili
Christina Karras as Party Dancer
Bobbe Renshaw as Waitress
Julie Baltay as Dream Love
Natalie Alexander as Party girl (uncredited)
