= Steven Gilborn =

American actor, educator (1936–2009)

- Born: Steven Neil Gilborn; July 15, 1936; New Rochelle, New York, U.S.
- Died: January 2, 2009 (aged 72); North Chatham, New York, U.S.
- Education: Swarthmore College (BA); Stanford University (PhD)
- Occupations: Actor, educator
- Years active: 1983–2008

Steven Neil Gilborn (July 15, 1936 – January 2, 2009) was an American actor and educator. He portrayed Harold Morgan on Ellen.

Gilborn was born in New Rochelle, New York. He attended Swarthmore College, where he was awarded a bachelor's degree in English and earned a Ph.D. in dramatic literature from Stanford University in 1969, where his dissertation provided a psychoanalytic perspective on the plays of the 19th-century French dramatist Émile Augier.

Before becoming an actor, Gilborn was a professor of humanities at the Massachusetts Institute of Technology and faculty adviser to the Gilbert and Sullivan Society. He also taught at Stanford University, Columbia University and at the University of California, Berkeley. He was married to American landscape photographer Karen Halverson.

Gilborn guest-starred in a number of notable television series, including Columbo (4 episodes), Perfect Strangers, Boy Meets World, The Golden Girls, Malcolm in the Middle, Touched by an Angel, JAG, ER, The West Wing, Matlock, L.A. Law, The Practice, Law & Order, NYPD Blue and The Wonder Years.

He had a recurring role in the sitcom Ellen (as "Harold Morgan", Ellen's father). Another notable recurring role was his three-episode stint as "Mr. Collins", Kevin Arnold's algebra teacher on The Wonder Years. Film credits include "Mr. Phillips" in The Brady Bunch Movie and the hotel owner in Joyride. He also appeared in the sitcom Still Standing.

Gilborn died at age 72 on January 2, 2009, of cancer at his home in North Chatham, New York.

== Filmography ==
=== Film ===
Film
Year	Title	Role	Notes
1983	Enormous Changes at the Last Minute	Phillip	
1984	Vamping	Jimmy	
1987	Anna	Tonda	
1991	He Said, She Said	Ed	
1992	Timescape	Doctor	Release on video as Grand Tour: Disaster in Time
1995	Safe	Dr. Hubbard	
1995	The Brady Bunch Movie	Mr. Phillips	
1996	Dunston Checks In	Artie	
1996	Sweet Evil	Gil	Originally titled Final Vendetta and also known as The Surrogate Mother
1996	Gasp	The Father	Short film
1996	A Very Brady Sequel	Mr. Phillips	
1996	Wedding Bell Blues	Samuel Levine	
1997	Private Parts	Howard's agent	
1997	Alien Resurrection	Father	Voice
1997	Joyride	Arthur	
1998	Dr. Dolittle	Dr. Sam Litvack	
2000	Nurse Betty	Blake	
2001	Reunion	George	
2001	Evolution	Judge Guilder	
2002	Coastlines	Doctor	
2003	The Kiss	Mumford	Direct-to-video
2005	Formosa	Sid Silver	Also known as Social Guidance

=== Television ===
Television
Year	Title	Role	Notes
1982	The Edge of Night	Bill Lowery	2 episodes with episode #1.6822 being credit only
1983	Loving	Sam Fletcher	
1985	Doubletake	Maitre D'	Miniseries
1989	Kate & Allie		Season 6 episode 15: "Trojan War"
1989	Who's the Boss?	Dr. Purcell	Season 6 episode 10: "To Tony, with Love"
1989-1990	The Wonder Years	Mr. Collins	3 episodes, but season 4 episode 23: "The Wonder Years" was a montage episode with footage from previous seasons which is why it is not listed as fourth episode credit
1989-1991	The Golden Girls	Priest/Howard	2 episodes
1990	Brand New Life	Professor Kratzman	Episode 6: "Children of a Legal Mom"
1990	Beauty and the Beast	Martin	Season 3 episode 7: "The Chimes at Midnight"
1990	Law & Order	Judge Marton/Trial Court Judge Greenbaum	2 episodes
1990	Gabriel's Fire	Lt. Axel Roark/Inspector Axel Roark	2 episodes
1990	Perfect Strangers	Herb	Season 6 episodes 7 and 8: "The Men Who Knew Too Much: Part 1" and "The Men Who Knew Too Much: Part 2"
1990	The Dreamer of Oz: The L. Frank Baum Story	George M. Hill	TV movie
1990-1991	Columbo	George	4 episodes
1990-1993	L.A. Law	Lawyer Robert Richards	3 episodes
1991
1991	Get a Life	Jedidiah	Season 1 episode 11: "Roots"
1991	Love, Lies and Murder	Judge Cavanaugh	Miniseries
1991	Absolute Strangers	Dr. Dalton	TV movie
1991	Knots Landing	Mr. Leland	2 episodes
1991	Matlock	Leo Kasabian	Season 6 episode 3: "The Strangler"
1991	Reasonable Doubts	Raymond Lurie	Season 1 episode 10: "Graduation Day"
1991	Teech	Alfred W. Litton	Main role 13 episodes
1991	Danger Team	Carl Stalling	Pilot
1992	Murphy Brown	Dr. Armstrong	Season 4 episode 7: "Heartfelt"
1992	Civil Wars	Robert Cutler	Season 1 episode 12: "Whippet 'Til It Breaks"
1992	Baby Talk		Season 2 episode 17: "The Commitment"
1992	The Torkelsons	Dr. Euless	Season 1 episode 20: "Aunt Poison"
1992	A Private Matter	Harvey	TV film
1992	Desperate Choices: To Save My Child	Dr. Andrews	TV movie
1993	Desperate Rescue: The Cathy Mahone Story		TV movie
1993	Heartbeat	Dr. Green	TV movie
1993	Sisters	Lucas Addler	Season 3 episode 9: "Different"
1993	Crime & Punishment		Episode: "Our Denial"
1993	Brooklyn Bridge	Rabbi Meltzer	Season 2 episode 9: "The Wild Pitch"
1993	Victim of Love: The Shannon Mohr Story		TV movie
1993-1994	Blossom	Mr. Finhorn/Mr. Piper	2 episodes
1993-1996	Dream On	Fred Hoblit	6 episodes
1994	ABC Afterschool Special	Mr. Pritchard	Season 23 episode 1: "Boys Will Be Boys: the Ali Cooper Story"
1994	Saved by the Bell: Wedding in Las Vegas	Steve	TV movie
1994	CBS Schoolbreak Special	Judge Donato	Season 12 episode 1: "The Writing on the Wall"
1994	Lois & Clark: The New Adventures of Superman	Silhouette Cop	Season 2 episode 5: "Church of Metropolis"
1994	Coach	Bill Jennings	Season 7 episode 10: "Working Girl"
1994	Family Album		Miniseries
1994-1997	Living Single	Jeffrey Higgins	4 episodes
1994-1998	Ellen	Harold Cornelius Morgan	Recurring; 27 episodes
1995	Empty Nest	Funeral Director	Season 7 episode 13: "Goodbye Charley"
1995	Unhappily Ever After	Doctor	Season 1 episode 4: "The Bigger They Are, the Harder They Fall"
1995	Grandpa's Funeral	William Braimen	TV short
1995	Hudson Street	Nelson Clifford	Episode 8: "Contempt"
1995	Hearts Afire	Stratton	Season 3 episode 14: "The Outsider"
1996	Murder One	Professor Simon Adler	Season 1 episode 11: "Chapter Eleven"
1996	The Late Shift	Peter Lassally	TV film
1996	ER	Dr. Randall	Season 2 episode 18: "A Shift in the Night"
1996	Common Law	Richard	Episode 1: "Pilot"
1996	Her Costly Affair	Dr. Sorenson	TV film Was originally going to be released as Consensual Relations
1996	NewsRadio	Marty Jackson	Season 3 episode 6: "Awards Show"
1997	Tracey Takes On...	Police Detective	Season 2 episode 2: "Fantasy"
1997	Mad About You	Professor Tomassi	Season 5 episode 13: "Astrology"
1997	Boy Meets World	Arthur Kandib, PhD	Season 4 episode 19: "Quiz Show"
1997	Chicago Hope	Clyde Tannen	Season 3 episode 21: "Positive I.D.s"
1998	The Closer	Saul Verna	Episode 7: "Honor Thy Jack"
1998	Melrose Place	Victor Lewis	Season 7 episode 9: "Where the Hookers Grow"
1998	The Brian Benben Show	Freddy Fontaine	Episode 1: "Pilot"
1998	About Sarah	Lew Roth	TV movie
1998	The Tony Danza Show	Dr. Wagner	Episode 11: "Mini-pause"
1998	Maggie Winters	Mr. Undercoffler	Episode 8: "And Those Who Can't"
1999	Action	Irwin	Episode 5: "Mr. Dragon Goes to Washington"
1999	Get Real	Dr. Chris Carlisle	6 episodes
2000	Family Law	Abe Hollenback	Season 1 episode 14: "Stealing Home"
2000	City of Angels	Dr. Solomon	Season 1 episode 3: "Weenis Between Us"
2000	JAG	James Posey	Season 5 episode 21: "The Witches of Gulfport"
2000	Touched by an Angel	Simon Tate	Season 6 episode 23: "Monica's Bad Day"
2001	Malcolm in the Middle	Dr. Harrison	Season 2 episode 17: "Surgery"
2001	Two Guys and a Girl	Mark Breslin	2 episodes
2001	The Practice	A.D.A. Gavin Bullock	6 episodes
2001	The West Wing	Rep. Paul Dearborn, R	Season 3 episode 9: "Bartlet for America"
2002	The Tick	Judge James Kedukson	Episode 7: "The Tick vs. Justice"
2002	Buffy the Vampire Slayer	Uncle Rory	Season 6 episode 16: "Hell's Bells"
2002	Andy Richter Controls the Universe	Arthur	Season 1 episode 3: "Little Andy in Charge"
2002	8 Simple Rules	Clerk	Season 1 episode 2: "Wall of Shame"
2002	Judging Amy	Mr. Dretler	Season 4 episode 3: "Every Stranger's Face I See"
2002	NYPD Blue	Dr. Corey Barrish	Season 10 episode 10: "Healthy McDowell Movement"
2002-2004	Still Standing	Gene Michaels	2 episodes
2003	The Big O	Old Man	Voice; English version Season 2 episode 6: "Eyewitness"; Credited as Stephan Gilborn
2004	The Bernie Mac Show	Mr. Malvert	Season 3 episode 18: "That Old Mac Magic"
2004	Significant Others	Ethan's Dad	2 episodes
2005	Complete Savages	Town Councilman	Episode 15: "Teen Things I Hate About You"
2005	According to Jim	Bertram	Season 4 episode 19: "Take My Wife, Please"
2005	Out of Practice	Irv	Episode 1: "Pilot"
2006	Without a Trace	Abe Golde	Season 4 episode 18: "The Road Home"
2006	Rodney	Mr. Pratt	Unaired episode: "Potty Mouth"
2007	Damages	Amos Denninger	2 episodes

=== Video games ===
Video games
Year	Title	Role	Notes
2000	Alien Resurrection	Father	Voice
