= Piper Maru =

- The X-Files episode
- A man is possessed by the black oil. First introduced in "Piper Maru", the black oil would later go on to play a major role in the series, including playing a pivotal role in the 1998 X-Files movie.
- Episode no.: Season 3 Episode 15
- Directed by: Rob Bowman
- Written by: Frank Spotnitz; Chris Carter
- Production code: 3X15
- Original air date: February 9, 1996
- Running time: 44 minutes

Guest appearances
- Mitch Pileggi as Walter Skinner; Nicholas Lea as Alex Krycek; Robert Clothier as Christopher Johansen; Ari Solomon as Gauthier; Kimberly Unger as Joan Gauthier; Jo Bates as Jeraldine Kallenchuk; Morris Panych as Gray-Haired Man; Lenno Britos as Luis Cardinal; Stephen E. Miller as Wayne Morgan; Paul Batten as Dr. Seizer; Rochelle Greenwood as Waitress; Joel Silverstone as Engineer #1; David Neale as Navy Base Guard; Tom Scholte as Young Johansen; Robert F. Maier as World War II Pilot; Tegan Moss as Young Dana Scully; Michael Bublé as Submarine Crew Member

Episode chronology
← Previous "Grotesque"	Next → "Apocrypha"
- The X-Files season 3

"Piper Maru" is the fifteenth episode of the third season of the science fiction television series The X-Files. It premiered on the Fox network on February 9, 1996. The episode was written by executive producer Chris Carter and Frank Spotnitz, and directed by Rob Bowman. "Piper Maru" is one of those which helped to explore the series' overarching mythology. Its introduction of the black oil became a storyline milestone for the series. The black oil would later go on to play a much larger role in the series, including a pivotal role in the 1998 X-Files movie. "Piper Maru" earned a Nielsen household rating of 10.6, being watched by 16.44 million people in its initial broadcast. The episode received mostly positive reviews from critics.

The show centers on FBI special agents Fox Mulder (David Duchovny) and Dana Scully (Gillian Anderson) who work on cases linked to the paranormal, called X-Files. In this episode, a French salvage ship sends a diving crew to recover a mysterious wreckage from World War II, but the crew falls prey to a bizarre illness forcing FBI special agents Fox Mulder (David Duchovny) and Dana Scully (Gillian Anderson) to investigate the source. Their investigation brings them face-to-face with Alex Krycek (Nicholas Lea).

"Piper Maru" was written to showcase two visual images Chris Carter had wanted to include in a script "since the beginning of the show". The first of these was that of a deep-sea diver finding a still-living pilot trapped in the wreckage of a World War II-era fighter plane and the second was that of a black-and-white flashback taking place in a submarine. The title of the episode is a reference to the names of Gillian Anderson's daughter, who had been born during the production of the second season.

== Plot ==
Piper Maru, a French salvage vessel, is exploring the Pacific Ocean. Gauthier, a member of the ship's crew, dives down into the sea and finds a sunken fighter plane from World War II. He is shocked to find a man alive in the plane's cockpit, with what looks like black oil in his eyes. When Gauthier returns to the surface, he has become possessed by the black oil.

In Washington, Walter Skinner tells Dana Scully that the FBI's investigation into her sister's murder has been made inactive, despite the evidence that had been recovered. Fox Mulder tells Scully about Piper Maru, which had laid anchor at the same coordinates as another ship believed to have salvaged a UFO; when Piper Maru came to port in San Diego, her crew was found suffering from radiation burns. Aboard the ship, the agents find traces of the black oil on Gauthier's diving suit. Upon viewing a video of the dive, Scully identifies the sunken plane as a P-51 Mustang. Meanwhile, Gauthier returns home and searches for something. When his wife Joan arrives, the black oil passes itself along to her.

Scully visits an old friend of her father's, Commander Christopher Johanson (Robert Clothier), seeking information about the plane. Johanson admits that he had been sent to find a sunken bomber aboard the submarine Zeus Faber and recalls how many aboard the sub suffered from radiation burns while he joined a mutiny against his commanding officer, who had succumbed to the black oil. Meanwhile, Mulder visits Gauthier's home and finds him passed out, covered in the black oil; he has no memory of his experience. Mulder finds a letter from a salvage broker and visits the broker's "secretary", Jeraldine. Mulder follows Jeraldine after her office is invaded by several armed men.

Both Mulder and Joan track Jeraldine to Hong Kong, where Mulder learns that she is a middleman selling government secrets. Mulder tracks down Jeraldine and handcuffs himself to her. Arriving at her office, he finds Alex Krycek (Nicholas Lea) waiting inside, having been selling the contents of the digital tape. Krycek escapes through a window while Jeraldine is shot by a group of men coming down the hallway. Mulder unlocks the handcuffs and escapes. Meanwhile, Joan walks down the hall and encounters the men, creating a flash that causes them all to suffer from the radiation burns.

Meanwhile, Skinner is initially confronted in a restaurant by several men, including the Gray-Haired Man, and is told not to pursue Melissa Scully's case any further. Returning to the same restaurant, Skinner sees a man, Luis Cardinal, arguing with the waitress at the counter and upon confronting him, he is shot. After Mulder catches Krycek in an airport, he tells him the tape is in a locker back in Washington and that he'll give it to him in exchange for letting him go. Mulder lets Krycek go to the bathroom, where he is confronted by Joan. As he departs the bathroom to leave with Mulder, Krycek's eyes show he is now infected with the black oil.

== Production ==
=== Conception and writing ===
Conception of the episode originated in two visual images series creator Chris Carter had wanted to include in a script "since the beginning of the show". The first of these was that of a deep-sea diver finding a still-living pilot trapped in the wreckage of a World War II-era fighter plane; and the second was that of a black-and-white flashback taking place in a submarine. Director Rob Bowman shared with Carter his experiences diving, feeling that an episode based on finding "something creepy" underwater would be a good idea. Carter also wanted the episode to feature the re-emergence of the "MJ documents" last seen in the earlier "Paper Clip".

Frank Spotnitz began working on the episode immediately after writing the earlier third-season episode "731", fleshing out the rest of the concept while on a flight out of Minneapolis. Spotnitz ended up writing his ideas on a magazine, not having brought paper with him, and included in his outline the investigation of Scully's sister's murder and the reintroduction of Alex Krycek. The title of the episode is a reference to the first and middle names of Gillian Anderson's daughter, who had been born during the production of the second season. The name Gauthier, used for the French diver and his wife, was a reference to special effects producer David Gauthier.

=== Filming and post-production ===
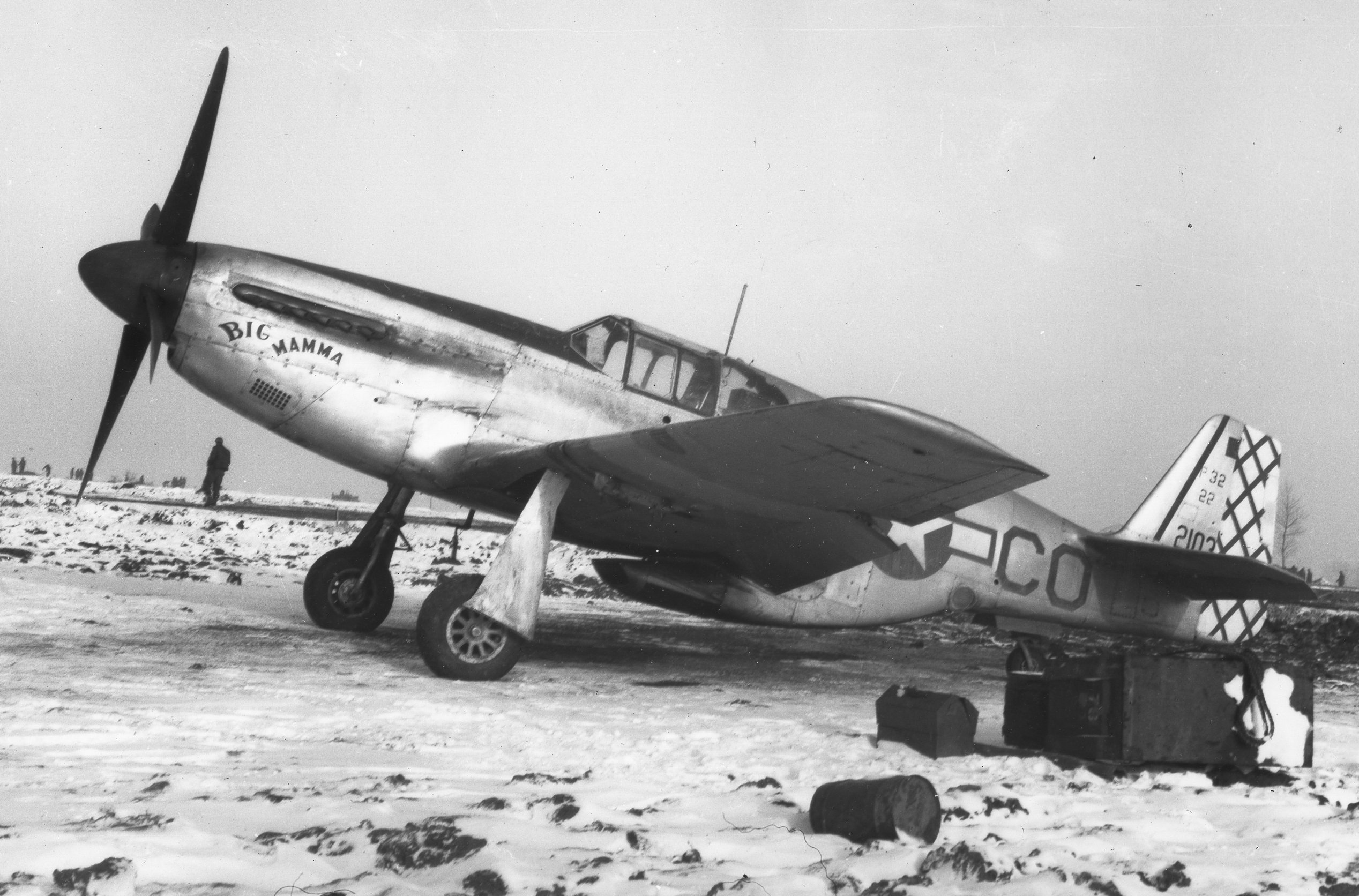
A WWII-era P-51 Mustang. A plane of this model is the source of the black oil in "Piper Maru".

The episode's cold open was filmed in a water tank, using a replica P-51 Mustang plane which had been designed by the art director. Bowman also needed to direct a scene in which Gillian Anderson would react to a memory of playing with her sister as a child; the scene involved digitally compositing the children playing into Anderson's footage. Bowman asked Anderson to act towards a tree as though it were her sister, later telling her "I'm going to tell everybody I can that you just did that great reaction to a tree". Bowman also reshot the episode's ending, as originally Duchovny and Lea were to walk past the camera and continue off-screen. Feeling this was not effective, he replaced this with a walking shot which continued straight towards and into the camera, noting that "Nick will jump in front of a truck if he thinks it will make a scene better".

The on-screen appearances of the black oil were achieved through visual effects, with the shimmering oil effect being digitally placed over the actors' corneas in post-production. The crew went through various iterations to find the two "right" types of fluids. According to physical effects crewman David Gauthier, they used a mix of oil and acetone, which he believed gave the substance a more globular look. Special effects technician Mat Beck was able to digitally bend the oil effect around the shape of the actors' eyes.

The man in the plane in the teaser, Robert Maier, worked as a construction coordinator on the show, and felt that his part in the episode fulfilled a "life-long dream" of working as a stuntman. Nicholas Lea's name was purposely left until the ending credits in order to preserve the sense of surprise.

== Reception ==
It's at this point in the mythology that the onus subtly shifts from Scully coming up with alternate theories of what's going on that make just as much sense as what Mulder's saying to the show desperately trying to keep Scully from knowing things so she can fit into her predetermined "skeptic" role. It mostly works here, because she's busy grieving her sister and being angry that the case into her sister's murder has been closed and coming up with knowledge about radiation burns and stuff, but it becomes more and more of a problem as the series goes along and it becomes more and more obvious that Mulder was right all along.

— The A.V. Club's Emily VanDerWerff

=== Ratings ===
"Piper Maru" premiered on the Fox network on February 9, 1996. The episode earned a Nielsen household rating of 10.6 with an 18 share, meaning that roughly 10.6 percent of all television-equipped households, and 18 percent of households watching television, were tuned in to the episode. A total of 16.44 million viewers watched this episode during its original airing.

=== Reviews ===
"Piper Maru" received positive reviews from critics. In an overview of the third season in Entertainment Weekly, the episode was rated an A. The review described "Piper Maru" as featuring "a tough and sentimental Scully", noting that "action-packed detective work by Mulder enhance[s] an already crackling scenario." Reviewer Emily VanDerWerff of The A.V. Club gave the episode an A and wrote positively of the unfolding mythology, noting that the "great thing about "Piper Maru" is that it still belongs to the period of time when the mythology episodes were exposing us to more pieces of the puzzle, fitting in various things that we were meant to incorporate into the whole. This is the first time we meet the black oil, but it's obvious that others know all about it". Critical Myth's John Keegan gave the episode eight out of ten, and complimented the introduction of the black oil, writing "this episode is a good introduction to the black oil virus, providing a bridge from the mythology elements earlier in the season to the larger scope of the conspiracy to be revealed." Nick De Semlyen and James White of Empire named it the sixth "greatest" episode of the series, describing it as "thrilling", "pacey" and "balanced".

The introduction of the sentient black oil in this episode has also been met with positive criticism. The oil has been described as "the most original and frightening creation of The X-Files' mythology", as "one of the best parts of the show" and has been listed as number two on Den of Geek's "Top 10 X-Files Baddies" countdown, where it was described as "a central part" of the series' mythology.

Gillian Anderson considered the episode an emotionally difficult one, saying "Piper Maru was challenging. There was something about it – having to pull from the past ... how it brought the present and the past together. It was just good to play." Director Kim Manners complimented Anderson's performance, stating "you look at season one and look at season three and that girl exploded as an actress in terms of talent and capability." The 2004 film Alien vs. Predator featured an icebreaker named the Piper Maru, the naming of the ship being a nod to this episode.

== Bibliography ==
- Edwards, Ted (1996). X-Files Confidential. Little, Brown and Company. ISBN 0-316-21808-1.
- Hurwitz, Matt; Knowles, Chris (2008). The Complete X-Files. Insight Editions. ISBN 978-1-933784-80-9.
- Lovece, Frank (1996). The X-Files Declassified. Citadel Press. ISBN 0-8065-1745-X.
- Lowry, Brian (1996). Trust No One: The Official Guide to the X-Files. Harper Prism. ISBN 0-06-105353-8.
