= Once a Thief =

Once a Thief may refer to:

- Once a Thief (1935 film), starring Ronald Shiner
- Once a Thief (1950 film), starring Cesar Romero and June Havoc
- Once a Thief (1965 film), starring Alain Delon, Ann-Margret and Jack Palance
- Once a Thief (1991 film), a John Woo film from Hong Kong
- Once a Thief (1996 film), John Woo's own remake starring Nicholas Lea
- Once a Thief (TV series), a Canadian television series developed from the 1996 film
- "Once a Thief", a 1977 episode of The Bionic Woman
- Once a Thief, a novel by Kay Hooper.
