= Mother, May I Sleep with Danger? =

Mother, May I Sleep with Danger? may refer to:

- Mother, May I Sleep with Danger? (1996 film), a television film
- Mother, May I Sleep with Danger? (2016 film), an American television thriller film
- "Mother, May I Sleep with Danger?", a song by Joy Crookes
