= Once a Thief (1991 film) =

1991 Hong Kong film by John Woo

- Theatrical release poster
- Directed by: John Woo
- Written by: John Woo; Janet Chun; Clifton Ko
- Produced by: Terence Chang; Linda Kuk
- Starring: Chow Yun-fat; Leslie Cheung; Cherie Chung; Kenneth Tsang
- Cinematography: Poon Hang-sang; William Yim
- Edited by: David Wu
- Music by: Violet Lam
- Production companies: Golden Princess Film Production; Milestone Films
- Distributed by: Golden Princess Amusement
- Release date: 2 February 1991
- Running time: 103 minutes
- Country: Hong Kong
- Languages: Cantonese; English; French
- Box office: HK$33,397,149

Once a Thief (Chinese: 縱橫四海; Literal Title: Criss-Cross Over Four Seas) is a 1991 Hong Kong heist action comedy film directed by John Woo, who also wrote the screenplay with Janet Chun and Clifton Ko. The film stars Chow Yun-fat, Leslie Cheung, Cherie Chung, Kenneth Tsang and Paul Chu. The film was released theatrically in Hong Kong on 2 February 1991, before the lucrative Chinese Lunar New Year holiday season begins.

== Plot ==
James (Leslie Cheung), Red Bean Pudding (Chow Yun-Fat) and Red Bean (Cherie Chung) are three orphans raised by crime lord Boss Chow (Kenneth Tsang), and grow up to become high-end art thieves. Boss Chow directs the three to steal a cursed painting located in France.

After the heist in France goes awry, Red Bean Pudding is thought to be dead, and James and Red Bean start a relationship. James finds out that the cursed painting heist was a ploy by Boss Chow to increase its value, and when Red Bean Pudding resurfaces again, the group begins to plot their final heist with the very same painting from France all those years ago.

== Cast ==
- Chow Yun-fat as Red Bean Pudding/Joey
- Leslie Cheung as James
- Cherie Chung as Red Bean/Cherie
- Kenneth Tsang as Chow
- Paul Chu as Godfather
- Bowie Wu as Stanley Wu
- John Tang Yat-gwan as Young Red Bean Pudding
- Tong Ka-fai as Young James
- Leila Tong as Young Red Bean
- Declan Wong as Magician Henchman
- David Wu as Auctioneer
- Pierre-Yves Burton as Mr Le Bond, a Frenchman who hires Joey, and James to steal a painting, but later betrays them. Le Bond is later murdered by Chow's henchmen as a loose end.

== Release ==
The film grossed HK$33,397,149 in Hong Kong.

Columbia Tri-Star released it on DVD in the United States on 22 April 2003. It included no special features beyond trailers. On 27 December 2004, Hong Kong Legends released a DVD in the United Kingdom. Eight months later, on 5 September 2005, the John Woo Collection, a four-disc DVD set, was released. It includes the two action films Bullet in the Head and The Killer.

== Reception ==
On the review aggregator website Rotten Tomatoes, 60% of 5 critics' reviews are positive, with an average rating of 6.5/10. Scott Tobias of The A.V. Club wrote that Woo's style makes up for the film's implausibility and lack of logic. Kevin Lee DVD Verdict wrote that the film has "a lack of focus and an uneven tone". Chris Gould of DVDactive.com rated the film 5/10 and wrote that there was too much slapstick. J. Doyle Wallis of DVD Talk rated it 2.5/5 stars and called it "an odd and annoyingly silly entry during [John Woo's] most creative period".

== Accolades ==
Accolades
Ceremony	Category	Recipient	Outcome
11th Hong Kong Film Awards	Best Film	Once A Thief	Nominated
11th Hong Kong Film Awards	Best Director	John Woo	Nominated
11th Hong Kong Film Awards	Best Actor	Chow Yun-fat	Nominated
11th Hong Kong Film Awards	Best Film Editing	David Wu	Nominated

== See also ==
- Once a Thief (1996), a Canadian television film remake starring with Nicholas Lea and Ivan Sergei that was later spun off into a television series of the same name which ran from 1997 to 1998. Both films were directed by John Woo.
