= Philadelphia Experiment (disambiguation) =

The Philadelphia Experiment is an urban legend about a supposed U.S. Naval experiment on invisibility carried out in 1943.

Philadelphia Experiment can also refer to:

== Film ==
- The Philadelphia Experiment (film), a 1984 science fiction film starring Michael Paré
- Philadelphia Experiment II, the 1993 sequel
- The Philadelphia Experiment (2012 film), a 2012 made for TV film, starring Malcolm McDowell, and again Michael Paré

== Music ==
- The Philadelphia Experiment (album), a 2001 collaborative jazz album featuring Uri Caine, Questlove, and Christian McBride
- The Philadelphia Experiment, a live 2010 album by English progressive rock band Frost*
