= Adrianne Ho =

Canadian model, designer and director

- Born: Toronto, Ontario, Canada
- Occupation: model
- Relatives: Sandrine Holt (sister)
- Website: sweatthestyle.com

Adrianne Ho (born June 13, 1987) is a Canadian model, designer, and director. Ho is the host and creator of a series titled Sweat the City on Canadian television channel One. She is a global brand ambassador for Adidas and has been featured on Sports Illustrated.

She lives in Los Angeles and New York City.

== Early life ==
Ho was born in North York, Toronto. Her father, Man Shun ('Horace') Ho, is Hong-Kong-born Chinese. Her mother, Christiane (née Nicolette), is French.

She is the younger sister of actress Sandrine Holt who also appeared as a model in the 1990s.

== Career ==
Ho began her career in 2005, appearing magazines, fashion editorials, and beauty campaigns.

=== Modeling ===
Ho has been signed to Sutherland Models and Next Model Management. As of 2017, she has appeared on billboards and ads for Vogue China, Esquire Singapore, Female Singapore, Shape Magazine, Mercedes-Benz, Maybelline, MAC Cosmetics, L'Oreal, and Sephora. In 2013 she modeled for Forever 21 and Complex Media. Editorials include: H&M, The Covateur, HYPEBAE, Highsnobiety, Life+Times, Hypebeast, Complex. In 2017, Ho became a global brand ambassador for Adidas.

=== Designing ===
Ho is the designer and founder of Sweat-Crew, a women's line of active-wear. In 2021, she launched her concept brand, The Farmers Market Global. Ho also created Seed Sport, the first luxe activewear collection for Seed Heritage.

=== Other projects ===
Ho runs the lifestyle website: Sweat The Style and has created her own swimsuit-line.
