= Scorched (2003 film) =

- Theatrical release poster
- Directed by: Gavin Grazer
- Written by: Joe Wein
- Starring: Alicia Silverstone; Rachael Leigh Cook; Woody Harrelson; John Cleese; Paulo Costanzo
- Music by: John Frizzell
- Production company: Neverland Films
- Distributed by: Winchester Films
- Release dates: March 18, 2003 (Bradford Film Festival); July 25, 2003 (United States)
- Running time: 89 minutes
- Country: United States
- Language: English
- Budget: $7 million
- Box office: $297,563

Scorched is a 2003 American crime comedy film directed by Gavin Grazer, starring Alicia Silverstone, Rachael Leigh Cook, Woody Harrelson and John Cleese. Scorched follows the story of several disgruntled bank employees who all try to rob the same bank on the same night without knowing that others are doing exactly the same thing.

The film had a poor financial performance at the box office. From the initial budget of US $7 million, Scorched earned back $8,000 at the end of its theatrical run. It was pulled from its theatrical run after a sole weekend in the theaters where it managed to earn $666 per theater.

== Plot ==
Sheila Rilo is a bank teller at Desert Savings Bank in a small desert town. Her boyfriend is Rick Becker, the bank manager who was informed by his superiors that he would be fired if the bank's ATMs were to be robbed just one more time. Sheila and Rick have spent several years in an on-again off-again relationship, in which he uses her between other flings. After Sheila pays for most of Rick's education, he leaves her for his tutor. Sheila decides to exact revenge on Rick by robbing the bank and getting him fired.

On the same night, Stuart and Jason, two other tellers from the same bank, have also decided to rob the bank. Stuart's plan is to steal $250,000 from the bank and bet the entire amount on one game of roulette in Las Vegas. Stuart, who is desperate for excitement in his life, is following the suggestion of his friend Max, even though the intelligent Stuart usually talks Max out of his hare-brained get-rich-quick schemes.

Jason is a nature lover who lives with an orphaned duck. He was promoted to assistant bank manager, a position with much more responsibility but only a $0.55 per hour raise. He feels the bank owes him for years of loyal and underpaid service and he decides to get even by robbing the safety deposit box of a mean-spirited local millionaire, Charles Merchant. Merchant, who got rich from making infomercials and selling videotapes on how to get rich quickly on the real estate market, is the person that shot Jason's duck's mother, therefore making easier Jason's decision to rob Merchant's safety deposit box.

Jason is not the only one with a plan for revenge against the local tycoon. A disgruntled clothing store employee, Shmally, takes her revenge against Merchant the same night by having her friend/roommate Carter help her throw eggs at Merchant's home. Carter, with the help of Shmally, is in the process of cleaning himself up for a job interview at Desert Savings Bank. He is hired and arrives at the bank on Monday morning for his first day, only to be turned away by Rick.

Ultimately, all three bank employees are successful in their individual robberies, with each being completely unaware of the other's plans. After Rick is informed of his firing, he approaches each of them to offer them the job as bank manager. One by one they quit, leaving Rick to offer employment to Carter as he leaves the bank.

In an epilogue, we learn that Carter worked his way up to the assistant manager position at the bank, Max and Stu moved to Las Vegas, Jason traveled south and was never seen again, and Sheila enrolled at UCLA.

== Cast and characters ==
- Marcus Thomas as Carter Doleman, Shmally's roommate and the bank's newest employee
- Alicia Silverstone as Sheila Rilo, bank teller and Rick's girlfriend
- Rachael Leigh Cook as Shmally, clothing store employee and Carter's roommate
- Woody Harrelson as Jason "Woods" Valley, assistant manager and nature lover
- John Cleese as Charles Merchant, local business man and millionaire
- Paulo Costanzo as Stuart "Stu" Stein, bank teller and Max's friend,
- David Krumholtz as Max, Stu's friend
- Joshua Leonard as Rick Becker, bank manager and Sheila's boyfriend
- Ivan Sergei as Mark, a fireman and Sheila's new love interest
- Wayne Morse as Gavin, Mark's fellow fireman
- Jeffrey Tambor as Bank Employer

== Reception ==
=== Critical response ===
The film received generally negative reviews from film critics. Review aggregator Rotten Tomatoes gives it a score 17% based on reviews from 6 critics.

Peter Bradshaw of The Guardian gave the film one star out of five, calling it "a bigger and more disagreeable waste of time than rolling an enormous ball of solid ordure up a steep hill", while Angus Wolfe Murray of Eye for Film, who also awarded the film a one star-rating, called it an "unmitigated disaster" and concluded that "a car wreck has more style". Rich Cline of ShadowsontheWall.com admits called the film is still a "leaden mess", concluding that "while the film is watchable, not a single plot thread comes to life". Critic Matthew Leyland of BBCi gave the film two stars out of five, calling it a "tepid revenge farce", opining that the plot was undercooked and that "attempts at zany humour turn pear-shaped". Sean Axmaker of the Seattle Post-Intelligencer called the film "amusing but tepid", stating that the script was lazy and the characters were only "vaguely likable", condlusing the film was "aggressively amiable and utterly unmemorable".

A favourable review was given by Duane Byrge of The Hollywood Reporter, who called the storyline a "raucously satisfying triumph of good over evil" and "a truckload of laughs".

=== Box office ===
Scorched was filmed in six weeks, ending principal photography on June 23, 2001 but was not released in the United States until July 25, 2003. The film suffered major financial losses during its theatrical run, earning only $8,000 (approximately 0.1%) from a production budget of $7 million. Domestically, the film was only in release for three days starting on August 3, 2003, and it played in only twelve theaters averaging gross earnings of $666 per theater. The earnings for the opening weekend, which turned out to be the film's last weekend as well, ranked the film as the 380th film of 2003 by domestic gross earnings.
