= Sandrine Holt =

British-born Canadian actress (born 1972)

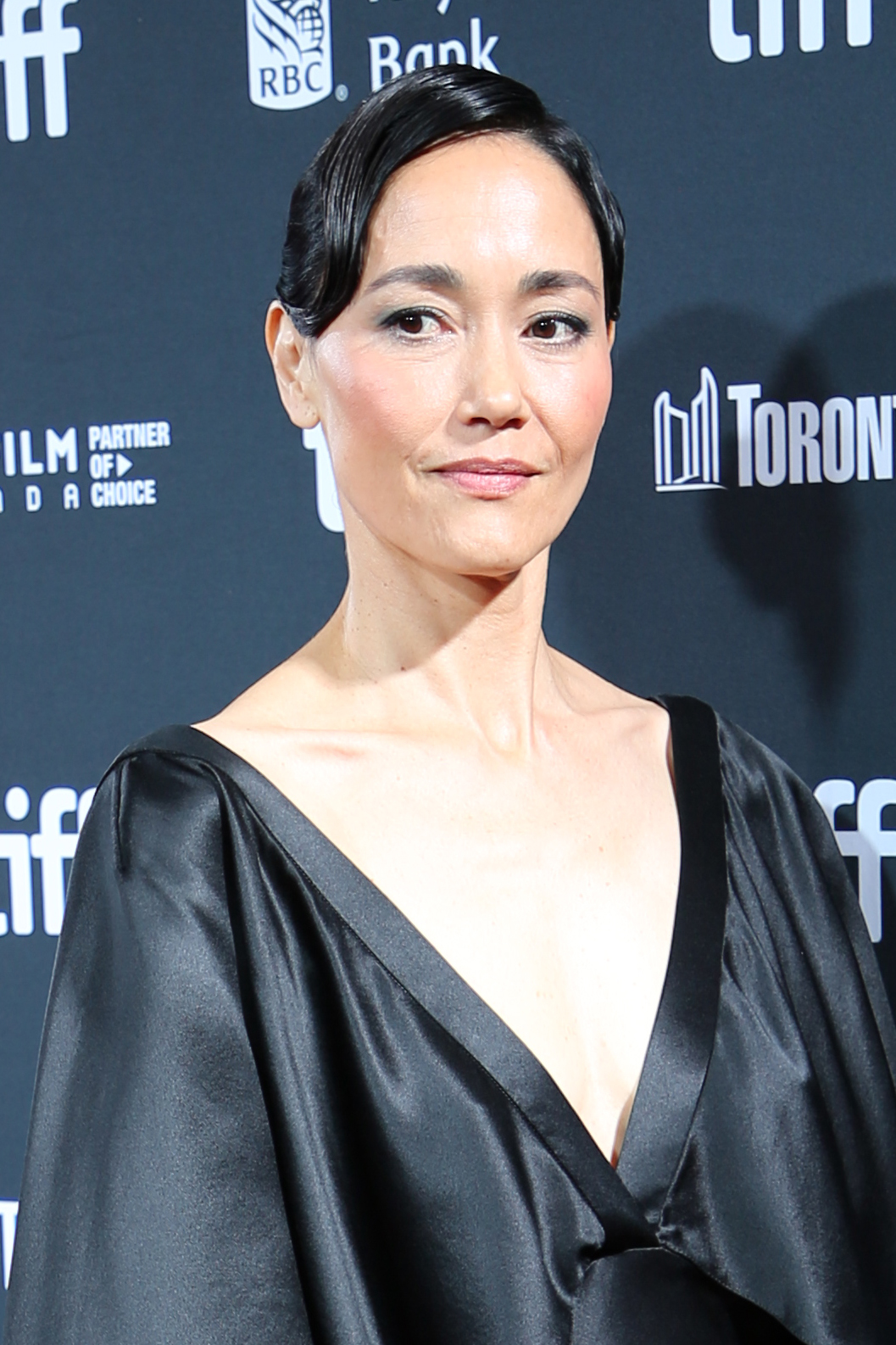
- Holt in 2024
- Born: Sandrine Vanessa Ho; 19 November 1972 (age 53); London, England
- Occupation: Actress
- Years active: 1989–present
- Spouse: Travis Huff (m. 2004; div. 2011)
- Children: 1

Sandrine Holt
- Traditional Chinese: 何家蓓
- Simplified Chinese: 何家蓓
Transcriptions
Standard Mandarin
- Hanyu Pinyin: Hé Jiābèi
- Wade–Giles: Ho Chia-pei
Yue: Cantonese
- Jyutping: ho4 gaa1 bui3

Sandrine Claire Holt (born Sandrine Vanessa Ho; 19 November 1972) is a British-born Canadian actress. She was born in London and raised in Toronto. Her films include Black Robe (1991), Terminator Genisys (2015), and The Shrouds (2025).

== Early life ==
Holt was born Sandrine Vanessa Ho in Croydon. Her middle name was later changed to Claire. Her father, Man Shun ("Horace") Ho, is Chinese. Her mother, Christiane (née Nicolette), is French.

At age five, Holt and her family moved to Toronto, Canada. Holt attended St. Joseph's Morrow Park Catholic Secondary School in Willowdale. She worked as a runway model in Paris before she became an actress. Her younger sister is model and designer Adrianne Ho.

== Acting career ==
Holt's acting debut, credited as Sandrine Ho, was in a 1989 episode of Friday the 13th: The Series entitled "Face of Evil". Her feature film debut was in Black Robe (1991). Subsequent film and television appearances include roles in Rapa-Nui, Once a Thief, Pocahontas: The Legend, The Outer Limits and Resident Evil: Apocalypse.

In 2004, she appeared in Resident Evil: Apocalypse in a minor role as an anchorwoman named Terri Morales. Then again in 2006, she appeared in a recurring role on the television series 24 as Evelyn Martin, the aide to First Lady Martha Logan. In 2007 she appeared in the recurring role of Catherine Rothberg in Showtime's series The L Word.

In 2012, she appeared in Underworld: Awakening as Lida, an Antigen employee who took care of the protagonist's daughter, a prisoner named Subject Two.

In 2013 she appeared in the first season of House of Cards as Gillian Cole, the leader of a grass-roots organization called World Well that provides clean water to developing countries.

In 2015, she appeared in the film Terminator Genisys, and the TV series Fear the Walking Dead.

In 2016, she appeared in MacGyver as Patricia Thornton, an ex-field agent turned director of operations for DXS.

In 2018, she had a recurring role on Law & Order: Special Victims Unit as Dr. Lisa Abernathy, a clinical psychologist who assesses defendants before their trials.

In December 2022, Holt was cast in an undisclosed major role in Daredevil: Born Again. In March 2023, it was revealed that Holt would be portraying Vanessa Fisk, taking over the role from Ayelet Zurer. However, after the series underwent a major creative overhaul, the role was returned to Zurer.

== Personal life ==
Holt was married from 2004-11 to rock producer/engineer Travis Huff.

In 2015, she posed nude for the May issue of Allure magazine.

== Filmography ==
=== Film ===
| Year | Title | Role | Notes |
|---|---|---|---|
| 1991 | Black Robe | Annuka | Nominated—Genie Award for Best Performance by an Actress in a Supporting Role |
| 1994 | Rapa Nui | Ramana | |
| 1994 | Dance Me Outside | Poppy | |
| 1995 | Pocahontas: The Legend | Pocahontas | |
| 1998 | 1999 | Suki | |
| 1998 | Gunslinger's Revenge | Pearl | Italian "Il mio West" |
| 1998 | Il | | |
| 1998 | Airtime | Herself | Short |
| 1999 | Loving Jezebel | Mona | |
| 2000 | Fast Food Fast Women | Giselle | |
| 2001 | Mission | Ima | |
| 2001 | Century Hotel | Jin | |
| 2002 | Ballistic: Ecks vs. Sever | Agent Bennett | |
| 2003 | Happy Hour | Bonnie | |
| 2004 | Resident Evil: Apocalypse | Terri Morales | |
| 2004 | Mr. Jones: Drive | Woman | Short |
| 2004 | Starship Troopers 2: Hero of the Federation | Private Jill Sandee | |
| 2006 | Sam's Lake | Kate | |
| 2011 | Faces in the Crowd | Nina #6 | |
| 2012 | Underworld: Awakening | Lida | |
| 2013 | Chinese Puzzle | Ju | |
| 2015 | Terminator Genisys | Detective Cheung | |
| 2015 | Air | Abby | |
| 2018 | Sorry for Your Loss | Tracey | |
| 2022 | The Aviary | Delilah | |
| 2025 | The Shrouds | Soo-Min | |
| 2026 | Lucy Schulman | TBA | Post-production |

=== Television ===
| Year | Title | Role | Notes |
|---|---|---|---|
| 1989 | Friday the 13th: The Series | Kamichi | Episode: "Face of Evil" (credited as Sandrine Ho) |
| 1995 | Tales of the Wild | Kanata | Episode: "Les légendes du Grand Nord" |
| 1996 | Poltergeist: The Legacy | Ellen | Episode: "The Fifth Sepulcher" |
| 1996 | Once a Thief | Li Ann Tsei | Television film |
| 1997 | Once a Thief: Brother Against Brother | Li Ann Tsei | Television film |
| 1997–1998 | Once a Thief | Li Ann Tsei | Main role, 23 episodes |
| 1997 | The Outer Limits | Jade / Laura | Episode: "Last Supper" |
| 1997 | New York Undercover | Julie Min | 2 episodes |
| 1997 | Two | Diana Polasky | Episode: "Tale of the Tape" |
| 1998 | Once a Thief: Family Business | Li Ann Tsei | Television film |
| 1998 | Bronx County | Herself | Television film |
| 2001 | Earth Angels | Wendy | Television film |
| 2001 | Witchblade | Sandrine Malraux / TV News Reporter | Episodes: "Parallax", "Legion" |
| 2002 | Mutant X | Patricia | Episode: "The Future Revealed" |
| 2005 | CSI: Miami | Melissa Boone | Episode: "Sex and Taxes" |
| 2005 | Las Vegas | Detective Jenny Cho | 3 episodes |
| 2005 | ER | Drew | Episode: "Nobody's Baby" |
| 2006 | 24 | Evelyn Martin | Recurring role, 10 episodes |
| 2006–2008 | Runaway | Erin Baxter | 5 episodes |
| 2007 | The L Word | Catherine Rothberg | 5 episodes |
| 2007 | Fire Serpent | Christina Andrews | Television film |
| 2007 | The Dark Room | Leanne Kisoun | Television film |
| 2008 | Burn Up | Mika | Miniseries |
| 2009 | Bored to Death | Niko Oh | Episode: "Stockholm Syndrome" |
| 2009 | The Phantom | Guran | Miniseries |
| 2010 | The Mentalist | Elise Chaye | Episode: "Blood In, Blood Out" |
| 2010 | The Line | Rachel Wu | Television film |
| 2011 | Sanctuary | Charlotte Benoit | Episode: "Monsoon" |
| 2011 | Flashpoint | Beth Topp | Episode: "Slow Burn" |
| 2012 | The Listener | Christa Merker | Episode: "Poisoned Minds" |
| 2012 | Deadly Hope | Denise Landers | Television film |
| 2013–2014 | Hostages | Sandrine Renault | Main role, 15 episodes |
| 2013–2014 | House of Cards | Gillian Cole | Recurring role, 10 episodes |
| 2015 | The Returned | Julie Han | Main role, 10 episodes |
| 2015 | Fear the Walking Dead | Dr. Bethany Exner | 3 episodes |
| 2015 | Exposed | Jill | Television film |
| 2016 | Damien | Paula Sciarra | 2 episodes |
| 2016 | Blindspot | Vanessa Chang | Episode: "Any Wounded Thief" |
| 2016 | Law & Order: Special Victims Unit | Nora Wattan | Episode: "Fashionable Crimes" |
| 2016 | Mr. Robot | Susan Jacobs | 2 episodes |
| 2016–2017 | MacGyver | Patricia Thornton | Main role, 12 episodes |
| 2016 | The Art of More | Isabel Perry | Recurring role (season 2) |
| 2017 | Love | Jorie | Episode: "A Day", #3.6 |
| 2018 | The X-Files | Karen Hamby | Episode: "This" |
| 2018 | Homeland | Simone Martin | 8 episodes |
| 2018 | The Crossing | Emma Ren | Main role |
| 2018 | Law & Order: Special Victims Unit | Lisa Abernathy | 3 episodes |
| 2019 | FBI | Lynn Carver | Guest Star Episode: "Apex" |
| 2020–2021 | The Expanse | Oksana | 8 episodes |
| 2021 | NCIS: Los Angeles | Laura Song | Episode: "Divided We Fall" |
| 2022 | Better Call Saul | Cheryl Hamlin | 3 episodes |
| 2022 | American Gigolo | Olga Desnain | 4 episodes |
| 2023 | Mayor of Kingstown | Wendy Morris | 2 episodes |
| 2023–24 | Beacon 23 | Coley | 2 episodes |
| 2025 | Your Friends & Neighbors | Detective Rebecca Lin | 5 episodes |
| 2026 | Imperfect Women | Jenny | 3 episodes |
| TBA | Myron Bolitar | Sharon Steele | Recurring role, upcoming series |

== Awards and nominations ==
| Year | Association | Category | Nominated work | Result | Ref. |
|---|---|---|---|---|---|
| 1991 | Genie Awards | Best Performance by an Actress in a Supporting Role | Black Robe | Nominated | |
