= If Someone Had Known =

- DVD cover
- Genre: Thriller; Drama; Crime; Biography
- Written by: Alan Landsburg; Susan Cuscuna; Michael Petryni
- Directed by: Eric Laneuville
- Starring: Kellie Martin; Kevin Dobson; Linda Kelsey; Ivan Sergei
- Theme music composer: Laura Karpman
- Country of origin: United States
- Original language: English

Production
- Executive producers: Alan Landsburg; Linda Otto
- Producer: Don Goldman
- Cinematography: Paul Elliott
- Editor: Karen I. Stern
- Running time: 80 minutes
- Production company: Landsburg Company

Original release
- Network: NBC
- Release: May 1, 1995

If Someone Had Known is a 1995 American crime drama television film based on a true story, directed by Eric Laneuville. It was released on Monday, May 1, 1995 on NBC.

== Plot ==
Katie Liner is the 18-year-old daughter of Jack Liner, a powerful police officer.
At one of his benefit parties, she meets James "Jimmy" Pettit, a man in his early 20's she soon starts dating. Initially, he seems to be the perfect guy; he is well-educated, respectful, polite, popular, and has no records with the police. Nonetheless, Jack is not sure about Jimmy, and he is not enthusiastic when he finds out that Katie is soon engaged. In a short period of time, Katie and Jimmy are married, and she gives birth to a son that they name James.

Soon after James is born, Katie learns that Jimmy is not the perfect man she thought he was, as he starts to show violent behavior, pushing Katie, and slapping her in the face. His apologies afterwards make Katie forgive him every time. After this happens regularly for two straight years, her older sister, Sharon, notices bruises on her skin. Katie admits the truth about Jimmy's abuse but begs Sharon not to reveal the violence. Sharon makes Katie promise to tell her if Jimmy beats her again. By the time she is pregnant with her second child, his aggressive behavior has worsened, and he has also begun to slap James. Desperate, Katie admits to her mother, Ellen, that she is a victim of domestic violence, and that Jimmy isn't treating her right. Ellen convinces her daughter to leave Jimmy, but Jimmy is not willing to let go of his wife and severely beats her for trying to leave him. When he threatens to shoot her, she defends herself by killing him with the shotgun.

Katie is arrested by her father and admits to her lawyer, Paul Chambers, that she is guilty, although claiming that she still loves her husband. Later in the hospital, photos are taken of scars and bruises on Katie's body. Jack learns from Paul that Jimmy had abused Katie on a regular basis and had beaten her up every single day, making him realise that she was only protecting herself and had killed Jimmy out of self defence. He also has trouble accepting that she did not turn to him with her problems, implying how it could have saved her from the abuse, and the current situation. Jack tries to discourage Katie from taking the case to trial, explaining that she could be given life in prison. Katie thinks her case has a chance, though, and wants to show the jury that she was abused. She also confronts Jack for emotionally abusing Ellen (though it's implied it was done unintentionally). She also points out that she never came to him about the abuse in fear he would become overprotective of her in the future. Realizing that it is the truth, Jack tries to better his life, and apologizes to Ellen. Later, Jack has a possible domestic violence perpetrator arrested, despite his friendship with the man.

Once the trial begins, Katie has trouble proving the intensity of the domestic violence, and she is followed around by Wade Blankenship, Jimmy's best friend, who wants revenge for the killing. Additionally, the fact that none of the witnesses reported the violence, instead standing by and doing nothing to help Katie, starts to work against her, as does the fact that Katie herself never tried to get help from law enforcement before killing Jimmy. When Sharon attempts to elaborately answer the question of whether or not she reported her sister's bruises to police, the prosecuting attorney cuts her off, forcing her to say only "yes" or "no." Herbert Evans, an older neighbour of Katie, who was another witness, explains that in his day, whatever happened with another couple, the marriage was "their business".

When Katie testifies, she admits she was so naïve for believing if she provided unconditional love to Jimmy, he would eventually stop abusing her, but she realized that it was never going to stop, and that one of them was going to end up killing the other. (During her testimony, it is shown that Jimmy told her she'd have to kill him and offered her the rifle, but she kept resisting because she loved him too much. However, when he finally told her, "Yeah, that's what I thought!" and hit her across the head with the butt of the rifle, dropped it, then retreated to the bedroom, that was the moment. She walked in and shot him, breaking down crying as she did so.)

The jury then reaches a verdict, finding Katie not guilty. When everyone walks out after the trial, Jimmy's parents, who at first wanted Katie in prison for the murder, apologize to her for her pain and show regret for not knowing what a violent man their son was. The film ends, a year later, with Katie laying a flower at Jimmy's grave, then telling James and her newborn second child that they will have a better life.

== Cast ==
- Kellie Martin as Katherine "Katie" Liner-Pettit
- Kevin Dobson as Jack Liner
- Linda Kelsey as Ellen Liner
- Ivan Sergei as James Charles "Jimmy" Pettit
- Kristin Dattilo as Sharon Liner
- Anna Gunn as Officer Linda Reed
- Alan Fudge as Chief Hunt
- Jennifer Savidge as Dr. Lois Coutu
- Tom Amandes as Paul Chambers
- James Harper as Charles Pettit
- Noah Emmerich as Officer Ed Hunt
- Jennifer Griffin as Marian Pettit
- Rodney Rowland as Doug Pettit

== Background ==
The film is based on the true story of Cynthia Hutto, who shot and killed her husband, James Hutto at their home in North Charleston on December 7, 1978. Cynthia claimed she was a battered wife who had endured physical abuse from James throughout their relationship. After a trial of four days, Cynthia was acquitted of the murder in April 1979. Cynthia's father Ray E. Williams, was a police detective in Charleston County.

== Broadcast ==
The film originally aired on NBC and was later re-aired on Lifetime and its sister channel Lifetime Movie Network.

== Home media ==
The film was released on DVD in 2005 by MPI Home Video, one of a number of TV films issued under their "True Stories Collection" banner.

== Reception ==
Although the film received no critical acclaim, Kellie Martin was praised for her "believable performance". Writers Alan Landsburg, Susan Cuscuna and Michael Petryni received the Christopher Award for their teleplay.
