= Apocrypha (The X-Files) =

- The X-Files episode
- The black oil leaving its host.
- Episode no.: Season 3 Episode 16
- Directed by: Kim Manners
- Written by: Frank Spotnitz; Chris Carter
- Production code: 3X16
- Original air date: February 16, 1996
- Running time: 44 minutes

Guest appearances
- Mitch Pileggi as Walter Skinner; Nicholas Lea as Alex Krycek; William B. Davis as Smoking Man; John Neville as Well-Manicured Man; Don S. Williams as First Elder; Lenno Britos as Luis Cardinal; Tom Braidwood as Melvin Frohike; Dean Haglund as Richard Langly; Bruce Harwood as John Fitzgerald Byers; Brendan Beiser as Pendrell; Kevin McNulty as Agent Brian Fuller; Suleka Mathew as Agent Linda Caleca; Barry Levy as Navy Doctor; Dmitry Chepovetsky as Young Bill Mulder; Craig Warkentin as Young Smoking Man; Michael Bublé as Submarine Crew Member

Episode chronology
← Previous "Piper Maru"	Next → "Pusher"
- The X-Files season 3

"Apocrypha" is the sixteenth episode of the third season of the American science fiction television series The X-Files. It premiered on the Fox network on February 16, 1996. It was directed by Kim Manners, and written by Frank Spotnitz and series creator Chris Carter. "Apocrypha" included appearances by John Neville, Don S. Williams and Brendan Beiser. The episode helped to explore the overarching mythology, or fictional history of The X-Files. "Apocrypha" earned a Nielsen household rating of 10.8, being watched by 16.71 million people in its initial broadcast.

The show centers on FBI special agents Fox Mulder (David Duchovny) and Dana Scully (Gillian Anderson) who work on cases linked to the paranormal, called X-Files. In this episode, Mulder returns from Hong Kong, having found rogue agent Alex Krycek (Nicholas Lea) while investigating a mysterious mind-altering black oil. Meanwhile, Scully pursues the man who she believes killed her sister. "Apocrypha" is the second part of a two-part episode, continuing the plot from the previous episode, "Piper Maru".

"Apocrypha" was the first mythology-centered episode to be directed by Manners, the second episode in the series to feature the antagonistic black oil concept, and made use of a mixture of physical and digital effects to create the effect. The episode's sets were also augmented with digital effects, amplifying what could be constructed within the given budget.

== Plot ==
On August 19, 1953, a burned crewman talks to three government agents about his experience on the submarine Zeus Faber, completing the story told in the previous episode. He explains that he and other crew members were locked in with their captain, who was infected by the black oil. After being knocked out from behind, the black oil leaves the captain's body and exits via a grate into the sea. It is revealed that Bill Mulder and the Smoking Man are two of the agents who are interviewing the crewman.

In the present, Fox Mulder and Alex Krycek return to the United States, but are run off the road by another vehicle. The assailants attempt to apprehend Krycek, but are severely injured when he emits a flashing light. The Smoking Man sees their bodies and orders their destruction. Mulder, who was knocked unconscious in the crash, awakens in the hospital. Dana Scully tells Mulder about Walter Skinner's condition, and says that an analysis of saliva has identified his shooter as the same person who killed her sister Melissa.

The Syndicate meets to discuss the events surrounding Piper Maru and realizes someone is leaking information. Meanwhile, Skinner tells Scully that he recognizes his shooter as the man who was with Krycek when the digital tape was stolen from him. Mulder believes that the black oil is a medium used by an alien to transfer from body to body, and that Krycek is currently occupied by it. Mulder and the Lone Gunmen use Krycek's key to recover the digital tape from a locker at an ice rink, but Mulder finds the case empty. Krycek, possessed by the black oil, returns the tape to the Smoking Man in exchange for the location of the recovered UFO.

As Luis Cardinal is identified as Skinner's shooter, the Syndicate admonishes the Smoking Man for moving the UFO to a new location. By rubbing a pencil over the envelope containing the tape case, Mulder finds a phone number which connects him to the Syndicate's office. Mulder speaks to the Well-Manicured Man, who offers to meet with him. The Well-Manicured Man tells Mulder that a UFO was sunk during World War II and that a cover story of a sunken atomic bomb was used to cover up its attempted recovery. He reveals that anyone can be gotten to, causing Mulder to ask Scully to check on Skinner.

Scully accompanies Skinner as he is being transported in an ambulance. When Cardinal attempts to break in, she tracks him down and arrests him. Cardinal tells her that Krycek is headed to an abandoned missile silo in North Dakota. There, the agents are captured by the Smoking Man's men and are escorted away. Deep inside, Krycek sits atop the UFO as the alien, suspended in the black oil inside of Krycek's body, is painfully excreted out of Krycek's facial orifices, which then seeps into the ship. Skinner recovers and returns to work. Mulder sees Scully at Melissa's grave, explaining that Cardinal was found dead in his cell. Meanwhile, Krycek is trapped within the silo, banging on the door in an attempt to be let out.

== Production ==
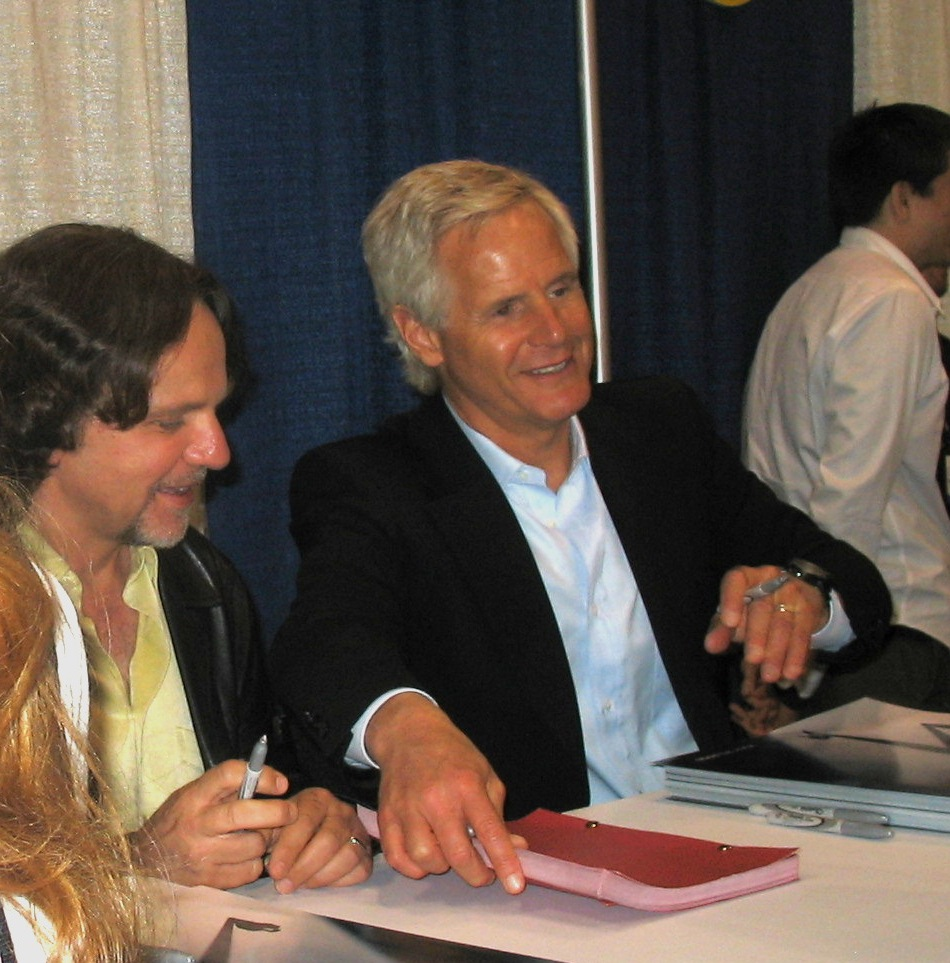
Writers Frank Spotnitz (left) and Chris Carter (right) in 2008

Conception of the episode was based around a visual image series creator Chris Carter had wanted to include in a script "since the beginning of the show". The image was of a black-and-white flashback taking place in a submarine.

The episode's title is a reference to Biblical apocrypha, which series creator Chris Carter felt was appropriate to the episode's thematic concerns—hidden documents and truths not brought to light. Director Kim Manners had directed a number of stand alone "monster of the week" episodes, but this was his first mythology-centered episode. Manners explained that "there is some individual creative contribution from the directors" in stand-alone episodes, but that with mythology episodes "what you need to as a director is to be sure that the performances are there ... and that the yarn is presented in its cleanest and most interesting fashion".

Nicholas Lea was fitted with a mask with tubes for the scene where the alien black oil leaves his body. Lea said filming the scene was horrible, and the scene ended up having to be filmed again a few days later. The similar scene from the start of the episode with the submarine captain was accomplished with a dummy head. The depiction of the oil in this scene was originally filmed using a magnetic fluid pulled along with magnets, although the result of this was deemed not to be "menacing" enough, and looked "a little bit comic". To fix this, the sound stage used to represent the submarine's interior was rebuilt so it could be rocked back and forth, with the movement being used to guide the flow of a different liquid. This effect was then enhanced digitally in post-production. The black oil effect over people's eyes was accomplished by inserting the footage digitally in post production.

The missile silo used for the episode's climactic scene was incomplete when the scene was filmed, as the crew did not have enough time or money left to complete the set. The crew built the incomplete silo on a sound stage around a completed spacecraft prop, and were able to digitally extend the set with computer generated interiors to give the impression of a much larger silo. Exterior shots of the silo building were also enhanced digitally, with various buildings and machinery created with computer generated imagery and composited into the exterior shots.

== Broadcast and reception ==
I don't really know what's going on in mythology episodes. I never have. And I don't mean that I lost the thread once the writers stopped trying to make all the pieces fit. I mean that, right now, even after having watched "Apocrypha" and the episode that preceded it, and all the other mythology episodes before that, I don't know the details. To me, it's just creepy stuff happening for obscure reasons to the characters I care about.

— The A.V. Club's Zack Handlen on the general impression of "Apocrypha"

"Apocrypha" premiered on the Fox network on February 16, 1996. The episode earned a Nielsen household rating of 10.8 with an 18 share, meaning that roughly 10.8 percent of all television-equipped households, and 18 percent of households watching television, were tuned in to the episode. A total of 16.71 million viewers watched this episode during its original airing.

In an overview of the third season in Entertainment Weekly, "Apocrypha" was rated an A. The review noted that the episode offered "some interesting progressions in the grand theme" of the series, although it was also "worth it just for the awesome missile site finale" alone. Writing for The A.V. Club, Zack Handlen also rated the episode an A. Handlen felt the episode was impressive in its general impression, but that the details were not necessarily important; he also added that the cyclical nature of the plot of most mythology episodes was not something he felt negatively about, noting that although the series' protagonists are often defeated, they "can't be corrupted or dissuaded or undone". Co-writer Frank Spotnitz said of the episode "I actually think you didn't learn a lot more about the conspiracy in these two episodes, but emotionally, I think they were really good episodes ... It is really easy to go through a lot of these action things with people dying and never addressing them. So I thought it was very interesting to do so".

Terrorist Timothy McVeigh, a fan of The X-Files, asked his defense team to watch the episode "Apocrypha" with him to showcase its "covert meetings in the night, secret goings-on" and "ghost government." At McVeigh's request, his attorneys included questions on The X-Files in the jury-screening questionnaire.

== Bibliography ==
- Edwards, Ted (1996). X-Files Confidential. Little, Brown and Company. ISBN 0-316-21808-1.
- Lovece, Frank (1996). The X-Files Declassified. Citadel Press. ISBN 0-8065-1745-X.
- Lowry, Brian (1996). Trust No One: The Official Guide to the X-Files. Harper Prism. ISBN 0-06-105353-8.
