= The Philadelphia Experiment (2012 film) =

Science fiction film by Paul Ziller

- Based on: The Philadelphia Experiment: Project Invisibility by Charles Berlitz; William L. Moore
- Written by: Andy Briggs
- Directed by: Paul Ziller
- Starring: Nicholas Lea; Michael Paré; Ryan Robbins; Emilie Ullerup; Malcolm McDowell
- Music by: Michael Neilson
- Country of origin: Canada
- Original language: English

Production
- Executive producers: Josée Bernard; Tom Berry; Lisa M. Hansen; Paul Hertzberg
- Producer: John Prince
- Cinematography: Michael C. Blundell
- Editor: Christopher A. Smith
- Running time: 89 minutes
- Production companies: CineTel Films; Movie Central; Rainbow Pictures

Original release
- Network: Syfy
- Release: July 28, 2012

The Philadelphia Experiment is a 2012 science fiction TV movie. It is directed by Paul Ziller and stars Michael Paré, Malcolm McDowell, Nicholas Lea, and Emilie Ullerup and is based on the urban legend of the Philadelphia Experiment. It is a remake of 1984 film of the same name, which also starred Paré.

== Plot ==
In 2012, scientist Richard Falkner and his team recreate the Philadelphia Experiment for the defense contractor that employs them. They use their boss Kathryn Moore's car in a test of the technology, which renders the car invisible. However, the generators do not shut down as planned, and the car never returns. The USS Eldridge, which vanished in the original 1943 experiment, suddenly materializes in a rural Pennsylvania airstrip. Bill Gardner, the only survivor of the Eldridge's crew, awakens and discovers his crewmates fused into the floor and walls of the ship. Frightened, he flees the ship, while deputy Carl Reed inadvertently boards it during his investigation.

Bill wanders into the nearby town and discovers from a newspaper that he has been transported to 2012. The Eldridge disappears again, causing him to experience a painful seizure and release an electromagnetic burst from his body. He goes to his home in search of his wife, where he meets his granddaughter Molly. After being convinced of Bill's story, Molly uses her computer hacking skills to investigate the Philadelphia Experiment's history. Hagan, an agent sent by Kathryn, attacks them, but they knock him out and escape. Meanwhile, the Eldridge reappears above Chicago, becoming embedded into the top of a skyscraper. Inside the ship, Carl discovers himself stuck with his arm fused to a wall.

Bill and Molly travel to a location given to them by a mysterious caller. When they arrive, they meet Morton Salinger, the scientist who supervised the original Philadelphia Experiment in 1943. Salinger explains that when the government sold the project's assets, Kathryn's company offered him a position, which he rejected out of fear that they would recreate the experiment. Salinger then faked his death and began working on a way to stop the experiment for good. Hagan and his men pursue them, and during the chase, Salinger is fatally wounded by gunfire. Bill and Molly get away, but when Salinger refuses to disclose their destination, Hagan executes him.

The Eldridge jumps again, landing in the Sahara Desert. Falkner determines that the generators from his experiment connected to the generators from 1943, thus creating a link between the two time periods. The Eldridge's leaps, if not stopped, will cause a temporal collapse and destroy the planet. Kathryn, unwilling to believe this, sends fighter jets to bomb the ship, but the electromagnetic energy around it destroys them.

Following Salinger's instructions, Bill and Molly go to his institute, where his colleagues were developing a way to stop the experiment. However, Hagan's team anticipated their arrival and slaughtered all of the researchers. Bill uses his electromagnetic energy to fight back, and the duo are rescued by Falkner, who has lost faith in Kathryn. They go to the site of the present-day experiment, where Falkner explains that the Eldridge's generators are feeding his and keeping the time vortex open. The only way to save the world is for Bill to board the ship, shut down the generators, and return to 1943 with it.

Falkner uses the generators to summon the Eldridge to the lab. Bill enters it and frees Carl by using his energy to remove Carl's arm from the wall. Kathryn arrives with Hagan, having discovered Falkner's treachery, and shoots him. While Hagan enters the Eldridge to kill Bill, Kathryn has her men begin removing disks from the computers, causing the ship to destabilize and prepare to jump again. Bill begins shutting down the generator, but is ambushed by Hagan. The two fight, and Bill overpowers him with Carl's aid before fusing his head to the generator, killing him. Molly kills Kathryn and escapes with Carl, while a time vortex in the sky above the lab pulls the Eldridge into itself with Bill aboard, returning them to 1943 and repairing the timeline.

In the aftermath, Molly marries Carl. A now-elderly Bill, having gotten to live his life in full after returning to his proper time, is seen living with her.

== Cast ==
- Nicholas Lea as Bill Gardner
- Michael Paré as Hagan
- Ryan Robbins as Richard Falkner
- Emilie Ullerup as Molly Gardner
- Gina Holden as Kathryn Moore
- John Reardon as Carl Reed
- Malcolm McDowell as Morton Salinger
- Marsha Regis as Rami
- Chad Krowchuk as Reece
- Allison Hossack as Lena

== Reception ==
Sarah Boslaugh of PopMatters wrote that while she "felt so pummeled by the rapid pace of the illogicalities" that the "clever" and "sentimental" ending "didn't make much of an impression", the film is "actually sort of fun to watch, in the way that bad movies sometimes are." Ian Jane of DVD Talk rated the film 2/5 stars, calling it "ripe with bad effects work, goofy performances and logic gaps big enough to transport a battleship through." Rod Lott of the Oklahoma Gazette opined that the film "doesn't improve upon the premise of scientists cracking invisibility" and called it the "kind of movie that subs technobabble ("Thirty-five Teslas and climbing! Fast!") for true suspense."

== See also ==
- Philadelphia Experiment
