= Nisei (The X-Files) =

- The X-Files episode
- The alien corpse from Mulder's alien autopsy video being removed by black-ops troops.
- Episode no.: Season 3 Episode 9
- Directed by: David Nutter
- Written by: Chris Carter; Frank Spotnitz; Howard Gordon
- Production code: 3X09
- Original air date: November 24, 1995
- Running time: 44 minutes

Guest appearances
- Mitch Pileggi as Walter Skinner; Stephen McHattie as the Red Haired Man; Raymond J. Barry as Senator Richard Matheson; Robert Ito as Dr. Takio Ishimaru / Shiro Zama; Tom Braidwood as Melvin Frohike; Dean Haglund as Richard Langly; Bruce Harwood as John Fitzgerald Byers; Gillian Barber as Penny Northern; Lori Triolo as Diane; Steven Williams as X; Brendan Beiser as Agent Pendrell

Episode chronology
← Previous "Oubliette"	Next → "731"
- The X-Files season 3

"Nisei" is the ninth episode of the third season of the American science fiction television series The X-Files. It premiered on the Fox network on November 24, 1995. It was directed by David Nutter, and written by Chris Carter, Frank Spotnitz and Howard Gordon. "Nisei" featured guest appearances by Steven Williams, Raymond J. Barry and Stephen McHattie. The episode helped explore the series' overarching mythology. "Nisei" earned a Nielsen household rating of 9.8, being watched by 16.36 million people in its initial broadcast. The episode received largely positive reviews from critics.

The show centers on FBI special agents Fox Mulder (David Duchovny) and Dana Scully (Gillian Anderson) who work on cases linked to the paranormal, called X-Files. In this episode, Mulder and Scully investigate the origins of an alien autopsy Mulder believes is real. The investigation uncovers Japanese involvement and sees Mulder smuggle himself onto a secret cargo train to find out more. "Nisei" is a two-part episode, with the plot continuing in the next episode, "731".

Inspired by the atrocities committed by Unit 731, a Japanese research program during World War II, "Nisei" was originally intended to be a stand-alone mythology episode, but was lengthened into two separate parts. The episode featured several scenes that required stunt work, which David Duchovny performed himself. The episode's title refers to the term nisei, meaning the son or daughter of an Issei couple born outside Japan.

== Plot ==
In Knoxville, Tennessee, a mysterious train car is left in a rail yard. After dark, a group of Japanese scientists enter the car and conduct an autopsy on an alien body. The scene is recorded and transmitted via satellite. Suddenly, a US military special forces contingent storms the car and executes the scientists, confiscating the alien corpse in a body bag. Fox Mulder (David Duchovny) purchases an edited video of the autopsy. He believes the tape is authentic, but Dana Scully (Gillian Anderson) is skeptical.

When the agents go to Allentown, Pennsylvania, to track down the distributor of the tape, they find him murdered. At the scene, they pursue and capture a Japanese man, Kazuo Sakurai, who is identified as a high-ranking diplomat. Walter Skinner appears and orders Sakurai released. Before doing so, Mulder searches his briefcase (which he did not turn over to the authorities) and finds both a list of Mutual UFO Network (MUFON) members and satellite images of a ship. The Lone Gunmen identify the ship as the Talapus, a salvage vessel docked in Newport News, Virginia. Meanwhile, Sakurai is killed by an assassin called the Red-Haired Man.

Scully investigates the MUFON group, discovering several women who claim to recognize her from her abduction experience. They have similar implants to Scully's and inform her that they are all dying of cancer. Meanwhile, Mulder goes to the Newport News shipyard and searches the Talapus. Armed men arrive and scour the ship, but Mulder manages to escape. That night, he discovers a warehouse where a craft is being fumigated by a hazmat team. Mulder believes the craft to be of alien origin, recovered by the Talapus.

Skinner later confronts Mulder over the briefcase (which is now in Scully's possession), the absence of which has caused an international incident with Japan. He refuses to assist Mulder any further with his case. Mulder meets with Senator Richard Matheson, who gives him the details on the autopsy and links it with the larger conspiracy of the alien-human hybrids. Mulder investigates further, discovering that the Japanese scientists were members of the notorious Unit 731 during World War II; like Victor Klemper, they were recruited by the U.S. government to develop the hybrids. Mulder believes that the scientists killed on the videotape were working on a secret railway, transporting test subjects.

After sharing her MUFON findings with Mulder, Scully runs her implant through the FBI labs to gather technological information about it. She analyzes the autopsy video, realizing that one of the scientists seen, Dr. Ishimaru, experimented on her during her abduction. Meanwhile, Mulder goes to West Virginia and tracks down the secret train car, watching a group of Japanese men place what seems to be an alien-human subject on board. Meanwhile, another Japanese scientist, Dr. Shiro Zama, waits for the train at a station in Ohio; he is forced to board after his bodyguard is killed by the Red-Haired Man in the restroom. The Red-Haired Man follows Zama aboard the train, which is headed for Vancouver, Canada.

Mulder tracks the train to the Ohio station but learns it has just left when he arrives. Meanwhile, Scully goes to her apartment and is met by X, who warns her to keep Mulder from getting on the train, as the scientists are aware of his presence. Scully calls Mulder, who has managed to drive ahead of the train and is just about to jump onto it from a bridge. Despite Scully's pleas, Mulder jumps onto the top of the train as it speeds past below.

== Production ==
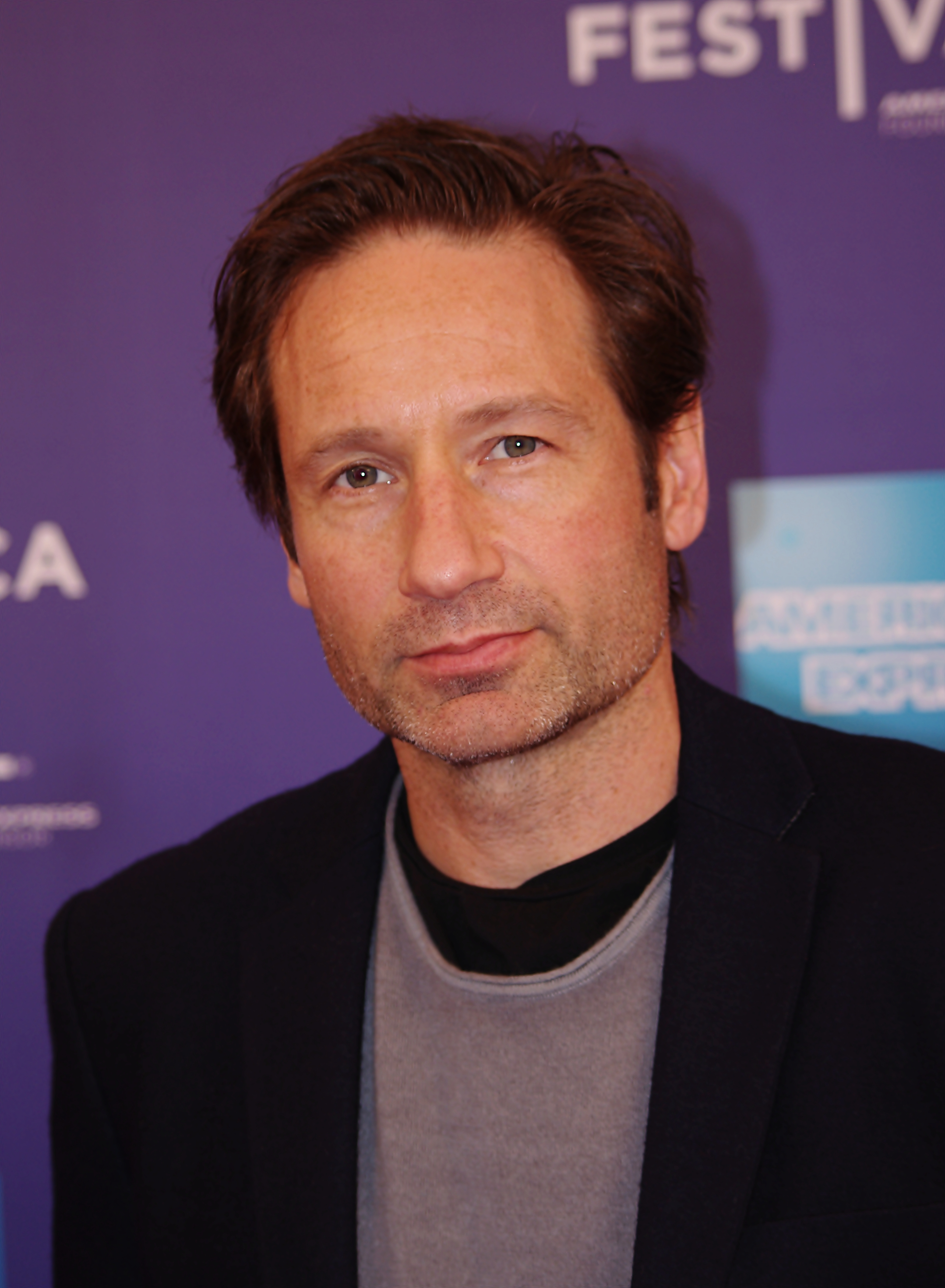
Lead actor David Duchovny performed the stunt involving his character jumping on a train by himself.

=== Writing ===
The idea to create a story involving the 731 unit came from series creator Chris Carter. He noted, "Unit 731 first came to my attention at the same time as it did for a lot of other people, when I read it in the New York Times about what the Japanese did to prisoners of war during the Second World War." Carter decided that an episode based around former war criminals who had received "clemency so [Americans] could use their science" would be "interesting".

Frank Spotnitz was assigned writing duties for "Nisei", which was originally intended to be a stand-alone mythology story and to air as the seventh episode of the third season. However, as Spotnitz developed his script, the episode hit several logistical snags. Most notably, Spotnitz's script featured several scenes filmed on trains: Chris Carter explained, "We found that we were going to have some trouble shooting with trains." Eventually, the sheer scope of the episode caused co-executive producer R. W. Goodwin so much trouble that he wanted to scrap the story. Spotnitz explained, "Goodwin called Chris and said, 'This is unproducable. […] you've got to throw out the script, basically.' I was devastated, and Chris [said] 'Let's make it a two-parter.'" So, the episode was bumped back to number nine and was lengthened to a two parter, resulting in it being delayed several weeks.

=== Filming ===
A co-executive producer called this episode and its second part "731" logistically huge. The stunt where Mulder jumped on a moving train was worked on for six weeks. While there was some alarm in having David Duchovny do the stunt, the actor, who had previously performed his own stunts on an aerial lift in the episode "Ascension", was willing to do it and considered it a fun experience. The producers used trained rangers to play the soldiers in the teaser, part of an attempt to keep the show grounded in reality at all times. An 11-year-old boy was used to play the dead alien on the autopsy table. The boy's twin sister was used to play the alien on the train car. Both underwent extensive makeup including oversized dark contact lenses to create the effect of the alien eyes.

After watching the video bought by Mulder, Scully compares it to the 1995 alien autopsy video—a hoax made by Ray Santilli, a British video producer. Coincidentally, Fox ended up re-airing the alien autopsy video the night following this episode's original air date. The episode features the first appearance of Agent Pendrell, who appeared in several other episodes in the third and fourth seasons. Pendrell was named after a street in Vancouver. The title, "Nisei", refers to the term used, in countries of North and South America, to specify the son or daughter of an Issei couple born outside Japan. The term nisei Japanese American refers to nisei living in the United States.

== Themes ==
Jan Delasara, in the book PopLit, PopCult and The X-Files argues that episodes like "Nisei" and "731," or the earlier episode "Paper Clip," show the public's trust in science "eroding." Delasara proposes that "arrogated" scientists who are "rework[ing] the fabric of life," are causing the public's faith in science to fade drastically, "a concern", she notes, "that is directly addressed by X-Files episodes". Moreover, she notes that almost all of the scientists portrayed in The X-Files are depicted with a "connection to ancient evil", with the lone exception being Agent Scully. In "Nisei," and later in "731", the scientists are former Japanese scientists who worked during WWII for the infamous 731 unit. In their attempts to create a successful human-alien hybrid, they become the archetypical scientists who "[go] too far," a serious factor that Delasara argues "'alienates' [the public] further from science and its practitioners."

== Reception ==
"Nisei" premiered on the Fox network on November 24, 1995. The episode earned a Nielsen household rating of 9.8 with a 17 share, meaning that roughly 9.8 percent of all television-equipped households, and 17 percent of households watching television, were tuned in to the episode. A total of 16.36 million viewers watched this episode during its original airing. "Nisei" later won two Emmy Awards: one for "Outstanding Individual Achievement in Sound Editing for a Series" and one for "Outstanding Individual Achievement in Sound Mixing for a Drama Series."

"Nisei" received largely positive reviews. In a retrospective of the third season in Entertainment Weekly, "Nisei" was rated an A. The review noted that the episode contained "lots of excitement for Scully", though it also described Mulder's plot thread as "equally gripping". Writing for The A.V. Club, Emily VanDerWerff rated the episode an A−, calling it "a hell of a lot of fun". VanDerWerff described the cliffhanger ending as "just phenomenal", and felt that the episode had "the drive of a big-budget action film". However, she noted that it was becoming evident by this stage that the series' mythology was becoming "too big to ever resolve wholly satisfactorily". Paula Vitaris from Cinefantastique gave the episode a largely positive review and awarded it three-and-a-half stars out of four. Vitaris noted that, despite the teaser and first act being "promising enough", the episode "slides downhill rapidly with a storyline that crosses the border into ludicrous." Vitaris called the scene where soldiers kill prisoners "a scene more disturbing than anything else previously seen on The X-Files." Furthermore, she wrote that the final scene between Mulder and Scully was "beautifully written and acted."

Robert Shearman, in his book Wanting to Believe: A Critical Guide to The X-Files, Millennium & The Lone Gunmen, was more critical, rating the episode three-and-a-half stars out of five. The author criticized the plot—despite calling the action sequences "quite breathless"—noting that "it seems rather funny: an entire team of black ops are sent to a small boat, but Mulder is still able to evade them without their noticing." Shearman also called the episode "Planes, Trains, and Automobiles reinvented as an action movie."

== Bibliography ==
- Delasara, Jan (2000). PopLit, PopCult and The X-Files: A Critical Exploration. Mcfarland & Co. ISBN 0-7864-0789-1.
- Hurwitz, Matt; Knowles, Chris (2008). The Complete X-Files. Insight Editions. ISBN 978-1-933784-80-9.
- Lovece, Frank (1996). The X-Files Declassified. Citadel Press. ISBN 0-8065-1745-X.
- Lowry, Brian (1996). Trust No One: The Official Guide to the X-Files. Harper Prism. ISBN 0-06-105353-8.
- Shearman, Robert (2009). Wanting to Believe: A Critical Guide to The X-Files, Millennium & The Lone Gunmen. Mad Norwegian Press. ISBN 978-0-9759446-9-1.
