= Once a Thief (1996 film) =

- Based on: Once a Thief by John Woo; Janet Chun; Clifton Ko
- Written by: Glenn Davis; William Laurin
- Directed by: John Woo
- Starring: Sandrine Holt; Ivan Sergei; Nicholas Lea; Michael Wong
- Music by: Amin Bhatia; Michele Worth
- Country of origin: Canada
- Original language: English

Production
- Executive producers: Terence Chang; Glenn Davis; Christopher Godsick; William Laurin; John Woo
- Producer: Wendy Grean
- Production locations: Vancouver, British Columbia, Canada
- Cinematography: Bill Wong
- Editors: Bert Kish; David Wu
- Running time: 92 minutes

Original release
- Network: CTV
- Release: September 29, 1996

Once a Thief is a 1996 Canadian action comedy television film directed by John Woo. A remake of Woo’s 1991 film of the same name, it served as a backdoor pilot for a 1997-98 CTV series also of the same name. It stars Sandrine Holt, Ivan Sergei and Nicholas Lea.

The film premiered on September 29, 1996. It was originally produced for the American Fox network and was hoped to be the beginning of a weekly series, but Fox passed on it, and the series aired instead on CTV.

== Plot ==
The film is about two orphans - Mac Ramsey and Li Ann Tsei who have spent their life living with the Tang family - a ruthless Chinese organized crime syndicate. Mac and Li Ann were taken in by the Tang Godfather and have formed a close friendship with his son Michael.

When they grow up, Li Ann is betrothed to Michael, but falls in love with Mac so the two scheme to steal money from the Tang family and run off to start a new life. During the heist, Mac is arrested and Li Ann flees to Canada. 18 months later, Mac is released into the charge of a menacing woman known only as the Director who takes him to Canada to work for her crime-fighting team. He soon realizes he will be working with Li Ann and her former cop boyfriend Victor.

== Cast ==
- Sandrine Holt as Li Ann Tsei
- Ivan Sergei as Mac Ramsey
- Nicholas Lea as Victor Mansfield
- Robert Ito as The Godfather
- Michael Wong as Michael Tang
- Alan Scarfe as Robertson Graves
- Jennifer Dale as The Director
- Nathaniel DeVeaux as Dobrinsky
- Greg Chan as Dance MC
- Young Ryu as Li Ann's Dance Partner
- Matthew Walker as Interpol Judge
- Paul Wu as Judge's Aide
- Phillip Tsui as Fong
- Derek Lowe as Mill Security Guard

== TV series ==
The spin-off series ran for one season.

== See also ==
- Once a Thief (1991 film)
- Once a Thief (TV series)
