= Mother, May I Sleep with Danger? (1996 film) =

- Genre: Thriller
- Based on: Mother, May I Sleep with Danger? by Claire R. Jacobs
- Written by: Edmond Stevens
- Directed by: Jorge Montesi
- Starring: Tori Spelling; Ivan Sergei
- Music by: Irwin Fisch
- Country of origin: United States
- Original language: English

Production
- Executive producers: Diane Sokolow; Joan Green
- Producer: Preston Fischer
- Cinematography: Philip Linzey
- Editor: Pia Di Ciaula
- Running time: 90 minutes
- Production companies: Columbia TriStar Television; Mandeville Productions; The Sokolow Company

Original release
- Network: NBC
- Release: September 30, 1996

Mother, May I Sleep with Danger? is a 1996 American television film starring Tori Spelling, Ivan Sergei, and Lisa Banes. The film premiered on September 30, 1996 on NBC.

== Plot ==
A young woman, Erin, breaks up with her boyfriend, Billy, after kissing their mutual friend Kevin and deciding to pursue a relationship with him. Enraged, Billy bludgeons Erin to death and conceals the crime. Some time later, college student Laurel starts a relationship with Billy, who has assumed Kevin's identity. He becomes overly attached, but she is drawn to his intense affection; when he behaves inappropriately, she accepts his apologetic romantic gestures. After meeting Laurel's mother Jessica, Billy becomes increasingly more aggressive and jealous. He convinces Laurel to cut and bleach her hair, both to incense Jessica and to make Laurel resemble Erin. Jessica suspects "Kevin" is not who he claims to be.

To protect his assumed identity, Billy murders Kevin, who had been out of town. He convinces Laurel to live with him in an isolated cabin with no telephone. After she discovers he is not arranging installation of a phone line as he had claimed, she confronts him and decides to move out. He drugs and abducts her, driving her car to her family's cabin. Meanwhile, Jessica uncovers Billy's lies and contacts the police; when she recognizes a missing persons photograph of Erin, having also seen it in Billy's home, the police deduce that Billy has assumed Kevin's identity. Billy calls AAA when Laurel's car breaks down, alerting Jessica to their location. Laurel wakes up and locks herself in the cabin, but Billy breaks in with an axe. Laurel flees onto a lake in a rowboat as Jessica arrives; the women fight Billy on and around the lake. Distracting Billy by pretending to side with him, Laurel knocks him into the water with an oar; Laurel and Jessica embrace and Billy vanishes.

Elsewhere, a young woman resembling Erin and Laurel excitedly makes plans with her new boyfriend, Preston, who is Billy with another new identity.

== Cast ==
- Tori Spelling as Laurel Lewisohn
- Ivan Sergei as Billy Jones/Kevin Shane/Preston
- Todd Caldecott as Jackson
- Gabrielle Miller as Mazie
- Lochlyn Munro as Kevin Shane
- Kevin McNulty
- Bryn Erin as Erin
- Lisa Banes as Jessica Lewisohn
- Suzy Joachim as Detective Sandy Unger
- Teryl Rothery as Running Coach
- Fulvio Cecere as Tow Driver

== Release ==
Although originally planned to be released in theaters, the film failed to find a distributor and finally made its United States debut on NBC 30 September 1996. It was later released in cinemas in both Sweden and Argentina in 1999 and 2000, and it was released direct to VHS in Japan in 1998.

=== Home media ===
In January 2004, Tori Spelling began a campaign to get Mother, May I Sleep with Danger? released on DVD worldwide. Seven years later, on June 6, 2011, Sony Pictures Entertainment finally issued a DVD release.

Mill Creek Entertainment released Mother, May I Sleep with Danger?, along with the remake, on DVD.

| DVD name | DVD Release Date | Run Time | Discs | Format | Region | Studio | Extras |
|---|---|---|---|---|---|---|---|
| Mother, May I Sleep With Danger? | June 6, 2011 | 90 minutes | 1 | NTSC | All Regions | SPE | -Cast Interviews -Behind-the-Scenes Featurettes on the movie's ending, history, and climax -Alternative ending -Trailer |

== Remake ==
Lifetime announced a remake of the film in December 2015 with James Franco serving as executive producer. The plot involved a young woman who falls for another woman who happens to be a vampire. In April 2016, Vulture revealed that Franco had reimagined the film as a "a same-sex vampire love story." Franco stated that he was partly inspired by Will Ferrell's Lifetime movie A Deadly Adoption to make "a very non-Lifetime movie on Lifetime." It first aired on the Lifetime Network on Saturday, June 18, 2016, and starred Leila George, Emily Meade, Nick Eversman, Emma Rigby, and Franco, with Tori Spelling and Ivan Sergei appearing in different roles.
