= Nicholas Lea =

Canadian actor (born 1962)

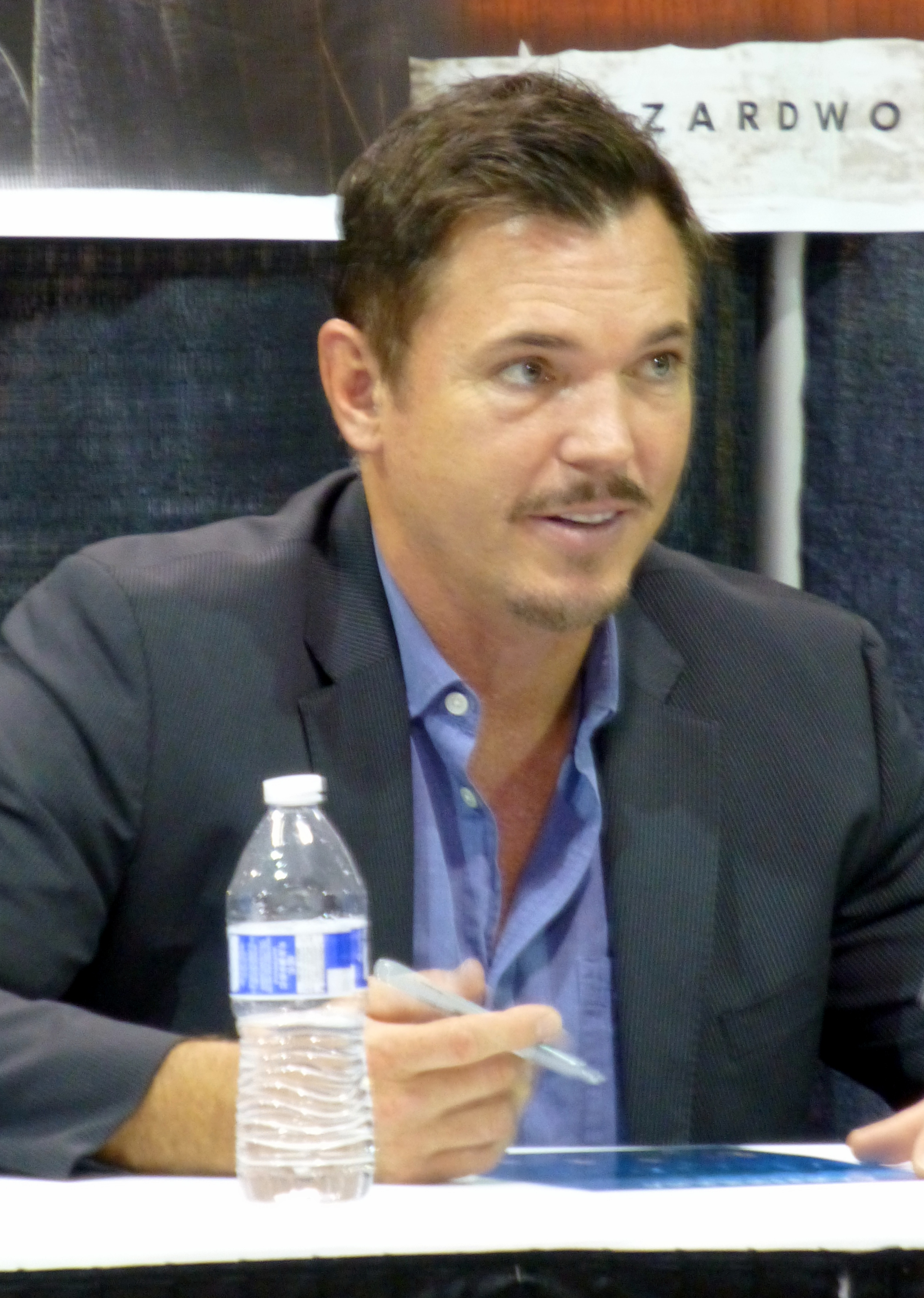
- Lea in 2013
- Born: Nicholas Christopher Herbert; June 22, 1962 (age 64); New Westminster, British Columbia, Canada
- Occupation: Actor
- Years active: 1989–present

Nicholas Lea (born Nicholas Christopher Herbert; June 22, 1962) is a Canadian actor known for his portrayal of Alex Krycek on The X-Files and of Tom Foss on Kyle XY.

== Life and career ==
Lea was born in New Westminster, British Columbia. He attended Prince of Wales Secondary School where he graduated in 1980.

Lea's first major role was on the TV series The Commish where he played Officer Enrico Caruso from 1991 to 1994. It was during this time that he had a minor guest role in a first-season episode of The X-Files called "Gender Bender". The producers were impressed by his performance and when, in the second season, he auditioned for the role of turncoat FBI agent Alex Krycek, he was successful.

Lea guest starred in eleven episodes from 1994 to 1996 and became a popular character amongst fans. Because of his character's willingness to switch sides, he became known within the X-Files internet fandom as the 'ratboy'. In the season three episode "Apocrypha," Krycek was left to die in an abandoned missile silo with an alien ship. This allowed Lea to take a starring role in the series Once a Thief—which followed on from the 1996 John Woo film—alongside Ivan Sergei. The series was cancelled after one season. Lea continued to play Krycek, who became a nemesis not just of Mulder and Scully but particularly of A.D. Skinner (Mitch Pileggi).

Lea co-starred with Lau Ching-Wan, Theresa Lee and Bif Naked in the Hong Kong-Canadian film Lunch with Charles in 2001.

In 2006, Lea had a role on ABC Family's Kyle XY (26 episodes) playing Tom Foss, Kyle's tutor, and was one of the lead actors (playing Ethan McKaye) on the Canadian TV series Whistler. He was also that series' associate producer. He did not return to Whistler for its second season in 2007.

He has guest starred in shows such as NYPD Blue (3 episodes), Andromeda, Burn Notice, Sliders, Highlander: The Series, Judging Amy, CSI (4 episodes) (as Catherine Willows' boyfriend) and Men in Trees (10 episodes) (as Eric, the minister). Nicholas has also guest starred in the ABC remake of the sci-fi series V. He is also a member of the board of directors for the Lyric School of Acting in Vancouver.

Lea appeared in the film Guido Superstar: The Rise of Guido, starring, produced, and directed by Silvio Pollio, including Lea, John Cassini, Terry Chen, and Michael Eklund. The film screened at the 2010 Vancouver International Film Festival. In 2012 he portrayed Eliot Ness who formed the law enforcement group The Untouchables in the Supernatural episode "Time after Time". Also in 2012, Lea starred in the movie The Philadelphia Experiment as Bill Gardner in the lead role. Lea had a minor role on Arrow as Mark Francis, who was Moira Queen's campaign manager. He appeared in three episodes.

== Filmography ==
=== Film ===
Year	Title	Role	Notes
1989	American Boyfriends	Ron	
1990	Xtro II: The Second Encounter	Baines	
1993	From Pig to Oblivion		Short
1994	The Raffle	David Lake	
1995	Bad Company	Jake	
2000	Vertical Limit	Tom McLaren	
2001	Lunch with Charles	Matthew	
2001	The Impossible Elephant	Steven Harris	
2001	A Shot in the Face	The Robber	
2002	Ignition	Peter Scanlon	
2003	Threshold	Dr. Jerome 'Geronimo' Horne	
2003	Moving Malcolm	Herbert	
2003	See Grace Fly	Grace - male	Voice
2005	Chaos	Det. Vincent Durano	
2007	Butterfly on a Wheel	Jerry Crane	
2007	American Venus	Dougie	
2007	Hastings Street	Charlie	Voice, short
2008	Vice	Jenkins	
2008	Crime	Varsity Coach	
2008	Mothers & Daughters	Dinner Party Guest Nicholas	
2009	Dancing Trees	Detective Velez	
2009	Unspoken Rules	Narrator	
2009	Excited	Skidder	
2010	Guido Superstar: The Rise of Guido	Mr. Other Guy	
2012	Crimes of Mike Recket	Mike Recket	
2017	Before I Fall	Dan Kingston	
2018	The Bletchley Circle: San Francisco	George Mason	
2018	The Lie	Detective Rodney Barnes	

=== Television ===
Year	Title	Role	Notes
1991–1994	The Commish	Ricky Caruso	33 episodes
1993	Madison	Jack	1 episode
1993	The Hat Squad	Brett Halsey	1 episode
1993	North of 60	2nd Lt. Lloyd Hillard	1 episode
1994	Robin's Hoods	Loren Faber	1 episode
1994–1996	Highlander: The Series	Cory Raines/Rodney Lange	2 episodes
1994–2002	The X Files	Michel/Alex Krycek	24 episodes
1995	The Marshal	Ray Turner	Pilot
1995	Jake and the Kid	Tony Edwards/Mack Smith	1 episode
1995–1996	Sliders	Ryan Simms	2 episodes
1996	Lonesome Dove: The Outlaw Years	Tom Andrews	1 episode
1996	Once a Thief	Victor Mansfield	TV movie
1996	The Burning Zone	Philip Padgett	1 episode
1996–1998	Once a Thief	Victor Mansfield	Main role
1997	Once a Thief: Brother Against Brother	Victor Mansfield	TV movie
1997	Moloney	Anson Greene	1 episode
1997	Their Second Chance	Roy	TV movie
1998	Once a Thief: Family Business	Victor Mansfield	TV movie
1998–1999	The Outer Limits	Jacob Hardy/Mac 27	2 episodes
2000	Kiss Tomorrow Goodbye	Dustin Yarma	TV movie
2001	Earth Angels	Maximillian	TV movie
2002	NYPD Blue	Frank Colohan	3 episodes
2002	The Investigation	Les Forsythe	TV movie
2003–2004	Andromeda	Tri-Lorn	4 episodes
2004	Judging Amy	Vincent Canello	1 episode
2004	CSI: Crime Scene Investigation	Chris Bezich	4 episodes
2005	Deadly Isolation	Patrick Carlson/Jeff Watkins	TV movie
2005	Category 7: The End of the World	Monty	TV movie
2006	Whistler	Ethan McKaye	13 episodes
2006–2009	Kyle XY	Tom Foss	26 episodes
2007	Drive	Mr. Bright	Unaired pilot
2007–2008	Men in Trees	Eric	10 episodes
2009	Burn Notice	Quinn Luna	1 episode
2009	Without a Trace	Raymond Walsh	1 episode
2010	CSI: Miami	Donald Newhouse	1 episode
2010–2011	V	Joe Evans	5 episodes
2011	Obsession	Sebastian Craig	TV movie
2012	Once Upon a Time	The Woodcutter/Michael Tillman	1 episode
2012	The Philadelphia Experiment	Bill Gardner	TV movie
2012	Supernatural	Eliot Ness	1 episode
2012–2013	Continuum	Agent Gardiner	8 episodes
2013	King & Maxwell	Theo Bancroft	1 episode
2013	The Killing	Dale Daniel Shannon	5 episodes
2014	Arrow	Mark Francis	3 episodes
2015	Unveiled	Bill	TV movie
2019	The Twilight Zone	Captain Donner	Episode: "Nightmare at 30,000 Feet"
2019	The InBetween	Jace Gray	Episode: "While the Song Remains the Same"
2020–2021	The Stand	Norris	5 episodes
2023	The Fall of the House of Usher	Judge John Neal	4 episodes
2025	Tracker	Noah Darview	Episode: "The Disciple"

=== Video games ===
- The X-Files: Resist or Serve (2004) (voice and likeness) as Alex Krycek
- Guido Superstar: The Rise of Guido (2010) (post-production) as Mr. Other Guy
