= Once a Thief (TV series) =

- Also known as: John Woo's Once a Thief
- Genre: Action comedy
- Created by: Glenn Davis; William Laurin
- Starring: Ivan Sergei; Sandrine Holt; Nicholas Lea; Jennifer Dale
- Composer: Amin Bhatia; Ken Worth
- Country of origin: Canada
- Original language: English
- No. of seasons: 1
- No. of episodes: 22

Production
- Executive producer: John Woo; Terence Chang
- Producer: Glenn Davis; Wendy Green; Larry Lalonde (sup.)
- Production locations: Toronto, Ontario, Canada
- Cinematography: Maris H. Jansons; Bill Wong
- Editor: David Wu; Bert Kish
- Running time: 44 minutes
- Production company: Alliance Communications Corporation

Original release
- Network: CTV Television Network
- Release: September 15, 1997 – May 2, 1998

Related
- Once a Thief (1996); Once a Thief: Brother Against Brother; Once a Thief: Family Business

Once a Thief (also billed as John Woo's Once a Thief) is a Canadian action comedy television series, which originally aired on CTV for one season between September 15, 1997 and May 2, 1998. Based on the 1991 Hong Kong film by John Woo, the series is a continuation from the 1996 television film (also directed by Woo, who executive produced the series). It stars Ivan Sergei, Sandrine Holt, Nicholas Lea, and Jennifer Dale.

The series was followed two direct-to-video films: Once a Thief: Brother Against Brother and Once a Thief: Family Business.

In 2002, the show began syndication in the U.S. through October Moon Television.

== Premise ==
Li Ann Tsei, an orphan who grew up amongst the Chinese Tang family - a ruthless criminal operation - falls in love with Mac Ramsey, a thief who works for the family. However, when she is betrothed to Tang heir Michael, the two fake their deaths in an attempt to flee the country. Li Ann escapes, but Mac is arrested and left to rot in a Chinese prison.

Two years later, he is released and taken to Canada where a mysterious woman known as the Director employs him to work for her crime-fighting institution. He soon learns that he will be working as part of a team with Li Ann, and the man she was engaged to, Victor Mansfield, a disgraced police officer. The trio soon are forced to work together under the manipulative Director.

After the success of the 1996 film Once a Thief, which was used as a pilot for the series, Glenn Davis and William Laurin created the series, which premiered in September 1997, with John Woo as executive producer. The show started out with strong ratings, which quickly fell, and the show was put on hiatus in November after 9 episodes. When it returned, in January 1998, ratings had significantly decreased. All 22 episodes of the show aired during the season, but it was not renewed, a fact which the producers were informed of before filming the last episodes of the series.

== Cast ==
=== Main ===
- Sandrine Holt as Li Ann Tsei
- Nicholas Lea as Victor Mansfield
- Ivan Sergei as Mac Ramsey
- Jennifer Dale as The Director

=== Recurring ===
- Robert Ito as the Tang Godfather
- Michael Wong as Michael Tang, his son, originally betrothed to Li Ann.
- Howard Dell as Agent Dobrinsky, the Director's hard-nosed lapdog, played by Nathaniel Deveaux in the film.
- James Allodi as Nathan Muckle, the paranoid librarian at the agency who believes everyone but Vic to be aliens.
- Greg Kramer as Mr. Murphy, one of the "cleaners", assassins who makes problems go away.
- Julian Richings as Mr. Camier, Murphy's partner.
- Victoria Pratt as Jackie Janczyk, the daughter of a mob boss, who comes to work for the Agency.

== Home media ==
Alliance Home Entertainment released the complete series on DVD in Canada in June 2011.

== Reception ==
The first episode, "The Big Bang Theory", was number 7 in the Canadian Nielsen ratings, and the second episode, "Rave On", was number 14. By the end of its run, the show was at the bottom of the list. In episode 20, there is a reference to the audience's unfavorable reaction to the show: when the Director is told that the trio is coming along well, she replies "that depends on who you talk to".

== Allusions ==
Several episodes are parodies of other TV shows and film genres:

- Episode 6, "Wang Wang Doodle", spoofs the leading cast as Earth agent characters from the Men in Black. It also had a gang called The Droogs which used some dialogue, and sampled music from A Clockwork Orange.
- In Episode 7, "It Happened One Night", a character quotes lyrics from Prince's 1999.
- Episode 9, "Jaded Love", spoofs black and white mystery movies of the 1940s and 1950s. The plot device, or MacGuffin, and story elements are borrowed from the Humphrey Bogart film The Maltese Falcon. The ending shot in the episode is composed like the end shot from Casablanca, and uses the dialogue from that same scene in the film which also starred Bogart.
- Episode 18 features several scenes which are parodies of The X-Files, the show on which Nicholas Lea played Alex Krycek:
  - The characters of Agent Clancy (Alexa Gilmour) and Agent Diller (Graham Abbey) are spoofs of Agents Mulder and Scully.
  - The investigation is often done by torchlight, and timestamps appear at the bottom of the screen.
  - The Mulder lookalike has a scene in which he calls Vic "Ratboy" (the nickname of Krycek) and Vic calls him "Spooky" (the nickname of Mulder).
  - Nathan serves as a kind of The Lone Gunmen-esque figure.
  - Agent Clancy and Agent Diller have a cell phone conversation like Scully and Mulder often do, but they are within a few feet of each other and in plain view at the time.
- Episode 19, "Shaken Not Stirred", spoofs James Bond-esque spy dramas.
- Episode 19's subplot, featuring the organisation's assassins Camier and Murphy, is a parody of the Samuel Beckett play Waiting for Godot.
