= Mother, May I Sleep with Danger? (2016 film) =

2016 US television film by Melanie Aitkenhead

- Television release poster
- Based on: Mother, May I Sleep with Danger? by Claire R. Jacobs
- Screenplay by: Amber Coney
- Story by: James Franco
- Directed by: Melanie Aitkenhead
- Starring: Leila George; Emily Meade; Nick Eversman; Ivan Sergei; Emma Rigby; Tori Spelling; James Franco
- Composer: James Iha
- Country of origin: United States
- Original language: English

Production
- Producer: Steven J. Brandman
- Cinematography: Christina Voros
- Editor: Sharidan Sotelo
- Running time: 86 minutes
- Production companies: The Sokolow Company; Rabbit Bandini Productions

Original release
- Network: Lifetime
- Release: June 18, 2016

Mother, May I Sleep with Danger? is a 2016 American television thriller film directed by Melanie Aitkenhead, written by Amber Coney from a story by James Franco, who stars alongside Emily Meade, Tori Spelling, Leila George, and Ivan Sergei. It is a remake of the 1996 film Mother, May I Sleep with Danger?, reimagined as a lesbian vampire love story, with original actors Spelling and Sergei in different roles. Originally announced in December 2015, the film premiered on Lifetime on June 18, 2016.

== Plot ==
A girl named Pearl (Emily Meade) is invited to the house of another girl (Emma Rigby). She turns out to be a Nightwalker, a type of vampire that cannot be harmed in daylight in their human form. After Pearl is bitten and stabs the girl in the heart, she starts to transform into a Nightwalker as the Nightwalker Queen (Zoe Sidel) and her minions give her a captive human as her first meal.

Sometime later, a college girl named Leah (Leila George) is working on a play run by its director (James Franco) and befriends Pearl and falls in love with her, much to the dismay of her mother Julie (Tori Spelling). Leah learns that Pearl is a Nightwalker. Pearl's Nightwalker group preys on abusive men and forcibly inducts women into their group by biting and then not eating them. The Nightwalker Queen has her sights set on Leah as the next member and wants Pearl to bite her, threatening to bite her herself if Pearl does not comply. There is a sexual component to biting as is discussed in a thematic English class' discussion of vampire novels Dracula and Twilight, characterizing the threat as one of rape.

Julie tries to get Leah interested in dating a man named Bob Segal (Nick Eversman) who she knows to be attracted to Leah. Bob feels entitled to Leah as a long-time friend and is upset when Leah indicates contrary interest in women as a lesbian. He conspires with Julie to expose Pearl as a bad person to win Leah's heart. When this is ineffective, he spikes her drink with a date rape drug and attempts to rape her. The Nightwalkers attack him and start to eat him, but are interrupted allowing him to transform into a Nightwalker.

Now given enhanced abilities, Bob leads the Nightwalkers in an assault of Leah which disrupts the play she is in. Julie follows them to the graveyard and is killed by Bob when trying to rescue her. Leah takes vengeance by bludgeoning Bob to apparent death. Pearl apparently kills the other Nightwalkers by ripping the throat of one of them and blinding the other. After getting far away, Pearl states that she can protect Leah. A mourning Leah does not want that and asks her to turn her into a Nightwalker so that they can be together for eternity. Pearl does so and Leah becomes a Nightwalker.

One year later, the Nightwalker gang is still active and heavily scarred where they are now influenced by Bob as they enter a Halloween party.

== Cast ==
- Emily Meade as Pearl
- Leila George as Leah Lewisohn
- Nick Eversman as Bob Segal
- Ivan Sergei as Teacher
- Emma Rigby as Nightwalker
- Tori Spelling as Julie Lewisohn
- James Franco as Play Director
- Zoë Bleu as Nightwalker Queen
- Amber Coney as Sonté
- Gabrielle Haugh as Nightwalker Vampire
- Hadley Winn as Violet
- Christie Lynn Smith as Coral

== Reception ==
The review consensus at Rotten Tomatoes for Mother, May I Sleep with Danger? had 62% of critics recommending the film, based on 13 reviews and an average rating of 5.4 out of 10. Mother, May I Sleep with Danger? was met with mixed reviews from critics noted at review aggregator Metacritic. This release received a weighted average score of 46 out of 100, based on 10 reviews. Sam Adams of Rolling Stone wrote a mostly favorable review, commenting that the film was "junk that knows it's junk" and that its "great feat is that it's a movie that manages to be both exploitative and progressive, in the way that Russ Meyer's movies feature strong female role models and also provide ample opportunity to peer down the front of busty young women's blouses." Daniel Fienberg of The Hollywood Reporter wrote that the film took itself too seriously in its first portion but that its third act "kicks into gear".
