= Ivan Sergei =

American actor

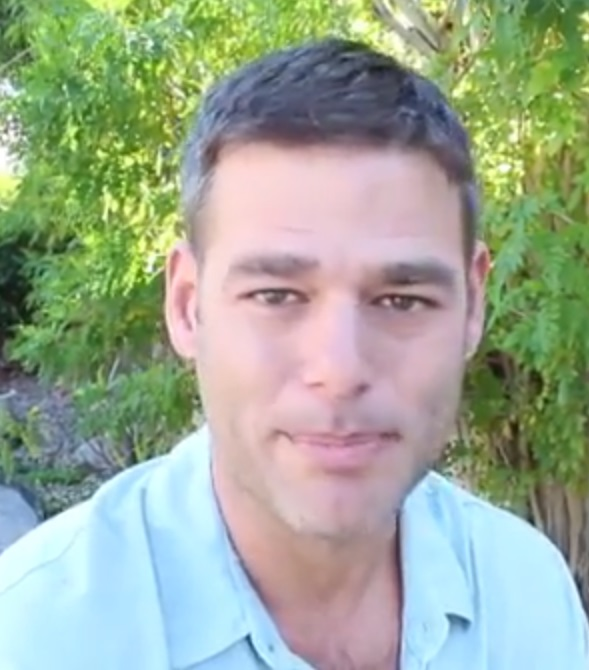
- Sergei behind the scenes of the film Hidden Away (2013)
- Born: Ivan Sergei Gaudio; New Jersey, United States
- Occupation: Actor
- Years active: 1990–present

Ivan Sergei (born Ivan Sergei Gaudio) is an American actor known for his work in television. His best known roles are Dr. Peter Winslow in Crossing Jordan and Henry Mitchell in Charmed.

== Life ==
Ivan Sergei Gaudio was born in New Jersey, and is of Dutch and Italian descent. He attended Hawthorne High School, where he was a member of the graduating class of 1989, and played on the Hawthorne Cubs Football team.

== Career ==
Sergei first became known when he starred in John Woo's 1996 film Once a Thief, and then returned along with the rest of the cast for the 1997 television series, which only lasted one season. He next starred alongside Amanda Peet in the series Jack & Jill which ran from 1999 to 2001, and after this he joined the cast of the abruptly cancelled Wednesday 9:30 (8:30 Central) (2002). From 2003 to 2004, he starred on Crossing Jordan, and then in 2004 was part of the cast of Hawaii.

Sergei has also had roles in If Someone Had Known (1995), Dangerous Minds (1995), Mother, May I Sleep with Danger? (1996), The Opposite of Sex (1998), Scorched (2003), and 10.5 (2004). He has guest starred on Touched by an Angel, Cybill and Party of Five. In 2005 and 2006, he starred in Charmed as Henry Mitchell, the boyfriend and later husband of the character Paige Matthews. He also had a minor role in The Break-Up with Jennifer Aniston and Vince Vaughn.

He co-starred with Jenny McCarthy in Santa Baby. He guest-starred in the October 2008 CSI: Miami episode "Raging Cannibal". Sergei played the lead character in the TV mini-series Jack Hunter and the Lost Treasure of Ugarit (2008). In 2009, he appeared in the Lifetime Nora Roberts adaptation High Noon, and had a guest role in episode 3 of Warehouse 13 with his Jack Hunter co-star Joanne Kelly.

== Filmography ==
=== Film ===
| Year | Title | Role | Notes |
|---|---|---|---|
| 1990 | Ghoul School | O'Rawe | Video |
| 1995 | Gunfighter's Moon | Spud Walker | |
| 1995 | Dangerous Minds | Huero | |
| 1998 | Airtime | Unknown | Short |
| 1998 | The Opposite of Sex | Matt Mateo | |
| 2000 | Playing Mona Lisa | Eddie / Carl / Ben | |
| 2001 | The Big Day | John | |
| 2003 | Scorched | Mark | Independent film |
| 2006 | The Break-Up | Carson Wigham | |
| 2011 | Final Sale | Ryan Graves | |
| 2012 | Unstable | Nick Reese | |
| 2012 | Jewtopia | Christian O'Connell | |
| 2012 | Vamps | Detective | |
| 2014 | How to Make Love Like an Englishman | Tim Prince | |
| 2015 | Dead End | | Short film |
| 2017 | Broken Memories | Levi | |
| 2017 | Fatal Instinct | Jack Gates | |
| 2020 | Magic Max | Max Hart | |

=== Television ===
| Year | Title | Role | Notes |
|---|---|---|---|
| 1994 | Touched by an Angel | Peter Enloe | Episode: "Show Me the Way Home" |
| 1994 | Bionic Ever After? | Astaad Rashid | TV movie |
| 1995 | Cybill | Kelly | Episode: "Virgin, Mother, Crone" |
| 1995 | If Someone Had Known | Jimmy Pettit | TV movie |
| 1996 | Party of Five | Sean | Episode: "Valentine's Day" |
| 1996 | Star Command | Ens. Phillip Jackson | TV movie |
| 1996 | Kindred: The Embraced | Zane | Episode: "Live Hard, Die Young, and Leave a Good Looking Corpse" |
| 1996 | The Rockford Files: Friends and Foul Play | Corey Honeywell | TV movie |
| 1996 | Once a Thief | Mac Ramsey | TV movie |
| 1996 | Mother, May I Sleep with Danger? | Billy Jones (Kevin Shane) | TV movie |
| 1996–98 | Once a Thief | Mac Ramsey | Main cast, 22 episodes |
| 1999–2001 | Jack & Jill | David 'Jill' Jillefsky | Main cast, 32 episodes |
| 2002 | Wednesday 9:30 (8:30 Central) | David Weiss | Main cast, 8 episodes |
| 2003–04 | Crossing Jordan | Dr. Peter Winslow | Recurring (Seasons 1–2), Main cast (Season 3); 22 episodes |
| 2004 | Hawaii | Danny Edwards | Main cast, 8 episodes |
| 2004 | 10.5 | Dr. Zack Nolan | TV miniseries |
| 2005–06 | Charmed | Henry Mitchell | Recurring, 11 episodes |
| 2005 | Drive | Alex Tully | Unaired Pilot |
| 2006 | Santa Baby | Luke Jessup | TV movie |
| 2008 | CSI: Miami | Greg Donner | Episode: "Raging Cannibal" |
| 2008 | To Love and Die | Blue | TV movie |
| 2008–09 | Jack Hunter and the Lost Treasure of Ugarit | Jack Hunter | TV miniseries |
| 2009 | High Noon | Duncan Swift | TV movie |
| 2008–09 | Army Wives | Collin Richards | 2 episodes |
| 2009 | Warehouse 13 | Ross | Episode: "Magnetism" |
| 2010 | A Trace of Danger | Dave | TV movie |
| 2010 | Gravity | Robert | Main cast, 10 episodes |
| 2010 | Sundays at Tiffany's | Hugh Morrison | TV movie |
| 2010 | Wright vs. Wrong | Darren | TV movie |
| 2012 | The Mentalist | Gabe Mancini | 2 episodes |
| 2013 | CSI: Crime Scene Investigation | Ivan Cafferty | Episode: "Double Fault" |
| 2013 | Body of Proof | Sergei Damanov | Episode: "Fallen Angel" |
| 2013 | Hidden Away | Andrew Bennett | TV movie |
| 2013–14 | Twisted | Jack Taylor | Recurring Cast |
| 2014–15 | Granite Flats | Roy Milligan | 7 episodes |
| 2015 | Castle | Cole Whitfield | Episode: "I, Witness" |
| 2015 | Eyewitness | Frank | TV movie |
| 2016 | NCIS: New Orleans | Agent John Russo | 3 episodes |
| 2016 | Mother, May I Sleep with Danger? | Teacher | Television film |
| 2019 | BH90210 | Nate | 5 episodes |

=== Other works ===
- 2002 – Rebellion (Director/Writer)
