= Matilda Awards =

Theater awards event

The Matilda Awards recognise excellence in cabaret, dance, theatre, and performance in southeast Queensland. The 38th edition was held at the Queensland Performing Arts Centre on 2 March 2026.

== History ==
Established in 1987 by Alison Cotes and Sue Gough, the awards are an annual event held in February or March. The awards are voted by a panel of industry personnel and critics and membership of the panel has changes over time.

In 2012 Silver and Gold Matilda statuettes were introduced, awarded for either a single work or a body of work over time. There were five Gold Awards each year but in 2015 only one was awarded as a result of industry advice.

In 2013 the Award for the Best Emerging Artist was changed to Bille Brown Award for Best Emerging Artist, named after the late actor.

At the 2015 awards co-founder Alison Cotes was farewelled after 25 years on the committee. She later wrote:

"In spite of many changes over its 29 year history, and the often bitter political rows about format and judges, the Matilda Awards are still going strong, and with the backing of Arts Queensland will continue to develop, even if they do annoy many people along the way and attract plenty of criticism."

At the 2015 awards the Gold Matilda was awarded posthumously to Carol Burns. She was renowned in Brisbane theatre and the audience responded with a standing ovation.

Over the years awards have been won by productions from many theatre companies including Aboriginal Centre for the Performing Arts, Fractal Theatre Company, Harvest Rain, Judith Wright Arts Centre, La Boite, Grin 'n' Tonic, little red company, Metro Arts, Monsters Appear, Oscar Theatre Company, Queensland Theatre Company (QTC), shake & stir, The Escapists, Wax Lyrical, and Zen Zen Zo Physical Theatre.

== Structure and Management ==
·Organization: Managed by a not-for-profit Executive Committee and supported by a Judging Committee of members chosen for their industry expertise.

·Judging: The judging panel evaluates theatre productions across a calendar year (January to December) based on published criteria. Two notable Lead Judges are Sue Rider and Paul Delit OAM.

·Categories: The Matilda Awards feature roughly 22 award categories, covering best mainstage production, independent production, directing, lighting, sound design, and acting.

Key Awards and Recognition

·The Gold Matilda: The highest honour awarded for an exceptional body of work, a standout production, or a major contribution to the industry.

·Bille Brown Award: Renamed in 2013, this award recognizes the Best Emerging Artist, honouring the legacy of the late actor Bille Brown.

== Hall of Fame ==
In 2011, the Matilda Awards created a Hall of Fame which recognises performers/craftsmen for a body of work. As of June 2017, the inductees were Sven Swenson, Sue Rider, Eugene Gilfedder, David Walters, Bill Haycock, Dale Ferguson, Andrew Buchanan, Caroline Kennison, Michael Futcher, Helen Howard, Greg Clarke, Hayden Spencer, Helen Cassidy, and Jennifer Flowers.

== Awards ==
Winners are listed on the Matilda Awards website.

Award	Winner	Award	Winner	Award	Winner
1988
Award Winner	Jennifer Flowers: performances Hedda Gabler, The Lady Aoi, Butts in the Borsht	Award Winner	Sue Rider: devising and directing The Matilda Women	Award Winner	Eugene Gilfedder: versatile contribution to theatre, musical composition and direction, performance Hamlet
Award Winner	Robert Arthur: directing Too Young For Ghosts, Hamlet	Award Winner	David Walters: lighting Les Liaisons Dangeureuses, The Sentimental Bloke, A Different Drummer	Commendation	Anna Pike: performance
Commendation	Sally McKenzie: performance	Commendation	Russell Kiefel: performance	Commendation	Bill Haycock: stage design
Commendation	Rick Billinghurst: directing	Commendation	Anthony Phelan: performance		
1989
Award Winner	David Brown: acting Romeo and Juliet, The Perfectionist	Award Winner	Jim Vilè: vital contribution to the enrichment of pro-am theatre in Brisbane	Award Winner	Rod Wissler: performance Who's Afraid of Virginia Woolf?
Award Winner	Mark Radvan: directing Equus	Commendation	Veronica Neave: performance as Juliet	Commendation	Ian Leigh-Cooper: solid contribution to Brisbane theatre as director and actor
Commendation	David Clendinning: extraordinary versatility in performance	Commendation	Christen O'Leary: refreshing new talent in Brisbane theatre The Threepenny Opera, Tokyo Rose	Commendation	Errol O'Neill: interpretation of The Christian Brothers
Special Commendation	Queensland Performing Arts Trust: The Soldier's Tale				
1990
Award Winner	David Clendinning: translating A Month In The Country, performances The Venetian Twins, Lost Weekend	Award Winner	Dale Ferguson: stage design Top Silk, A Month In The Country	Award Winner	Bill Haycock: stage design Legend, The Glass Menagerie, Brief Lives
Award Winner	Aubrey Mellor: contribution to the development of Queensland theatre	Award Winner	Anthony Phelan: performance A Month In The Country, Top Silk	Commendation	Beth Armstron : performance
Commendation	David Bell: directing	Commendation	Sally McKenzie: performance	Commendation	Veronica Neave: performance
Commendation	David Walter: lighting	Commendation	Rod Wissler: performance	Commendation	Joss McWilliam: - performance
Special Commendation	Queensland Performing Arts Trust: Legend				
1991
Award Winner	David Bell: directing The Game of Love and Chance, Bouncers	Award Winner	Aubrey Mellor: directing Money and Friends	Award Winner	Bryan Nason: artistic direction (Grin 'n' Tonic), directing Gilgamesh
Award Winner	Anthony Phelan: performance Essington Lewis I Am Work, The Game of Love and Chance	Award Winner	Sue Rider: directing Mrs Klein, devising and directing Dancing on the Walls Of Paris	Commendation	Charles Barry: performance
Commendation	Jennifer Flowers:: performance	Commendation	Eugene Gilfedder: performance	Commendation	Bill Haycock: stage design
Commendation	Sally McKenzie: performance	Commendation	Veronica Neave: performance	Commendation	Christen O'Leary: performance
Commendation	Seymour Productions: body of work	Special Commendation	Babette Stephens: a lifetime of service to Queensland theatre		
1992
Award Winner	Bille Brown: performance Twelfth Night	Award Winner	Jonathan Hardy: performance Twelfth Night	Award Winner	Jennifer Flowers: performance A Cheery Soul, Twelfth Night, Hotel Sorrento, directing The Idiot
Award Winner	Veronica Neave: performance Twelfth Night, The Idiot	Award Winner	David Berthold: directing The Heidi Chronicles, co-directing Hotel Sorrento	Commendation	Andrew Buchanan: performance The Adman
Commendation	Anthony Phelan: performance	Commendation	Peter Lamb: performance The Idiot	Commendation	Jennifer Blocksidge: performance
Commendation	David Walters: lighting	Commendation	Dale Ferguson (designer): stage design	Commendation	Bill Haycock: stage design
Special Commendation	John Kotzas and Queensland Performing Arts Trust Out of the Box	Special Commendation	La Boite Theatre: The Idiot		
1993
Award Winner	Brenna Lee-Cooney: establishment Fractal Theatre Company, directing The Orestaeia	Award Winner	Sue Rider: directing Vita!	Award Winner	Dale Ferguson: stage design Romeo & Juliet, The Shaughraun
Award Winner	Andrew Buchanan: performance Romeo & Juliet, Summer of the Aliens, The Waking Hour	Award Winner	Jonathan Hardy: performance Romeo & Juliet, The Shaughraun	Commendation	Angie Quick
Commendation	David Clendinning	Commendation	Eugene Gilfedder	Commendation	Caroline Kennison: performance Vita: A Fantasy
Commendation	Siobhan Lawless: performance Diving For Pearls	Special Commendation	David Bell, David Walters and Bill Haycock creating The Waking Hour for Queensland Performing Arts Trust		
1994
Award Winner	Andrew Buchanan: performance The Taming of the Shrew, Cosi	Award Winner	Michael Futcher: performance Grendel	Award Winner	Kevin Hides: performance Cosi, Cyrano de Bergerac
Award Winner	Caroline Kennison: performance Dancing at Lughnasa	Award Winner	Peter Lamb: performance Coriolanus, Theo An Illumination of the Life of Van Gogh	Highly Commended	Hilary Beaton: script No Strings Attached
Highly Commended	Irena Haze: performances Coriolanus, The Fall of the House of Usher, The Romance of Orpheus	Highly Commended	Charles Barry: performance The Taming of the Shrew	Highly Commended	Karen Crone: performances Cosi, No Strings Attached
Highly Commended	Leah Purcell: performance Low	Highly Commended	Christopher Morris: performance Low	Outstanding Contribution to the Local Scene	John Kotzas: artistic director Out of the Box
Outstanding Contribution to the Local Scene	Sue Rider: consistent high standards for la Boite theatre	Special Award for Services to the Qld Theatre Industry	Alan Edwards		
1995
Award Winner	Andrew Buchanan: performance Hamlet	Award Winner	John Batchelor: performance Christmas at Turkey Beach, Mill Fire	Award Winner	Elise Greig: performance Mill Fire, Honour
Award Winner	Philip Dean: script Long Gone Lonesome Cowgirls	Award Winner	Jacqui Carroll: leadership and direction Frank Theatre	Commendation	Gael Ballantyne: performance The Cavalcaders
Commendation	Deborah Mailman: performance The Seven Stages of Grieving	Commendation	Peter Lamb: performance	Commendation	Andrew McGahan: script Bait
Commendation	Liz Buchanan: performance Long Gone Lonesome Cowgirls	Commendation	Barbara Fordham: performance Long Gone Lonesome Cowgirls	Most Exciting Production	The Dark, Rock 'n' Roll Circus
Sustained Contribution to Queensland Theatre	Sean Mee: recognition 20 years in Queensland theatre	Special Commendation	Bryan Nason, Grin & Tonic Theatre Troupe and its repertory season of four Shakespeare plays	Special Commendation	Michael Futcher & Helen Howard Matrix Theatre
Special Commendation	Metro Arts, Experimetro programme				
1996
Award Winner	Caroline Kennison: performance Skylight, Simpatico	Award Winner	Jennifer Flowers: performance Supermarket Pavane	Award Winner	Glenn Francis: design Skylight, Love Child, There Goes The Neighbourhood, Supermarket Pavane, The Dreamers, Romeo& Juliet
Award Winner	Lewis Jones: direction Someone To Watch Over Me, Bouncers	Award Winner	Danny Murphy: Olenna, Abigail's Party, There Goes The Neighbourhood	Commendation	Michael Futcher
Commendation	Charles Barry	Commendation	Bill Haycock	Commendation	Rachel Konyi
Commendation	Matt Scott	Best Production	Sweeney Todd Queensland Theatre Company	Commended	Brisbane Festival's community programme for supporting and promoting local theatre
1997
Award Winner	Elaine Acworth: playwright Solitary Animals	Award Winner	John Batchelor: performance Sweet Phoebe, Oz Shorts	'Award Winner	Greg Clarke: design Oz Shorts
Award Winner	Paul Denny: performance Scar	Award Winner	Robyn Nevin: performance Masterclass, directing Summer Rain, After The Ball	Commendation	Anna Yen: writing, directing, performance
Commendation	Deborah Mailman: performance	Commendation	Lorraine Dalu: performance	Commendation	Elise Greig: performance
Commendation	Stephen Davis: writing	Commendation	Anthony Weigh: performance	Special Commendation	Wesley Enoch, services to indigenous theatre
Special Commendation	John Kotzas, Stage X Festival				
1998
Award Winner	Helen Howard & Michael Futcher: writing A Beautiful Life	Award Winner	Dale Ferguson (designer): design The Marriage of Figaro	Award Winner	David Brown: writing, directing Kill Everything You Love
Award Winner	Nicola Scott: performance Sweet Panic	Award Winner	Russell Dykstra: performance & writing Children of the Devil	Commendation	Margery Forde: writing X-Stacy
1999
Award Winner	Bille Brown: performance The Judas Kiss	Award Winner	Brenna Lee-Cooney: directing Decadence, Dracula	Award Winner	Wesley Enoch: books, lyrics, directing The Sunshine Club
Award Winner	Eugene Gilfedder: performance Decadence, The Tempest, Vertigo and The Virginia, Dracula	Award Winner	Kate Stewart: set design Hamlet, He Died With A Felafel In His Hand	Commendation	Angela Campbell: performance, directing, performance Vertigo and the Virginia
Commendation	Jennifer Flowers: performance Georgia	Commendation	Damien Garvey: performance The Big Picture	Commendation	Stephen Grives: performance Antigone
Commendation	Roxanne McDonald: performance Romeo and Juliet, Goin' To The Island, The Sunshine Club	Commendation	Jill Shearer: writing Georgia	Commendation	Kaye Stevenson: performance Hildegard
Special Award	Jim Vilè and Katie Williams, directing and producing Cathedrals Week	Special Award	Queensland Theatre Company, developing and producing The Sunshine Club by Wesley Enoch and John Rodgers		
2000
Award Winner	Julie Eckersley: performance The Secret Death of Salvador Dali, As You Like It	Award Winner	Mark Bromilow: directing Clark In Sarajevo	Award Winner	Margery & Michael Forde: writing Milo's Wake
Award Winner	Yalin Ozucelik: performance After January	Award Winner	Sean Mee: directing Box The Pony, performance Milo's Wake	Commendation	Stacey Callaghan: writing & performance When I Was A Boy
Commendation	Sarah Kennedy: performance Sylvia	Commendation	Geoff Squires: lighting Closer, Clark In Sarajevo, Redemption	Commendation	Lisa O'Neill: performance Three Frank Women, Rashamon
Commendation	Elizabeth Navratil: performance Ca Ca Courage	Commendation	Alison Ross: stage design The Secret Death Salvador Dali	Trust Award for Excellence	Leah Purcell: Box The Pony
Special Commendation	Sue Rider, for her sustained contribution to Queensland theatre; her development and presentation of new local and Australian work; her encouragement of Queensland Artistes; and her development of La Boite into a professional centre of excellence				
2001
Award Winner	Michael Dorman: performance 48 Shades of Brown	Award Winner	Elise Greig: performance Alive at Williamstown Pier, The Caucasian Chalk Circle, Secret Bridesmaids' Business	Award Winner	Helen Howard: performance Molly Sweeney
Award Winner	Matt Scott: lighting The Forest, Richard III, Love's Labour's Lost, Buried Child	Award Winner	Hayden Spencer: performance Small Mercies, Alive At Williamstown Pier, The Caucasian Circle, Buried Child	Commendation	Andrew Buchanan: directing Love's Labour's Lost, The Caucasian Chalk Circle, performance Love's Labour's Lost, Secret Bridesmaids' Business
Commendation	Damien Cassidy: performance The Pitchfork Disney	Commendation	Christine Johnston: devising, directing, performance Decent Spinster	Commendation	Jean-Marc Russ: directing 48 Shades of Brown, Rashamon, performance Fred
Commendation	Sven Swenson: writing In Lieu of Flowers	Commendation	David Walters: lighting Molly Sweeney	Special Commendation	Michael Gow and Queensland Theatre Company, promoting local writing in their groundbreaking production of Dirt
MEAA Best Emerging Artist	Michael Dorman	In Memory of Ashley Wilkie, A Special One-off Award for Outstanding Contribution to Theatre Public Relations	Rosemary Herbert (Walker), La Boite Theatre	Backstage Award for Ongoing Excellence in Backstage Work (chosen by Brisbane theatre directors)	Tiffany Noake
The Actors Benevolent Fund Award for Long-time Commitment to Queensland Theatre	Leo Wockner	QPAT Award	Stephen Page: Bangarra Dance Company		
2002
Award Winner	Carol Burns: performance Bill and Mary, Bag O' Marbles, directing Road To Mecca	Award Winner	Greg Clarke: designs Dogs In The Roof productions Emma's Nose, Salt, Macbeth	Award Winner	Jon Halpin: directingThe Messiah, Bill and Mary, Bash
Award Winner	Bryan Nason: adaptation, directing, producing Monkey	Award Winner	David Walters: lighting Black Chicks Talking, Still Standing	Commendation	Eugene Gilfedder: performances My Love Had A Black Speed Stripe, Emma's Nose, Macbeth
Commendation	Alison Ross: designs Cooking With Elvis, Road To Mecca, Bash, Mad Hercules, The Holden Plays	Commendation	Jean-Marc Russ: performanceCooking With Elvis, The Messiah	Special Commendation	Sue Benner and Metro Arts, promoting local artists and producing consistently good work in the inaugural Metro Arts Year of Independents
Special Commendation	Queensland Theatre Company, supporting emerging artists through its inaugural repertory program, and for the excellent body of work by its ensemble of actors; Chris Beckey, Melinda Butel, Sarah Kennedy and Jason Klarwein	Special Commendation	Bryan Nason, his unparalleled contribution to Brisbane theatre - spanning five decades - through his company Grin 'n' Tonic Theatre Troupe	Trust Award for Excellence	Margery Forde, outstanding contribution to theatre in Queensland and Australia
Actors and Entertainers' Benevolent Fund (Qld) Inc. now the Alan Edwards Memorial Award for Lifetime Contribution to the Performing Art in Brisbane	Carol Burns	MEAA Awards Best Emerging Actor	Jason Klarwein		
2003
Award Winner	Paul Denny: performance A Day In The Death of Joe Egg, The Removalists	Award Winner	Bill Haycock: set design Half and Half	Award Winner	Caroline Kennison: performance A Day In The Death of Joe Egg, Cosi
Award Winner	Hayden Spencer: performances Half and Half, The Lonesome West	Award Winner	Sven Swenson: writing Road To The She-Devil's Salon	Commendation	Karen Crone: performance Cosi
Commendation	Linda Hassell: writing Post Office Rose	Commendation	Jason Klarwein: performance Half and Half	Commendation	Bryan Probets: performances The Lonesome West, Road To The She-Devil's Salon
Commendation	Jean-Marc Russ: directing A Conversation performance We Were Dancing	Commendation	Scott Witt:directingRoad To The She-Devil's Salon excellence in fight choreography	Special Commendation	Dawn Albinger, Artistic Direction of the Magdalena Australia Festival and work with Sacred Cow
Special Commendation	Una Hollingworth, ongoing contribution to costume design at Brisbane Arts Theatre	The Actors Benevolent Fund Alan Edwards Lifetime Achievement Award	Errol O'Neill	La Boite Backstage Award	Tony Marr
MEAA Emerging Artist Award	Bryan Probets	QPAC Award for Excellence to an Individual or Ensemble	Bryan Nason		
2004
Award Winner	Hayden Spencer	Award Winner	Melinda Butel	Award Winner	Caroline Kennison
Award Winner	Jean-Marc Russ	Award Winner	Bill Haycock	Best Male Actor in a Lead Role	Hayden Spencer: The Real Inspector Hound / Black Comedy, Eating Ice Cream With Your Eyes Closed
Best Female Actor in [Lead] Role	Melinda Butel: Proof	Best Female Actor in [Lead] Role	Caroline Kennison: Wit	Best Male Actor in a Supporting Role	Sandro Colarelli: The Odyssey, The Venetian Twins
Best Female Actor in a Supporting Role	Carita Farrer: Proof, The Venetian Twins	Best Director	Jean-Marc Russ: Eating Ice Cream With Your Eyes Closed	Best Design	Bill Haycock: The Odyssey
Best Sound Design	Brett Collery: God is a DJ	Best Lighting Design	David Walters: The Odyssey, Wicked Bodies	Best Production	Eating Ice Cream With Your Eyes Closed (QTC)
Alliance Award for Emerging Artist	Emily Tomlins	Backstage Award	Gayle MacGregor	Alan Edwards Lifetime Achievement Award	Kaye Stevenson
QPAC Award for Excellence in the Performing Arts	Bille Brown				
2005
The Interactive Theatre of Australia Award for Best Performance by a Male Actor in a Lead Role	Steven Grives: The Drowning Bride	The Interactive Theatre of Australia Award for Best Performance by a Female Actor in a Lead Role	Sarah Kennedy: Hitchcock Blonde	The Ben Parkinson Award for Best Performance by a Male Actor in a Supporting Role	Daniel Murphy: The Dance of Jeremiah
The Actors'Workshop Award for Performance by a Female Actor in a Supporting Role	Helen Cassidy: The Drowning Bride	The QUT Precincts Award for Best Director	Michael Futcher: The Drowning Bride	The Toadshow Award for Best Designer	Jonathan Oxlade: A Christmas Carol, The Dance of Jeremiah, Bitin' Back, Creche and Burn
The Booknook Award for Best Playwright	Helen Howard and Michael Futcher: The Drowning Bride	Queensland Performing Arts Centre Award	Gayle MacGregor: for Outstanding Contribution to Theatre Costume Design and Wardrobe Management	The MEAA Backstage Award	Anika Vilée
2006
Gold Matilda Award Winner	Margi Brown-Ash: performance The Knowing of Mary Poppins	Gold Matilda Award Winner	Brett Collery: sound design Away, Constance Drinkwater and the Final Days of Somerset	Gold Matilda Award Winner	Michael Gow: direction Away, Private Lives, Absurd Person Singular
Gold Matilda Award Winner	Robert Kemp: set Away, Private Lives	Gold Matilda Award Winner	Steven Tandy: performance Last Drinks	Best New Australian Work	New Royal Marcel Dorney
Best Actress	Barbara Lowing: Away	Best Supporting Actress	Helen Howard: Last Drinks	Best Supporting Actor	Lucas Stibbard: New Royal
Emerging Artist	Ross Balbuziente	Emerging Artist	Michael Balk	Emerging Artist	Dirk Hoult: Assassins
Emerging Artist	Christopher Sommers				
2007
Best New Australian Work	The Kursk Sasha Janowicz	Best Mainstage Production	The Narcissist (La Boite Theatre Company)	Best Mainstage Production	The Glass Menagerie (QTC)
Best Director	Michael Futcher: The Kursk	Best Actress	Helen Cassidy: The Glass Menagerie	Best Actor	Barry Otto: Heroes
Best Supporting Actress	Helen Cassidy: Post Office Rose	Best Supporting Actor	James Stewart: The Glass Menagerie	Best Newcomer	Jessica Veurman-Betts: Post Office Rose
Best Independent Production	The Kursk: (Metro Arts Independents)	Best Technical Design	David Walters: The Glass Menagerie	Best Musical Production	Tom Waits for No Man, Brisbane Cabaret Festival
Best Design	Greg Clarke: The Glass Menagerie				
2008
Best Mainstage Production	Anatomy Titus Fall of Rome (QTC)	Best Independent Production	Hoods (Real TV)	Best Direction	Michael Futcher: Rabbit Hole (QTC)
Best Direction	Michael Futcher: The Wishing Well (La Boite)	Best Actress in a Lead Role	Helen Howard: Rabbit Hole (QTC)	Best Actor in a Lead Role	Jean-Marc Russ: I am my own wife (QTC)
Best Actress in a Supporting Role	Kaye Stevenson: Summer of the Seventeenth Doll (La Boite)	Best Actor in a Supporting Role	Andrew Buchanan: Female of the Species (QTC)	Best New Australian Work	Attack of the Attacking Attackers: Matthew Ryan
Best Emerging Artist	Kathryn Marquet: Jane Eyre, Bronte, Risk	Best Design	Jonathon Oxlade: Attack of the Attacking Attackers (La Boite)	Best Technical Design	David Walters: August Moon (QTC)
Best Musical Production	The 25th Annual Putnam County Spelling Bee (Oscar Theatre Co.)				
2009					
Matilda Awards Winner	Michael Gow; Richard Jordan; Metro Arts; Michelle Miall; Sven Swenson	Matilda Awards Winner	Richard Jordan	Matilda Awards Winner	Metro Arts
Matilda Awards Winner	Michelle Miall	Matilda Awards Winner	Sven Swenson	Best New Australian Play	25 Down: Richard Jordan (QTC)
Best Independent Production	The Tempest - in the raw (Zen Zen Zo Physical Theatre)	Best Mainstage Production	The Crucible (QTC)	Best Director	Michelle Miall: The Pillowman (QTC)
Best Actor in a Lead Role	Steven Rooke: The Pillowman (QTC)	Best Actress in a Main Role	Stace Callaghan: The White Earth	Best Actor in a Supporting Role	Chris Vernon: The Pillowman (QTC)
Best Actress in a Supporting Role	Andrea Moor: The Crucible	Best Designer	Jaxzyn (Jen Jackson): video design - The Pineapple Queen	Best Emerging Artist	Michelle Miall: The Pillowman (QTC)
2010
Matilda Award Winner	Leon Cain for his performance in I Love You, Bro	Matilda Award Winner	The Escapists for devising and producing boy girl wall	Matilda Award Winner	Eugene Gilfedder for his body of performance work in 2010 including Grimm Tales, Hamlet and The Chairs
Matilda Award Winner	Leah Purcell for her artistic direction of the Aboriginal Centre for the Performing Arts and directing and acting in The Story of the Miracles at Cookies Table	Matilda Award Winner	David Berthold for his repositioning of La Boite and directingHamlet and I Love You, Bro	Best Mainstage Production	Hamlet (La Boite)
Best Independent Production	boy girl wall (The Escapists at Metro)	Best Direction	Michael Futcher: Grimm Tales	Best Female Actor in a Lead Role	Leah Purcell: The Story of The Miracles at Cookie's Table
Best Male Actor in a Lead Role	Leon Cain in I Love You, Bro	Best Female Actor in a Supporting Role	Melanie Zanetti: The Little Dog Laughed	Best Male Actor in Supporting Role	Dan Crestani: Grimm Tales''
Best New Australian Work	The Bitterling by Sven Swenson	Best Emerging Artist	Amy Ingram: (acting) Fat Pig and Single Admissions	Best Design (Set, lighting, sound or costume)	Greg Clarke (design) on Grimm Tales
2011
Matilda Award Winner	Simone de Haas for her artistic direction of Mixed Company and commitment to producing quality self-funded independent theatre across three decades, including directing, designing and acting in its body of work	Matilda Award Winner	Steven Rooke for his outstanding body of performance work in 2011, including No Man's Land, Julius Caesar and The Removalists	Matilda Award Winner	Josh McIntosh for his prolific body of work for independent theatre companies in 2011, including shake & stir's Animal Farm and set and costume designs for Harvest Rain
Matilda Award Winner	Marcel Dorney for his accomplishment as a playwright in researching and rendering the script of Fractions	Matilda Award Winner	Melanie Zanetti for her radiant performance as Eliza Doolittle in Pygmalion	Best Mainstage Production	Pygmalion (QTC)
Best Independent Production	Animal Farm (Shake & Stir)	Best Independent Production	Amadeus (4MBS Festival of Classics)	Best New Play	Fractions by Marcel Dorney
Best Musical	Cabaret (Zen Zen Zo Physical Theatre)	Best Director	Michael Futcher Animal Farm	Best Director	Michael Gow No Man's Land
Best Male Actor in a Leading Role	Paul Bishop: Edward Gant's Amazing Feats of Loneliness	Best Male Actor in a Supporting Role	Steven Rooke: No Man's Land	Best Female Actor in a Leading Role	Melanie Zanetti: Pygmalion
Best Female Actor in a Supporting Role	Carol Burns: Cat on a Hot Tin Roof	Best Emerging Artist	Anna McGahan: Julius Caesar	Best Design (Set, lighting, sound or costume)	Renee Mulder: (set design) Edward Gant's Amazing Feats of Loneliness
2012
Gold Matilda Award Winner	Bryan Probets	Gold Matilda Award Winner	Simone Romaniuk	Gold Matilda Award Winner	Helen Howard
Gold Matilda Award Winner	David Walters	Gold Matilda Award Winner	Margi Brown Ash	Silver Matilda Best Mainstage Production	Kelly (QTC)
Best New Australian Work	A Tribute of Sorts: Benjamin Schostakowski	Best Independent Production	A Tribute of Sorts (La Boite & Monsters Appear)	Best Male Actor in a Leading Role	Dash Kruck: A Tribute of Sorts
Best Female Actor in a Leading Role	Emily Curtin: A Tribute of Sorts	Best Male Actor in a Supporting Role	Bryan Probets: As You Like It	Best Female Actor in a Supporting Role	Louise Brehmer: Thérèse Raquin
Best Female Actor in a Supporting Role	Luisa Prosser: Thérèse Raquin	Best Director	Helen Howard: Thérèse Raquin	Best Design	Simone Romaniuk: Kelly
Best Emerging Artist	Lizzie Ballinger: Thérèse Raquin				
2013
Gold Matilda Award	Barbara Lowing for performances in The China Incident, Tequila Mockingbird, and Motherland	Gold Matilda Award	Jason Glenwright for lighting Rumour Has It, Sixty Minutes Inside Adele, Out Damn Snot, Blood Brothers, Oklahoma!, Next to Normal, and Tequila Mockingbird	Gold Matilda Award	Andrea Moor for directing Venus in Fur
Gold Matilda Award	shake & stir theatre co. for creating Tequila Mockingbird	Gold Matilda Award	Christen O’Leary for her performance in End of the Rainbow	Best Mainstage Production	Tequila Mockingbird (shake + stir and QPAC)
Best New Australian Work	1001 Nights Michael Futcher and Helen Howard (adapters)	Best Independent Production	Motherland Metro Arts and Ellen Belloo	Best Male Actor in a Leading Role	Dan Crestani: 1001 Nights
Best Female Actor in a Leading Role	Libby Munro: Venus in Fur	Best Male Actor in a Supporting Role	Hayden Spencer: End of the Rainbow	Best Female Actor in a Supporting Role	Louise Brehmer: A Midsummer Night's Dream
Best Director	Michael Futcher: 1001 Nights	Best Design (Set and Costumes)	Angel Kosch, costume design, A Midsummer Night's Dream	Silver Matilda Best Technical Design (Ligting, Multimedia, Sound Design)	Phil Slade, musical director, 1001 Nights
Bille Brown award for Best Emerging Artist	Sandra Carluccio, creator, This Is Capital City	Best Musical or Cabaret	Rumour Has It: 60 Minutes Inside Adele Judith Wright Centre and the little red company		
2014
Gold Matilda Award	Steven Mitchell Wright for directing A Doll's House and directing/designing Caligula	Gold Matilda Award	Tim O'Connor for realising a new vision for Harvest Rain	Gold Matilda Award	optikal bloc for projection and video work on Pale Blue Dot, The Mountaintop, Wuthering Heights, Gasp! and 1984
Gold Matilda Award	Simone Romaniuk for designing Macbeth and Australia Day	Gold Matilda Award	Sven Swenson for co-producing, writing and acting in Angel Gear and Dangerfield Park	Best Mainstage Production	Gloria (QTC)
Best New Australian Work - Lord Mayors Award)	Richard Jordan: Machina	Best Independent Production	Angel Gear (La Boite Indie & Pentimento Productions with the support of QPAC)	Best Male Actor in a Leading Role	Sven Swenson: Angel Gear
Silver Matilda Best Female Actor in a Leading Role	Helen Christinson: A Doll's House	Best Male Actor in a Supporting Role	Damien Cassidy: A Doll's House	Best Female Actor in a Supporting Role	Cienda McNamara: A Doll's House
Best Director	Steven Mitchell Wright: A Doll's House	Best Design (Set and Costumes)	Simone Romaniuk: Macbeth	Best Technical Design (Lighting, Multimedia, Sound Design)	optikal bloc: Pale Blue Dot
Bille Brown award for Best Emerging Artist	Casey Woods: Angel Gear	Best Musical or Cabaret	Spamalot: (Harvest Rain Theatre Company)		
2015
Gold Matilda Award	Carol Burns for an outstanding performance in Happy Days, and also to celebrate an exceptional body of work	Best Mainstage Production	Brisbane (QTC)	Best Independent Production	The Pillowman (Shock Therapy Productions in partnership with Brisbane Powerhouse)
Best Male Actor in a Leading Role	Dash Kruck: Brisbane	Best Female Actor in a Leading Role	Libby Munro: Grounded	Best Male Actor in a Supporting Role	Tama Matheson: The Pillowman
Best Female Actor in a Supporting Role	Naomi Price: Ladies in Black	Best Director	Sam Foster: The Pillowman	Silver Matilda Best Design (Set and Costumes)'	Josh McIntosh: set design - Dracula
Best Technical Design (Lighting, Multimedia, Sound Design)	Jason Glenwright: lighting design - Dracula	Best New Australian Work - Lord Mayors Award)	Brisbane: Matthew Ryan	Bille Brown award for Best Emerging Artist	Georgina Hopson: Pirates of Penzance & Into the Woods
Best Musical or Cabaret	I Might Take My Shirt Off (QPAC in association with QLD Cabaret Festival, Jai Higgs & Dash Kruck)	Hall of Fame	Sven Swenson		
2016
Gold Matilda Award	Dead Puppet Society celebrating their exceptional body of work	Best Mainstage Production	Switzerland (QTC)	Best Independent Production	Viral (Shock Therapy Productions)
Best Male Actor	Matthew Backer: Switzerland	Best Female Actor	Andrea Moor: Switzerland	Best Male Actor in a Supporting Role	Julian Curtis: True West
Best Female Actor in a Supporting Role	Emily Weir: Tartuffe	Best Director	David Morton: The Wider Earth	Best Set Design	Leah Shelton:Terror Australis
Best Lighting Design	Jason Glenwright: Carrie: The Musical	Best Costume Design	David Morton & Aaron Barton:The Wider Earth	Best Sound Design / Composition	Tony Brumpton (Sound Design), Lior & Tony Buchen (Composition) The Wider Earth
Best Audio Visual Design	Justin Harrison (AV Design) & Anna Straker (Illustration):The Wider Earth	Best New Australian Work - Brisbane City Council)	Bastard Territory: Bastard Territory	Bille Brown award for Best Emerging Artist	Emily Weir:Tartuffe
Best Musical or Cabaret	Carrie: The Musical (Brisbane Powerhouse and Wax Lyrical Productions)				
2017
Gold Matilda Award	Playlab	Best Mainstage Production	Blue Bones (Playlab in partnership with Brisbane Powerhouse)	Best Independent Production	The Forwards (Shock Therapy Productions, Zeal & Brisbane Powerhouse)
Best Male Actor	Colin Smith, An Octoroon (Queensland Theatre & Brisbane Festival)	Best Female Actor	Merlynn Tong, Blue Bones (Playlab in partnership with Brisbane Powerhouse)	Best Male Actor in a Supporting Role	Anthony Standish, An Octoroon (Queensland Theatre & Brisbane Festival)
Best Female Actor in a Supporting Role	Elise Greig, Swallow (EG & Metro Arts) and Helen O'Leary, Swallow (EG & Metro Arts)	Best Director	Ian Lawson, Blue Bones (Playlab in partnership with Brisbane Powerhouse)	Best Set Design	Josh McIntosh, American Idiot (shake & stir theatre co & QPAC)
Best Lighting Design	David Walters, Blue Bones (Playlab in partnership with Brisbane Powerhouse)	Best Costume Design	GUSH: Bianca Mackail, Mayu Muto, Celia White & Anna Yen, Monsteria (GUSH, Vulcana Women's Circus & Brisbane Powerhouse)	Best Sound Design / Composition	Tony Brumpton & Sam Cromack (Ball Park Music), Laser Beak Man (Dead Puppet Society, Brisbane Festival & La Boite)
Best Audio Visual Design	Nathan Sibthorpe, Blue Bones (Playlab in partnership with Brisbane Powerhouse)	Best New Australian Work - Brisbane City Council)	Blue Bones, by Merlynn Tong	Bille Brown award for Best Emerging Artist	Meg Bowden, The Winter's Tale (Queensland Shakespeare Ensemble)
Best Musical or Cabaret	American Idiot (shake & stir theatre co and QPAC)				
2018
Gold Matilda Award	Debase Productions	Best Mainstage Production	Prize Fighter (La Boite & Brisbane Festival) and The Longest Minute (Jute, Debase and Queensland Theatre)	Best Independent Production	The Sound of a Finished Kiss, Now Look Here and Electric Moon
Best Male Actor	Paul Bishop, Poison	Best Female Actor	Noni Hazlehurst, Mother	Best Male Actor in a Supporting Role	Jackson McGovern, The Owl and the Pussycat
Best Female Actor in a Supporting Role	Andrea Moor, Hedda	Best Director	Natano Fa’anana and Bridget Boyle, We Live Here	Best Set Design	Josh McIntosh, A Christmas Carol
Best Lighting Design	David Walters, Nearer the Gods	Best Costume Design	Penny Challen, The Owl and the Pussycat	Best Sound Design / Composition	Babushka, Happily Ever After
Best Audio Visual Design	No award	Best New Australian Work - Brisbane City Council)	Crunch Time, Counterpilot	Bille Brown award for Best Emerging Artist	Carly Skelton, The Hatpin
Best Musical or Cabaret	The Sound of a Finished Kiss, Now Look Here and Electric Moon in partnership with Brisbane Powerhouse	Lifetime Achievement	Rosemary Walker		
2019
Gold Matilda Award	Shake & Stir	Best Mainstage Production	Death of a Salesman, Queensland Theatre	Best Independent Production	La Silhouette, Sui Ensemble
Best Male Actor	Richard Lund, Kelly	Best Female Actor	Amy Ingram, Cinderella	Best Male Actor in a Supporting Role	Thomas Larkin, Death of a Salesman
Best Female Actor in a Supporting Role	Susie French, Girl's Guide to World War	Best Director	Daniel Evans, Cinderella	Best Set Design	Josh McIntosh, Revolting Rhymes and Dirty Beasts
Best Lighting Design	Geoff Squires, Inside Out	Best Costume Design	Libby McDonnell, Orpheus and Eurydice	Best Sound Design / Composition	Luke Smiles and Anna Whitaker, Throttle
Best Video Design	Craig Wilkinson (video) and Jon Weber (illustrations), Fantastic Mr Fox	Best New Australian Work – Brisbane City Council)	Girl's Guide to World War, Katy Forde (book and lyrics) and Aleathea Monsour (composer)	Bille Brown award for the Best Emerging Artist	Gina Tay Limpus, The Tempest and La Silhouette
Best Musical or Cabaret	Fangirls, Queensland Theatre and Belvoir in association with ATYP				
