= Andrea Moor =

Australian actress

Andrea Moor is an actor based in Brisbane, Queensland, Australia. She is known for with roles in theatre, film and television. She is also a stage director and coordinator of actor training at QUT (Queensland University of Technology).

== Early career to mid-2000s ==
Moor was born in Melbourne, raised in Queensland and moved to Sydney in 1979. At 19 she travelled to London to study at East 15 and returned to Sydney after a year. She enrolled at the National Institute of Dramatic Art (NIDA) and graduated in 1985.

She appeared in productions by all the major Sydney theatre companies including, Sydney Theatre Company, Ensemble Theatre, Stables Theatre, Marion Street Theatre and Belvoir. She travelled to England with the Sydney Theatre Company production of David Williamson's play Emerald City.

Moor was also appearing in films and on television including 59 episodes in the series Heartbreak High. She was also at times listed as Andrea Moore.

== Career ==
Moor's parents were residents of Brisbane, and following her father's death she moved back to Brisbane with her family to be closer to her mother.

She subsequently appeared in many productions for Brisbane-based theatre companies La Boite and Queensland Theatre Company.

While continuing as an actor Moor moved into directing from 2007 as an assistant director. In late 2008 she had her first role as director with the production of Beautiful at the Loft. She directed plays for the Queensland Theatre Company and in 2014–2015 was appointed a Resident Director – a joint position with Jason Klarwein. The role included "working on a range of projects from mainstage productions to works in development, youth programs and repertoire meetings." For the second half of 2015 Moor's role moved to being Artistic Associate. Of the role of director Moor said, "While I love directing, and still find it incredibly challenging, at my heart I'm an actor."

== Teaching ==
Moor had studied at the Atlantic Theatre Company in New York City, the acting school founded by David Mamet and William H Macy, which uses a technique known as Practical Aesthetics, the Atlantic Technique.

Moor introduced this technique to Australia in 1994 and in 1998 she together with Melissa Bruder established “the official Sydney Annex of the NYC.” She has run workshops on the technique at NIDA, Western Australian Academy of Performing Arts (WAAPA), Queensland University of Technology (QUT), London Academy of Music and Dramatic Art (LAMDA), and Practical Aesthetics Australia (PAA) and in group settings.

She had been offered teaching roles in institutions but wanted to investigate further on techniques to teach acting. In 2013 she was awarded her PhD as a Doctorate of Creative Industries. Her thesis was entitled "Contemporary Actor Training in Australia: A comparative survey of the efficacy of the acting methodologies implemented at four leading Australian actor-training institutions - National Institute of Dramatic Art, Queensland University of Technology, Victorian College of the Arts, and Western Australian Academy of Performing Arts." She then accepted a five-year role as senior lecturer and head of acting at Queensland University of Technology.

Moor describes her career as "reinventing myself or adding strings to my bow just in order to survive." She said that the combination of acting, directing and teaching will not lead to a secure financial future where she would have sufficient money to retire while a permanent teaching position offers more financial stability. Her studies had the unexpected advantage of giving her greater insight into her own work as an actor and director. She is on the boards of Queensland Theatre (formerly Queensland Theatre Company) and Metro Arts.

In 2014 she was awarded a Churchill Fellowship. In her submission she wrote, "The purpose of this fellowship was to enlighten me as to current theatre practice in with particular focus on the work of outstanding female theatre directors, in order to enrich and challenge my own practice as theatre director and provide a benchmark for reflection of my own practice."

== Review acting ==
Maureen Strugnell in a review in Stage Diary wrote of Moor's performance in Vincent in Brixton as the mother of Vincent Van Gogh,

Andrea Moor is compelling in this role, suggesting by everything she does the effort that it takes to keep on functioning in a world that has lost all meaning. Whether she is rushing manically about the kitchen as in the opening scene, or moving with achingly painful slowness as the depression takes hold again, we watch fascinated. When she sits still, head in hands, she personifies despair and prefigures later portraits by Van Gogh of sorrowing women.

== Awards ==
2005 nominated Matilda Awards The Actors' Workshop Awards for Performance by a Female Actor in a Supporting Role : Vincent in Brixton
2007 nominated Matilda Awards Best Actress : Who's Afraid of Virginia Woolf?
2008 nominated Matilda Awards Best Actress in a Lead Role : The Narcissist
2009 winner Matilda Awards Best Actress in a Supporting Role : The Crucible
2013 winner Gold Matilda Award for directing Venus in Fur
2013 nominated Matilda Awards Best Director Venus in Fur
2015 nominated Matilda Awards Best Director : Grounded
2016 winner Matilda Awards Best Female Actor : Switzerland

== Personal life ==
Moor lives in Ashgrove Brisbane with her husband and their teenage daughter Bella.

== Theatre (selected) ==
=== As actor ===
Year	Title	Venue
1984 (NIDA Training)	Holiday Makers	NIDA Theatre
1984 (NIDA Training)	All's Well That Ends Well	NIDA Theatre
1985 (NIDA Training)	Chamber Music	NIDA Theatre
1985 (NIDA Training)	The Greeks Play 1 The War	Parade Theatre
1985 (NIDA Training)	Once in a Lifetime	Parade Theatre
1986	Away	Stables Theatre
1986	The Bitter Tears of Petra von Kant	Wharf Theatre
1986–87	Emerald City	Sydney Opera House, Playhouse Adelaide, Canberra Theatre Centre
1987	Woman in Mind	Sydney Opera House with Sydney Theatre Company
1987–88	Emerald City	Sydney Opera House with Sydney Theatre Company
1988	The Game of Love and Chance	Wharf Theatre with Sydney Theatre Company
1988	An Ideal Husband	Wharf Theatre with Sydney Theatre Company
1988	Emerald City	Lyric Theatre, Charing Cross, London with Sydney Theatre Company
1990	Siren	Wharf Theatre with Sydney Theatre Company
1990	Crystal Clear	Universal Theatre
1991	Witchplay	Stables Theatre
1992	A Little Like Drowning	Belvoir Street Theatre
1993	The Old Boy	Ensemble Theatre
1993	Titus Andronicus	Wharf Theatre with Sydney Theatre Company
1993	The Newspaper of Claremont Street	Marian Street Theatre
1993	The Visit	Sydney Opera House with Sydney Theatre Company
1994	Furious	The Space, Adelaide, Malthouse Theatre with Sydney Theatre Company
1994	The Gun in History	Stables Theatre (Griffin Theatre Company)
1993	Barefoot	Stables Theatre (Griffin Theatre Company)
1994	Flame	Stables Theatre (Griffin Theatre Company)
1995	The Ninth Step	Ensemble Theatre
1995	Rosencrantz and Guildenstern are Dead	Belvoir Street Theatre
1996	The Family	Ensemble Theatre
2001	Borderlines	Stables Theatre (Griffin Theatre Company)
2004	Myth Propaganda and Disaster	Stables Theatre (Griffin Theatre Company)
2005	Vincent in Brixton	Cremorne Theatre with Queensland Theatre Company
2005	Bitin' Back	Cremorne Theatre with Jdarra Indigenous Performing Arts
2006	Absurd Person Singular	Cremorne Theatre with Queensland Theatre Company
2007	The Narcissist	Roundhouse Theatre with La Boite Theatre Company
2007	Who's Afraid of Virginia Woolf?	Cremorne Theatre with Queensland Theatre Company
2008	The Narcissist	Roundhouse Theatre, Sydney Opera House, Illawarra Performing Arts Centre, Jetty Memorial Theatre Coffs Harbour with La Boite Theatre Company
2009	The Crucible	Playhouse, South Bank with Queensland Theatre Company
2010	Let the Sunshine	Cremorne Theatre with Queensland Theatre Company
2010	Tender	Sue Benner Theatre (and Moor Theatre)
2011	An Oak Tree	Bille Brown Studio with Queensland Theatre Company
2011	Pygmalion	Playhouse, South Bank with Queensland Theatre Company
2012	Romeo & Juliet	Playhouse, South Bank with Queensland Theatre Company
2013	Design for Living	Playhouse, South Bank with Queensland Theatre Company
2016	Switzerland	Bille Brown Studio with Queensland Theatre Company

=== As director ===
Year	Title	Role	Venue
2007	Red Cap	Assistant Director	Roundhouse Theatre with La Boite Theatre Company
2008	The Ghost Writer	Director	Metro Arts Theatre (and Moor Theatre)
2008	Heroes	Assistant Director	Playhouse Canberra; Lismore City Hall with Queensland Theatre Company
2008	Beautiful	Director	The Loft, Kelvin Grove (and Moor Theatre)
2009	My Night with Harold	Director	Metro Arts Warehouse, Brisbane
2009	The Tempest		USQ
2010	Tender	Director & Actor	Metro Arts Warehouse, Brisbane (and moor theatre)
2011	Water Falling Down	Director	Cremorne Theatre with Queensland Theatre Company
2012	Intimacy	Director	JUTE Theatre, Cairns
2013	Venus in Fur	Director	Cremorne Theatre with Queensland Theatre Company
2014	Australia Day	Director	Playhouse, South Brisbane with Queensland Theatre Company
2015	Boston Marriage	Director	Queensland tour with Queensland Theatre Company
2015	Grounded	Director	Diane Cilento Studio with Queensland Theatre Company
2016	Boston Marriage	Director	Queensland tour with Queensland Theatre Company

== Filmography ==
=== Film ===
Title	Year	Role	Type
1987	Travelling North	Joan	Feature film
1992	Over the Hill	Jan (as Andrea Moore)	Feature film
1993	Excursion to the Bridge of Friendship	Maria (as Andrea Moore)	Film short
1996	Shooting the Breeze	Greta	Film short
1997	Oscar and Lucinda	Miss Shaddock	Feature film
1999	Strange Planet	Dating Agency Woman	Feature film
2001	The Man Who Sued God	Maxine Jeffrey	Feature film
2005	Cool	Nurse Josephine	Film short
2008	Bitter & Twisted	Pauline Praline (as Andrea Moore)	Feature film
2009	Subdivision	Woman (as Andrea Moore)	Feature film
2010	Life	Mother	Film short
2012	Mental	Barry Supporter	Feature film
2013	Return to Nim's Island	Minister O'Hare	Feature film
2018	Follow My Way	Genevieve	Film short
2018	Road Train	Victoria	Film short
2022	Elvis	Nurse Trish	Feature film
2022	Mistletoe Ranch	Ivy	Feature film
2023	A Royal In Paradise	Queen Patricia	Feature film

=== Television ===
Title	Year	Role	Type
1987	Army Wives	Ros	TV film
1988; 1992	A Country Practice	Christine Warner	TV series, 2 episodes
1991; 1992	The Flying Doctors	Teacher	TV series, 1 episode
1991	Sex	Doctor	TV special
1992	A Country Practice	Sarah Wild (as Andrea Moore)	TV series, 2 episodes
1992	The Flying Doctors	Jane McLaughlin	TV series, season 9, 1 episode
1992	The Distant Home	Forbes (as Andrea Moore)	TV film
1993	G.P.	Marilyn Delaney	TV series, 1 episode
1994–99	Heartbreak High	Di Barnett / Greta Stewart	TV series, 59 episodes
1995	Good Morning Australia	Guest	TV series, 1 episode
1999	Water Rats	Priscilla Conway	TV series, 1 episode
1999	Airtight	Elsa Conrad	TV film
1999; 2003	All Saints	Liz Thomas	TV series, 2 episodes
2002	White Collar Blue	Dr. Andrews (as Andrea Moore)	TV series, 1 episode
2002; 2005	Home and Away	Anna McMann	TV series, 1 episode
2003	All Saints	Alana Devlin	TV series, 1 episode
2004	The Movie Show	Herself	TV series, 1 episode
2005	Home and Away	Mrs McPhee	TV series, 1 episode
2006	Mortified	Miss Barnett (as Andrea Moor)	TV series, 1 episode
2006–07	H2O: Just Add Water	Mrs Geddes	TV series, 3 episodes
2018	Safe Harbour	AFP Officer Matera	TV miniseries, 2 episodes
2020	The End	Dr. Charters	TV series, 1 episode
2021	Harrow	Pat Vale	TV series, 1 episode
2021	Sunshadow	Meredith O'Toole / Eva Marinella	Podcast series, 7 episodes
2022	True Colours	Kristin / Katrin	TV series, 2 episodes
2022	Darby and Joan	Guest role: Gina	TV series, episode 3
2022	Greenlit	Jessica	TV miniseries
2023	In Our Blood	Guest role: Margaret	TV series, 1 episode
2026	Deadloch	Diane	1 episode (2.4)
