= Todd MacDonald =

Canadian Australian actor (born 1973)

- Born: 1973 (age 52–53); British Columbia, Canada
- Education: Gold Coast Little Theatre; National Institute of Dramatic Art (NIDA) (1996)
- Occupation: Actor
- Years active: 1992–present
- Known for: Neighbours; The Secret Life of Us; Rush
- Spouse: Rebecca McIntosh
- Children: 2

Todd MacDonald (born 1973) is a Canadian Australian actor who is best known for his roles on the soap opera Neighbours and the drama series The Secret Life of Us and Rush.

== Early life ==
MacDonald and his older brother Paul were born in British Columbia to a Canadian father Deryle, who met their mother Margret, a former air hostess, while he was working in Australia. When MacDonald was seven years old, the family back-packed across Europe, before moving to Queensland, Australia.

He developed an interest in acting while in primary school on the Gold Coast, and took classes at Gold Coast Little Theatre. He played Ham in a production of Samuel Beckett's Endgame in his high school senior year. He graduated from the National Institute of Dramatic Art (NIDA) in 1996.

== Career ==
After several minor roles, MacDonald secured a bigger role in the 1995 television film Sahara, which was shot in Sydney. He considered the film his "big break", but he was out of work for a number of months afterward. MacDonald attended an audition for television soap opera Neighbours in 1996 and was cast as Darren Stark, the son of Cheryl Stark (Caroline Gillmer). He relocated to Melbourne from Sydney for filming. The role of Darren had previously been played by Scott Major briefly in 1993. MacDonald departed the series in 1998, returning for guest appearances in 2004 and 2005, and again in 2007 and 2008.

In the early 2000s, MacDonald played the recurring role of Nathan Lieberman on The Secret Life of Us, which was one of his favourite roles. He stated "at the time the show was doing something entirely new which was a such a joy to be a part of." He appeared in the 2004 miniseries Salem's Lot, and had a supporting role in the drama series Rush in 2008. He has also appeared in BeastMaster, Blue Heelers, and feature film The Jammed.

In 2013, he appeared as Thomas with Libby Munro as Vanda in a production of David Ives' 2010 play Venus in Fur by the Queensland Theatre Company in Brisbane.

MacDonald was co-founder and artistic director of The Store Room Theatre in Melbourne in 1999. He went on to become an artistic associate of the Queensland Theatre Company from 2011 to 2014, and CEO and artistic director of La Boite Theatre Company in Brisbane, from 2015 until 2020.

In 2024, MacDonald appeared in the television film A Vintage Christmas as Mayor Mitchell.

== Personal life ==
MacDonald is married to Queensland performer Rebecca McIntosh, whom he met while she was hosting Love TV at the Edinburgh Festival. They have twin daughters.

== Filmography ==
Television
Year	Title	Role	Notes
1995	Sahara	Mike Clarkson	Television film
1996–1998, 2004–2005, 2007–2008	Neighbours	Darren Stark	Series regular
2000	Virtual Nightmare	Bob	Television film
2000	On the Beach	Radioman Giles	Television film
2001	BeastMaster	Breon	Episode: "The Crystal Ark"
2001–2003	The Secret Life of Us	Nathan Lieberman	Recurring
2001	Blue Heelers	Snr Constable Simon Barclay	Episode: "Letter of the Law"
2004	Salem's Lot	Floyd Tibbits	Miniseries
2005	Blue Heelers	Brendan Maguire	Recurring
2007	The King	Richard Croft	Television film
2008	Rush	Connor Barry	Recurring
2009	Snake Tales		
2009–2010	Satisfaction	Bernie	Recurring
2010	Tangle	Paul	Recurring
2011	Bed of Roses	Conrad	Episode: "Laid Bare"
2019	The Family Law	Ross	Episode: "Dancing in the Dark"
2022	Darby and Joan	Nick	Episode 1.3

Film
Year	Title	Role	Notes
1997	Bum Magnet	Judd	Short film
2001	Martin Four	Martin	Short film
2002	The Thing in the Roof	Willie	Short film
2002	Guru Wayne	David Fisher	Feature film
2007	The Jammed	Tom	Feature film
2008	Belladonna	Luke	Feature film
2009	Welcome to the Cosmos	Rob	Short film
2010	Don't Be Afraid of the Dark	Creature (voice)	Feature film
2010	The Pier	Joel	Short film
2021	Thea Goes to Town	Hal	Short film
2024	Audrey	Ranch Hand	Feature film
2024	A Vintage Christmas	Mayor Mitchell	

== Theatre ==
=== As actor ===
Year	Title	Role	Venue / Company
1992	Summer of the Aliens	Lewis	NIDA Parade Theatre
1992	Hanjo	Actor	NIDA Parade Theatre
1993	The Skin of Our Teeth	Actor	NIDA Parade Theatre
1993	The Grace of Mary Traverse	Lord Exrake / Guard	NIDA Parade Theatre
1993	All's Well That Ends Well	Actor	NIDA Parade Theatre
1993	A House is Built	William	NIDA Parade Theatre
1994	The Art of Success	Actor	NIDA Parade Theatre
1994	The Adding Machine	Actor	NIDA Parade Theatre
1994	Appetite	Actor	Fairfax Studio, Melbourne, with NIDA for Melbourne Fringe Festival
1996	Venus and Adonis	Actor	State Theatrette, Sydney for Sydney Gay and Lesbian Mardi Gras
1999	The Language of the Gods	Theo Braak	Malthouse Theatre, Melbourne, with Playbox Theatre Company
1999	Remembrance Day	Performer	Victorian Trades Hall with La Mama, Melbourne
2002	Screaming in America: The Bill Hicks Project	Actor	Store Room, Melbourne, for Melbourne International Comedy Festival
2003	Ride	Actor	Store Room, Melbourne
2004	Julia 3	Charlie	Malthouse Theatre, Melbourne, with Playbox Theatre Company
2004; 2006	Blowback	Actor	St Kilda Army & Navy Club Memorial Hall, Melbourne, with NYID, Sydney Opera House
2005; 2007	Construction of the Human Heart	'Him'	Store Room, Melbourne, Tower Theatre, Melbourne, Belvoir Theatre, Sydney, Frankston Arts Centre, Colac Otways Performing Arts &Cultural Centre
2007	Make Me Cry	Actor	Fortyfivedownstairs, Melbourne
2008	Lovers and Haters	Actor	Norwood Concert Hall for Adelaide Festival
2008	The Dispossessed	Performer	Seoul Arts Centre, South Korea
2008; 2009	Strangeland	Performer	Seoul Arts Centre, South Korea, Arts House Meat Market, Melbourne
2009	Progress and Melancholy	Actor	Fortyfivedownstairs, Melbourne
2010	Bare Witness	Jacek	Fortyfivedownstairs, Melbourne, with La Mama
2013	Venus in Fur	Thomas	Cremorne Theatre with Queensland Theatre Company
2014	The Button Event	One Man Show	Bille Brown Studio with Queensland Theatre for Brisbane Festival
2015; 2016	Uncle Vanya	Dr Astrov	Watford House, Avoca, Corinella Eganstown with La Mama
2016	The Tragedy of King Richard III	Shakespeare	Roundhouse Theatre, Brisbane, with La Boite Theatre Company
2018	The Mathematics of Longing	Physicist father	Roundhouse Theatre, Brisbane, with La Boite Theatre Company

=== As director ===
Year	Title	Role	Venue / Company
2004	The Conquest of the South Pole	Director	The Store Room, Melbourne
2007	Top Town	Director	Melbourne Town Hall for Melbourne International Comedy Festival
2007	Scenes from our Loungeroom	Director	Northcote Town Hall, Melbourne, for Melbourne International Comedy Festival
2007	Cinderella Sux	Director	Meeting Room, Melbourne for Melbourne Fringe Festival
2009	The Dictionary of Imaginary Places	Producer	Arts House, Meat Market with The Store Room, Melbourne
2011	An Oak Tree	Director	Bille Brown Theatre with Queensland Theatre
2012; 2015	Kelly	Director	Cremorne Theatre, Brisbane, Gasworks Theatre, Melbourne, Butter Factory Theatre, Wodonga with Queensland Theatre
2014	The Mountaintop	Director	Playhouse, Brisbane with Queensland Theatre
2015	Medea	Director	Roundhouse Theatre, Brisbane, with La Boite Theatre Company
2015; 2017; 2018	Prize Fighter	Director	Roundhouse Theatre, Brisbane, Belvoir Street Theatre, Sydney, Logan Entertainment Centre, Northcote Town Hall, Melbourne, IMB Theatre, Wollongong with La Boite Theatre Company
2016	When One Door Closes	Dramaturge	Roundhouse Theatre, Brisbane, with La Boite Theatre Company
2016	A Streetcar Named Desire	Director	Roundhouse Theatre, Brisbane, with La Boite Theatre Company
2017	Blackrock	Director	Roundhouse Theatre, Brisbane, with La Boite Theatre Company & QUT
2017; 2018	The Village	Director	Roundhouse Theatre, Brisbane, with La Boite Theatre Company
2017; 2020	Laser Beak Man	Dramaturge	Roundhouse Theatre with La Boite Theatre Company for Brisbane Festival, Sydney Opera House for Sydney Festival
2018	The Mathematics of Longing	Creator	Roundhouse Theatre, Brisbane, with La Boite Theatre Company
2019	Single Asian Female		Roundhouse Theatre, Brisbane, with La Boite Theatre Company
2019	Romeo and Juliet	Director	Roundhouse Theatre, Brisbane, with La Boite Theatre Company
2020	The Neighbourhood	Creator	Roundhouse Theatre, Brisbane, with La Boite Theatre Company
