= Matthew Ryan (writer) =

Australian playwright, theatre director, and screenwriter

- Born: Australia
- Occupations: Playwright, theatre director and screenwriter
- Website: matthewryan.net.au

Matthew Ryan is an Australian playwright, theatre director and screenwriter.

== Early life ==
Ryan's family had a hobby farm at Shepparton in Victoria and he spent some of his childhood living there. The farm was not far from Glenrowan where the Ned Kelly shootout occurred and his 2012 his play Kelly looks at the myth and the legend of Ned Kelly.

He attended Somerset College on the Gold Coast and says, "I loved Drama in high school. For me it was a real escape from teenage life. I had a wonderful drama teacher at Somerset College ... who cared so much about the Arts." He continued to act in theatre on the Gold Coast after leaving school.

== Writing ==
Talking about the beginnings of his writing career Ryan said,

After I moved to Brisbane I was looking for the sort of plays I wanted to be in. Then I realised the things I wanted to be in hadn’t been written. It started at the University of Queensland with a crazy student production I co-wrote and co-directed. I loved it so much I started writing my new play straight after the first one. It took me another seven years to get a work on the professional main stage (at La Boite) but I was committed to achieving it.

== Career ==
Matthew Ryan has written and co-written a number of plays which have been performed by professional theatre companies including La Boite Theatre Company, Queensland Theatre Company (QTC), Hothouse Theatre and Melbourne Theatre Company. He has been nominated and won awards for his plays and several are available in print including Brisbane, Boy Girl Wall, Kelly, Summer Wonderland, The Harbinger and The Dance of Jeremiah. His book Plays from the Top of the Stairs, Vol, 1 was written for use in the classroom where students can work in groups. Its target age is 8 to 15 years and it was developed through work with the Backbone Youth Arts.

He is a co-founder with Jonathon Oxlade, Lucas Stibbard and Neridah Waters of independent theatre-making group The Escapists.

His play Boy Girl Wall toured from August 2011 to September 2012 through Queensland, Victoria, New South Wales, Western Australia, Northern Territory, Australian Capital Territory and Tasmania.

The Harbinger toured from August to October 2014 through Queensland, Victoria, New South Wales Western Australia, Northern Territory, and ACT.

Kelly toured Australia nationally from March to July 2015.

== Awards ==
2000 George Landen Dann Award Winner (The Dance of Jeremiah)

2005 Matilda Awards nominated for the Book Nook Award for Best Playwright (The Dance of Jeremiah)

2007 Matilda Awards nominated for Best New Australian Work (Summer Wonderland)

2008 Matilda Awards Winner for Best New Australian Work (Attack of the Attacking Attackers)

2010 Matilda Awards Winner for The Escapists for Best Independent Production (Boy Girl Wall)

2010 Matilda Awards nominated for Best New Australian Work (Boy Girl Wall )

2010 Screen Queensland joint winner The Writers’ Room

2012 Matilda Awards nominated for Best New Australian Work (Kelly)

2015 Matilda Awards Winner The Lord Mayor's Award for Best New Australian Work (Brisbane)

2015 Helpmann Awards shortlisted Best Regional Touring Production (Kelly)

2017 ScreenCraft Drama Screenplay Contest (Los Angeles) Semi-finalist (Goodbye My Enemy)

2017 ScreenCraft Action & Thriller Screenplay Contest (Los Angeles) Grand Prize Winner (Get It Together)

== Works ==
First Performed	Title	Venue	First Performed	Title	Venue
1998	So You Die a Little (co-writer Tony Brockman)	Cement Box Theatre, University of Queensland (Pandemonium Theatre)	2005	The Dance of Jeremiah	Roundhouse Theatre, Kelvin Grove (La Boite)
2007	Summer Wonderland	Roundhouse Theatre, Kelvin Grove (La Boite)	2009	Boy Girl Wall (co-writer Lucas Stibbard)	Sue Benner Theatre, Brisbane (The Escapists/Metro Arts)
2011	The Harbinger (co-writer David Morton)	Roundhouse Theatre, Kelvin Grove (La Boite)	2012	Kelly	Cremorne Theatre, South Brisbane (QTC)
2014	Packed (co-writer Lucas Stibbard)	The Butter Factory Theatre, Wodonga (The Escapists/HotHouse Theatre)	2015	Brisbane	Playhouse, South Bank (QTC)

== Other Theatrical Work ==
First Performed	Title	Venue
2008	Attack of the Attacking Attackers (Adaptor)	Roundhouse Theatre, Kelvin Grove (La Boite)
2011	Sacre Bleu (Adaptor)	Cremorne Theatre, South Brisbane (QTC)
