= Alan Edwards (actor) =

British-Australian actor (1925–2003)

- Born: Alan Edmund William Edwards; 17 January 1925; United Kingdom
- Died: 14 January 2003 (aged 77); Brisbane, Queensland, Australia
- Education: Royal Academy of Dramatic Art
- Occupations: Actor, artistic director
- Years active: 1951-2003

Alan Edmund William Edwards AM MBE (17 January 1925 – 14 January 2003) was a British actor and founding artistic director of the Queensland Theatre Company in Brisbane, Queensland, Australia.

He was considered a major contributor to the artistic life of Queensland and was appointed MBE (Member of the Order of the British Empire) and Member of the Order of Australia for his services to theatre. He was also made an honorary Doctor of Letters by the University of Southern Queensland.

== Early life and education ==
Alan Edmund William Edwards was born in the UK on 17 January 1925. He first went to school in Egypt, as his father, who was in the British Army, was stationed there.

Having decided that he wanted to be an actor, he won a scholarship to the Royal Academy of Dramatic Art (RADA), and graduated in 1944 with a diploma in acting.

During World War II, Edwards joined the Royal Warwickshire Regiment, attaining the rank of Captain. He was put in charge of the British Forces Broadcasting Service in Nairobi, Kenya, where he also organised a garrison theatre.

After the war, he won a scholarship to the Old Vic Theatre School, located in The Cut, London. After graduation, he joined The Young Vic, which was a branch of the Old Vic and the first home of the Royal National Theatre under Laurence Olivier.

== Career ==
After completing his training, he worked in various repertory theatres in England and Scotland before joining the Birmingham Repertory Theatre under Sir Barry Jackson for two years.

From 1956, he worked mainly in London in film, theatre and radio for about eight years. During this time, he also taught at RADA, the Central School of Speech and Drama, the Rose Bruford College, and Toynbee Hall.

In 1958 he played Roger Cuttance in two episodes of The Diary of Samuel Pepys.

In 1960, he appeared in the British films, The Unstoppable Man, as the Station Constable, and The Gentle Trap, as Al Jenkins.

In 1962 he co-founded TEAMWORK, a management company which presented revues in London, Oxford, and at the Edinburgh International Festival's fringe in 1963.

In 1964 he left England and started teaching at the National Institute of Dramatic Art in Sydney. During his time in Sydney he also played roles for the Old Tote Theatre and at the Theatre Royal in Hobart, Tasmania. He also appeared on ABC Television and radio, and various commercial stations.

After responding to an advertisement posted internationally, Edwards flew to Brisbane on 15 July 1969 to interview for the post of artistic director of the first state theatre company in Queensland, Queensland Theatre Company (QTC), and was appointed before he flew home. During his time in the role, he helped to establish the career of future star Geoffrey Rush as well as Bille Brown, Carol Burns and many others. He was artistic director of QTC from 1970 to 1988, when he was succeeded by Aubrey Mellor.

Edwards served on the Theatre Board of the Australia Council and was also chairman of the steering committee which brought into being the Confederation of Australian Performing Arts (CAPPA) and later served as its vice-chairman. He was a board member of the Queensland Performing Arts Trust for 10 years, inaugural president of the Actors' & Entertainers' Benevolent Fund (Qld) Inc., patron of the Queensland Theatre of the Deaf, a Member of the Immigration Review Panel (Queensland), and a justice of the peace.

As the founding director of the Queensland Theatre Company Edwards made many appearances with the company, and was acclaimed for his performances in such roles as Salieri in Amadeus, The Psychiatrist in Equus, Professor Higgins in Pygmalion, Dr Alfred Feldman in Duet For One, and The Chorus in Henry V. Other roles have included Judge Don Gusman in The Marriage of Figaro, Baptista in The Taming of the Shrew for Queensland Ballet, Cicero in Julius Caesar, Sir Peter Teazle in The School For Scandal, Richard Noakes in Arcadia and Mr Diagilsmith in Tightrope. Edwards also appeared in a variety of roles with companies including Sydney Theatre Company, Northside Theatre Company, Phillip Street Productions, La Boite Theatre, The House is Live, Opera Queensland, Queensland Performing Arts Trust, and Seymour Productions.

As a Director some of his favourite productions were the musicals Annie and Hello Dolly!, Blithe Spirit, Henry V, Long Days Journey into Night and Caravan.

Edwards' final appearance was as part of The Way We Were in the Playhouse Theatre at the Queensland Performing Arts Complex, a special performance that looked back and saluted the rich arts and entertainment history and performers of Queensland.

== Recognition and awards ==
In 1982 Edwards received the Advance Australia Award for his contribution to theatre.

In 1983, he was made a Member of the British Empire by Elizabeth II for his valuable contribution to the advancement of Queensland’s cultural life, and in the same year was a finalist in the Queenslander of the Year Award.

In 1990 he was appointed a Member of the Order of Australia in the Australia Day Honours List in recognition of service to the performing arts.

In 1994 Edwards was a recipient of a Brisbane Theatre Critics' Matilda Award. In 1997 he received The Glugs of Gosh Award for Excellence in Theatre and in 1998 he was awarded a Doctorate of Letters (honoris causa) by the University of Southern Queensland.

== Death and legacy ==
Edwards died of cancer in Brisbane on 14 January 2003.

Aside from founding the Queensland Theatre Company, Edwards also founded the charity Actors' & Entertainers' Benevolent Fund of Queensland in 1975, and he was the inaugural president of the organisation. Edwards served in that role until 1994.
