= Jason Klarwein =

Indigenous Australian actor and director

Jason Klarwein (born c.1976) is an Australian actor, director, producer and artistic director, known for his involvement with Grin & Tonic theatre troupe.

== Early life ==
Klarwein born was born around 1976.

== Career ==
In 1996 Klarwein began his professional career with a performance of The Glass Cage and became a part of the company of Zen Zen Zo Physical Theatre during the period 1996 to 1999. In 2002 he was in the inaugural intake of artists in the Queensland Theatre Company's Emerging Artists Program and received a Matilda Special Commendation as part of that ensemble of actors. That same year he was the winner of the Matilda Awards MEAA Award for Best Emerging Actor. He has had roles in several Queensland Theatre Company productions and La Boite Theatre Company.

He moved interstate and his role at the Belvoir in Capricornia under director Wesley Enoch was the precursor of a later association at Queensland Theatre Company, where Enoch became Artistic Director and Klarwein featured as an actor in many of his productions and became resident director.

In 2009 he worked with the Sydney Theatre Company production of A Streetcar Named Desire. The play was directed by Liv Ullmann and starred Cate Blanchett and toured Washington and New York City.

In 2014-2015 he was appointed the Resident Director with Andrea Moor at Queensland Theatre Company .

In 2017 he starred in Once in Royal David's City in a joint production between Black Swan Theatre Company and Queensland Theatre Company. He was nominated for Best Male Actor in the 2017 Helpmann Awards.

in 2017 a revamped version of The 7 Stages of Grieving toured a number of venues. The play, which is more than 20 years old, was written by Wesley Enoch, a playwright and artistic director, and Deborah Mailman, an actress; both are Indigenous Australians. This production stars the Indigenous actress Chenoa Deemal, and is directed by Klarwein. The play was a production of Queensland Theatre and Grin & Tonic Theatre Troupe. A review in The Australian cited on the Gardens Theatre, QUT said,

Ten seconds into Jason Klarwein's magnificent new production of The 7 Stages of Grieving, and you're hooked by the sense of history. Humble, decent and engaging, Deemal is the personification of the play's inclusive message: that what drives superficial anger is, in reality, an enduring sense of grief.

== Almeida Shakespeare project and Macbeth ==
Renowned Shakespearen director Michael Attenborough visited Australia in 2007 in a collaboration between London's Almeida Theatre, the Sydney Theatre Company and the Bundanon Trust arts complex in Shoalhaven." Jessica Boyd, the granddaughter of artist Arthur Boyd who bequeathed the Shoalhaven property to the nation, approached Attenborough who brought four actors from the United Kingdom to work with five actors from Australia. Sydney Theatre Company artistic director Robyn Nevin chose Klarwein from auditions and work she had seen him perform elsewhere,

Our aim was to choose those we thought would most probably gain from the opportunity to work with a director like Michael - he has such specific knowledge of Shakespeare, having worked with the RSC Royal Shakespeare Company for such a long time. He is steeped in the traditions of Shakespearean language, and he brings that love and passion for Shakespeare with him.

Attenborough finished his stint as artistic director of the Almeida Theatre in London in 2012 and contacted Klarwein in regard to his coming to Brisbane to stage a production.

In 2014 the Queensland Government's $3 million Super Star Fund allowed the Queensland Theatre Company to bring Attenborough to Brisbane to direct a three week season of Macbeth starring Klarwein as Macbeth.

Reviews of Klarwein performance included, in Stage Whispers, "Jason Klarwein (Macbeth) and Veronica Neave (Lady Macbeth) dominated the stage" and from Aussie Theatre, "Jason Klarwein in the title role, portrayed the many facets of this complex character with charisma, strength, as well as vulnerability. The chemistry between Klarwein and Veronica Neave as Lady Macbeth was palpable."

== Grin & Tonic theatre troupe ==
Klarwien was an associate member of Grin & Tonic theatre troupe, which tours throughout Queensland and spends several months each year playing lively Shakespeare programs for secondary students, for over 15 years. In 2010 he became artistic director of the troupe. Grin & Tonic present shows which include Shakespeare aimed at primary and secondary school children. They explore issues which fit into the school curriculum and offer workshops for those seeking a career in some aspect of theatre.

== Awards ==
- Matilda Awards
- 2002 Matilda Special Commendation for excellent body of work as part of the ensemble of actors in the emerging artists inaugural repertory program Queensland Theatre Company
- 2002 Matilda Awards Winner MEAA Award Best Emerging Actor
- 2003 Matilda Awards Commendation for performance in Half and Half
- 2003 Matilda Awards nominated Best Male in a Lead Role God is a DJ
- 2017 Helpmann Awards nominated for Best Male Actor in a Play Once in Royal David's City

== Memberships ==
He is the elected representative (one of two) for Queensland on the National Performers Committee which meets to discuss issues affecting all performers.

MEAA Board - Queensland Branch Board Member

== Reviews ==
=== Acting ===
In a review of Once in Royal David's City, (2017) Caroline Russo wrote, " ... an exceptional ensemble cast led by acclaimed Brisbane force of the stage Jason Klarwein" and in the Sydney Morning Herald review of Fractions (2011) Sommer Tothill wrote, "Jason Klarwein as supremely zealous antagonist Kyril takes a little time to settle into the role, but at full steam he transforms into a viscerally terrifying power-hungry fanatic."

In his role in The Seagull (2015) Sonny Clarke wrote that it was "played with deep, heartfelt conflict by Klarwein" and his review of Design for Living (2013) stated, "Klarwein seems to exist rather than act his role and with the mischievous Matheson and easily-led Lazarus to bounce off – the three provide a lively comedic yet pathetic and exciting mess of a peer group" .

His performance in Elizabeth, almost by chance a woman for the QTC (2012), " ... is a total revelation as Egerton, the Queen’s minister and would-be assassin. He demonstrates a lovely comic ability, full of variety; self-aware and expressive."

=== Direction ===
Much Ado about Nothing (2016) was reviewed in Arts Review with the following comments,

Making his mainstage directorial debut, Jason Klarwein promises romantic sparring at its Shakespearean best ... After working closely with globally acclaimed Shakespearean specialist director Michael Attenborough and acting in many applauded productions, Jason Klarwein is the perfect lens through which to deliver Much Ado About Nothing in this most important of years.

Alison Cotes in her review of The 7 Stages of Grieving wrote in 2015:, "The text is flawless, the actor close to perfection, but what brings this play into the 21st century after 20 years, and redeems it from being just a period piece, is the direction and the staging ... especially director Jason Klarwein ... this becomes a team effort".

== Theatre ==
=== Jason Klarwein as actor ===
Year	Title	Venue	Year	Title	Venue
1996 (1-28 Dec) (Disabled Arts)	The Glass Cage	Cremorne Theatre, South Brisbane	1998 (31 Aug-5 Sep) (Zen Zen Zo Physical Theatre)	Zen Zen Zo: Steel Flesh (Performer)	Merivale Street Studio, South Brisbane (Zen Zen Zo Physical Theatre)
1999 (22 May-12 Jun)	Macbeth: As Told by the Weird Sisters (Performer)	Princess Theatre, Woolloongabba (Zen Zen Zo Physical Theatre)	2001 (1-27 Oct)	Richard II	Brisbane Powerhouse, New Farm (Qld Theatre Co.)
2002 (3 May-22 Jun)	Mad Hercules	Bille Brown Studio, Brisbane (Qld Theatre Co.)	2002 (9 Sep-5 Oct)	The Fortunes of Richard Mahony	Brisbane Powerhouse, New Farm (Qld Theatre Co./Playbox)
002 (1-26 Oct)	The Fortunes of Richard Mahony	Merlyn Theatre, Southbank, VIC (Qld Theatre Co./Playbox)	2002 (11-29 Mar)	Half and Half	La Boite Theatre, Milton (La Boite Theatre Co.)
2004 (20 Sep-16 Oct)	God is a DJ	Bille Brown Studio, Brisbane (Qld Theatre Co.)	2005 (13-22 Oct)	A Thing Called Snake	The Space, Adelaide (Adelaide Festival Centre)
2006 (1-26 Oct)	A Streetcar Named Desire	Playhouse, South Bank (Qld Theatre Co.)	2006 (27 May-2 Jul)	Capricornia	York Theatre, Chippendale (Company B Belvoir)
2007 (21 Feb-10 Mar)	The Chicken Play or Marmalade and Egg	JUTE Theatre, Cairns	2005 (28 Apr-3 Jun)	Paul	Belvoir Street Theatre, Surry Hills (Company B Belvoir)
2009 (1 Sep-17 Oct)	A Streetcar Named Desire	Sydney Theatre, Millers Point, NSW (Sydney Theatre Co.)	2009 (30 Oct-21 Nov)	A Streetcar Named Desire	The John F Kennedy Center for the Performing Arts, Washington (Sydney Theatre Co.)
2009 (27 Nov-20 Dec)	A Streetcar Named Desire	Brooklyn Academy of Music, Fort Greene, New York (Sydney Theatre Co.)	2010 (15 Mar-10 Apr)	Thom Pain (Based on Nothing)	Bille Brown Studio, Brisbane (Qld Theatre Co.)
2010 (7-12 Sep)	Macbeth	QUT Festival Theatre, New Farm (Qld Theatre Co.)	2011 (Apr/May)	An Oak Tee(Guest Performer)	Bille Brown Studio, Brisbane (Qld Theatre Co.)
2011 (11 Jun-30 Jul)	Faustus	Brisbane Powerhouse, Playhouse (Sydney Opera House), Illawarra Performing Arts Centre (Qld Theatre Co./Bell Shakespeare Co,)	2011 (14 Oct-10 Dec)	Fractions	Cremorne Theatre, South Brisbane (Qld Theatre Co./HotHouse Theatre)
2012 (21-31 Mar)	Fractions	The Butter Factory Theatre, Wodonga (Qld Theatre Co./HotHouse Theatre)	2013 (23 Feb-26 Apr)	Henry 4	ACT, Melbourne, WA, Opera House (Bell Shakespeare Co.)
2013 (19 Oct-10 Nov)	Design for Living	Playhouse, South Bank (Qld Theatre Co.)	2014 (22 Mar-13 Apr)	Macbeth	Playhouse, South Bank (Qld Theatre Co.)
2015 (29 Aug-26 Sep)	The Seagull	Playhouse, South Bank (Qld Theatre Co.)	2014 (17 Oct-8 Nov)	The Odd Couple	QPAC, South Bank (Qld Theatre Co.)
2017 (25 Mar-9 Apr)	Once in Royal David's City	Heath Ledger Theatre, Northbridge, WA (Qld Theatre Co./Black Swan Theatre Co.)	2017 (22 Apr-14 May)	Once in Royal David's City	Playhouse, South Bank (Qld Theatre Co./Black Swan Theatre Co.)

=== Jason Klarwein as director/writer/creator ===
Year	Title	Venue	Year	Title	Venue
2014 (3-5 Jul)	Warning: Small Parts (Writer)	The Butter Factory Theatre, Wodonga (HotHouse Theatre/Grin & Tonic)	2015 (17-31 Mar)	The 7 Stages of Grieving (Director)	ACT, Melbourne, WA, Opera House (Grin & Tonic/Qld Theatre Co.)
2015 (23 May-13 Jun)	Oedipus Doesn't Live Here Anymore (Director)	Playhouse, South Bank (Qld Theatre Co.)	2016 (23 Apr-15 May)	Much Ado About Nothing (Director)	Playhouse, South Bank (Qld Theatre Co.)
2015 (27 Aug-25 Sep)	St Mary's in Exile (Director)	Playhouse, South Bank (Qld Theatre Co.)	2017 (May-Jun)	The 7 Stages of Grieving	Gardens Theatre QUT;Sydney Opera House;Riverside Theatres, Parramatta
2017 (12-15 Jul)	My name is Jimi (Director/co-creator)	Centre Of Contemporary Arts, Cairns	2017 (22 July-13 Aug)	My name is Jimi (Director/co-creator)	Bille Brown Studio, Brisbane (Qld Theatre Co.)
2022 (10 Sept - 1 Oct)	Othello	Queensland Theatre			

== Film ==
Klarwein has appeared in several short films, including Bad Ass Mono-Winged Angel (2001), Nothing Much (2012) and Ruby (2016). He has also appeared in episodes of Cybergirl (2001), Sea Patrol (2011) and Slide (2011). He had a continuing role in the mini series Devil's Playground (2014) which won 5 awards from 10 nominations.
