= Dale Ferguson (designer) =

Australian theatrical scenic & costume designer

- Education: National Institute of Dramatic Art
- Known for: Scenic designer; Costume designer
- Awards: Green Room Awards; Matilda Awards

Dale Ferguson is an Australian theatrical scenic and costume designer who was nominated for the Tony Award for Best Costume Design, the Tony Award for Best Scenic Design, and the Drama Desk Award for Outstanding Set Design for the 2009 Broadway revival of Exit the King.

== Career ==
Ferguson graduated from the National Institute of Dramatic Art in Sydney in 1989. The following year he became resident designer for the Queensland Theatre Company, a post he held until 1994, after which he joined the Melbourne Theatre Company, remaining with them until 1998.

Ferguson's credits include The Marriage of Figaro, The Winter's Tale, And a Nightingale Sang, Twelfth Night, The Heidi Chronicles, and A Month in the Country for Queensland Theatre; The Resistible Rise of Arturo Ui, Amy's View, The Balcony, and Three Sisters for Melbourne Theatre; The Marriage of Figaro, Eugene Onegin, and Ariadne auf Naxos for Opera Australia and the Welsh National Opera; productions of The 25th Annual Putnam County Spelling Bee, Titanic, and The Rocky Horror Show in Sydney; productions of August: Osage County, The Seagull, and The History Boys in Melbourne; Antigone, Peribáñez and the Commander of Ocaña, and The Chairs for Company B; the 2008 Logie Awards for Nine Network Australia; and A Midsummer Night's Dream for the Houston Grand Opera.

Ferguson is the recipient of the 1996 and 1997 Green Room Award, presented by members of the Melbourne performing arts community, and the 1990, 1993, and 1998 Matilda Award, presented by Brisbane theatre critics.

== Awards and nominations ==
Association	Award	Year	Result
Green Room Awards		1996	Won
Green Room Awards		1997	Won
Matilda Awards		1990	Won
Matilda Awards		1993	Won
Matilda Awards		1998	Won
Tony Awards	Tony Award for Best Costume Design	?	Nominated
Tony Awards	Tony Award for Best Scenic Design		Nominated
Drama Desk Awards	Drama Desk Award for Outstanding Set Design		Nominated
