= Libby Munro =

Australian actress

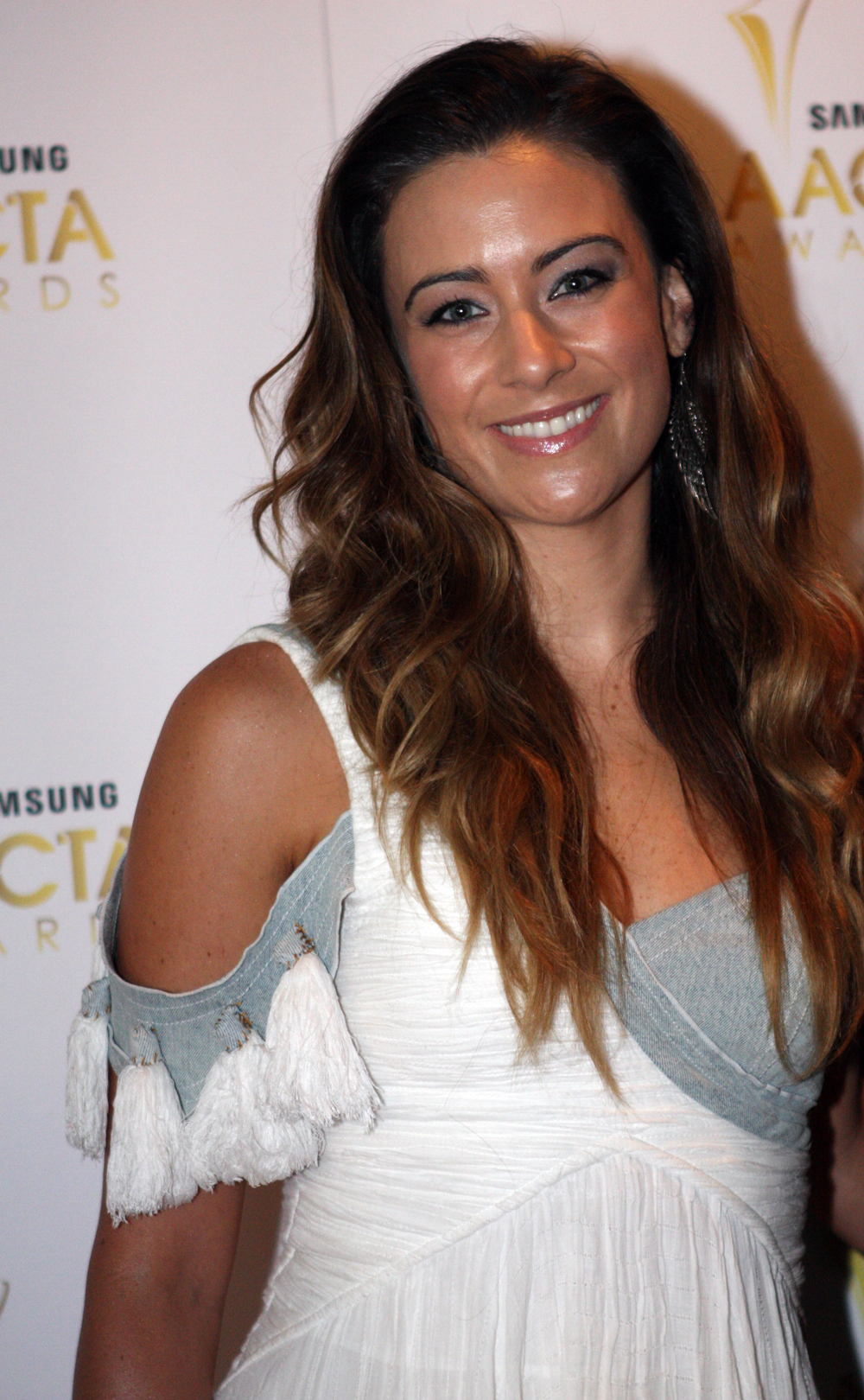
- Munro at the AACTA Awards, 2012
- Born: 11 November 1981 (age 45); Charleville, Queensland, Australia
- Occupation: Actress

Libby Munro (born 11 November 1981) is an Australian actress.

== Early life and education ==
Munro was born on a cattle station near Charleville, Queensland, before she moved with her family to a property west of Millmerran. She attended Fairholme College in Toowoomba where she became the school's drama captain. She attended The Women's College at University of Queensland and was appointed the cultural director. She appeared in many college productions, particularly of Shakespeare and Alan Ayckbourn plays. In 2004, she graduated from the Queensland University of Technology with a Bachelor of Business in Communications and in 2005 from The Performing Arts Conservatory Brisbane with an Advanced Diploma of Screen and Stage Acting. In 2008, she graduated from the National Institute of Dramatic Art. In 2011, she attended The Groundlings school of improvisational comedy, the Ivana Chubbuck studios, and Film Fighting LA, all in Los Angeles.

== Career ==
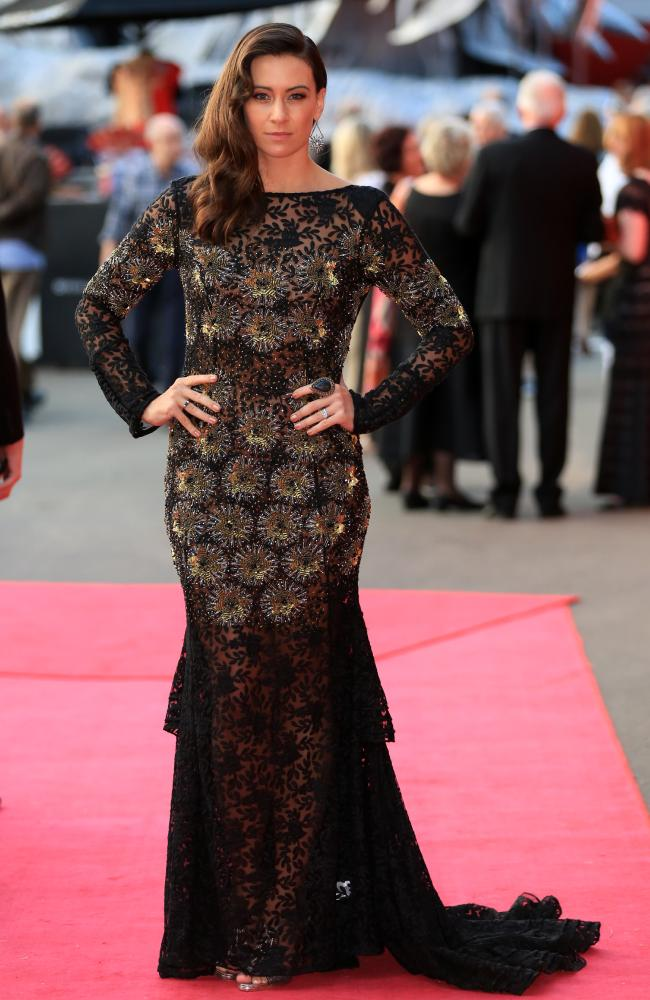
Munro at the premiere of Turandot on Sydney Harbour, March 2016

Munro worked at the Sydney Theatre Company, The Ensemble Theatre, Queensland Theatre Company and Melbourne Theatre Company. On television, she appeared in the series All Saints, Review with Myles Barlow, and Slide. Her breakthrough performance was her role of Vanda/Wanda in David Ives' play Venus in Fur for the Queensland Theatre Company in 2013. She was awarded the Matilda Award for Best Female actor in a Leading Role for her performance. Later that year, she appeared as Philippa Haymes in a theatrical adaptation of Agatha Christie's A Murder Is Announced for Mousetrap Production's Australian tour.

In 2016, Munro performed in the Pulitzer Prize winning play Disgraced by Ayad Akhtar in the role of Emily. She has been nominated for another Matilda Award for Best Female Actor in a Supporting Role.

Munro starred in the 82 minute one-shot feature film Eight, directed by Peter Blackburn. The independent film has won numerous awards at film festivals around the world including Best Film at Snowdance Filmfestival in Germany and Best Screenplay at the Independent Spirit Film Festival. Munro was featured in the "must see list of Oscar contenders" for the Atlanta Film Festival and also won Los Angeles Film Festival Best Film as well at the Jury Prize in Croatia.

== Filmography ==
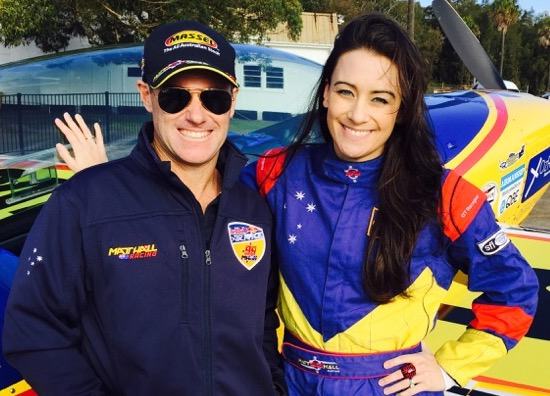
Munro with pilot Matt Hall who took her up in his Red Bull plane as research for her role in Grounded

=== Film and television ===
Year	Title	Role	Notes
2009	Review With Miles Barlow	Jenna	TV series (1 episode)
2009	All Saints	Senior Constable Rose Drago	TV series (2 episodes)
2011	Slide	Shazza	TV series (1 episode)
2011	The Bind	Carmen	Short
2013	Branded	Ash	Short
2014	Eight	Sarah Prentice	Feature film
2014	Hiding	Alana Pinder	TV series (2 episodes)
2015	Bullets for the Dead	Jessica Dalton	Feature film
2017	The Hunted	Violet	Short
2017	Wild Woman	Claire Cane	Feature film
2018	Prison House	Monica	Feature film
2019	The Unsettling	Vivian	Feature film
2019	Mommy Would Never Hurt You	Monica	TV film
2022	Troppo	Anita	TV series (3 episodes)
2022	Joe vs. Carole	Mary	TV series (1 episode)

=== Theatre ===
Year	Title	Role	Notes
2000	Picasso at the Lapin Agile	Freddy	College Players UQ
2001	Absurd Person Singular		Producer and director
2002	Bedroom Farce	Susannah	College Players UQ
2004	Ring Round the Moon	Diana Messerschmann	Centenary Theatre Group
2004	Cloud Nine	Victoria	The Actors Conservatory
2004	The Comedy of Errors	Adriana	The Actors Conservatory
2005	Closer to Heaven	Billie Trix	Brisbane Powerhouse
2005	Romeo and Juliet	Prince	Qld Shakespeare Festival
2005	Twelfth Night	Olivia	Qld Shakespeare Festival
2006	Private Lives	Amanda	
2006	Visions	Adelaide	
2006	Footprints	Bodyline	
2007	Macbeth	Witch 1, Seyton and The Porter	
2007	The Wood Demon	Yelena Andreyevna	
2007	Private Life of the Master Race	Lawyer, Lesbian Cabaret Singer	
2008	Servant of Two Masters	Carney	
2008	Gallipoli	Soldier / Prostitute	Sydney Theatre Company
2008	Days of Significance	Trish	
2009	24 Hour Play Generator	Roxanne	Griffin Stablemates Theatre
2011	The Collection	Stella	
2013	Betrayal	Emma	
2013	Venus in Fur	Vanda	Queensland Theatre Company
2013	A Murder Is Announced	Phillipa	Moustrap Productions
2015	Dream Home	Colette	The Ensemble Theatre
2015	Grounded	The Pilot	Queensland Theatre Company
2016	Disgraced	Emily	Melbourne Theatre Company
2017	Noises Off	Brooke Ashton/Vicki	Melbourne Theatre Company / Queensland Theatre coproduction
2021	Our Town	Mrs Gibbs	Queensland Theatre Company
2023	The Appleton Ladies Potato Race	Dr Penny Anderson	Queensland Theatre Company
2026	The Great Gatsby	Jordan Baker	Queensland Theatre Company and Shake & Stir Theatre Company
