= Emerald City (play) =

1987 play by David Williamson

- Original language: English
- Written by: David Williamson
- Subject: Entertainment industry
- Genre: Satire

Premiere
- Date: 1987

Emerald City is a 1987 play by the Australian playwright David Williamson, a satire about two entertainment industries: film and publishing. It is one of his most acclaimed works.

== Story ==
The plays centres on the Rogers family, loosely modelled on Williamson's own. They have recently moved from Melbourne to Sydney. Colin is Australia's most successful screenwriter (like Williamson), but currently down on his luck. He does not want to make what he perceives as a "movie of the week" about Tony Sanzari and an amusement park hijacking that is offered to him by his agent, Elaine Ross, but a story about the coastwatchers of the Second World War, because his uncle was one, and it was Australia's great contribution to the war. His wife, Kate, is a book editor and wants to publish a novel by the Aboriginal writer Kath Mitchell titled Black Rage, but her publisher, Ian Wall, says, "Blacks don't sell books." They have three children, Penny, who has been frequenting a disco called Downmarket; Hannah, whose teachers say is depressed; and Sam, whom Colin fears Kate is encouraging to be gay.

Colin teams with a womanising hack writer named Mike McCord to work on Coastwatchers, who hates the idea, but wants his name on the film as co-writer because it is an instant status boost in the industry, even though he is primarily just typing dictation. When he hears of Kate's problem, he prank calls Ian Wall, accuses him of racism, and threatens that a group of militants will mob the publishing house if he does not publish Black Rage.

Coastwatchers proves a ratings disaster, so Mike latches on to Colin for another project, a rip-off of Miami Vice set in Australia and loaded with Australianisms. Malcolm Bennett, who usually finances Colin's productions, advises him to get back with Elaine because his project is "shit". "So is Miami Vice," Colin responds. "That's classy shit," Malcolm tells him, "This is absolute shit." The difference is that the writers of Miami Vice are writing at the best of their abilities, while the fact that Colin is writing below his level is painfully obvious. During this time, Colin becomes attracted to Mike's girlfriend, Helen Davey, but ultimately draws the line in the friendship and avoids cheating on his wife.

Ultimately, Kath Mitchell is nominated for the Booker Prize, and Kate accompanies her and Ian Wall to the awards ceremony, though she does not win. Although Kate tells Colin that Ian looks like a "garden gnome" she admits to the audience (the play contains a great deal of direct to audience monologues) that she was unfaithful. A disillusioned Colin returns to Elaine Ross and accepts the project she offered him. Elaine calls Sydney "The Emerald city of Oz. Everyone comes here along their yellow brick roads looking for the answers to their problems and all they find are the demons within themselves."

The play takes many swipes at contemporary occurrences in the entertainment industry, such as Steven Spielberg's purchase of the Australian writer Thomas Keneally's novel, Schindler's Ark, which one character jokes will be made into a film in which the Jews are rescued by space aliens. At one point, Mike sums up the "great Australian novel", Henry Handel Richardson's The Fortunes of Richard Mahony, as, "Doctor's marriage goes bad, he goes to the goldfields, gets gangrene and dies", to which Kate says, "I don't think your synopsis quite does the book justice." To that, he simply dismisses it as a "downer".

== Major performances ==
=== Australia ===
The play was first performed in Australia in 1987 by the Sydney Theatre Company at the Drama Theatre of the Sydney Opera House. It was received with great success and won the Sydney Theatre Critics Award for Best Play. It toured seven cities of Australia, and produced numerous award-winning national revivals and tours.

==== Cast ====
- Garry McDonald as Colin
- Ruth Cracknell as Elaine
- Diane Craig as Kate
- Drew Forsythe as Mike
- Andrea Moor as Helen
- Dennis Grosvenor as Malcolm

=== New York ===
It was premiered in the United States off-Broadway by the New York Theatre Workshop at the Perry Street Theater in Greenwich Village in 1988.

==== Cast ====
- Daniel Gerroll as Colin
- Doris Black as Elaine
- Gates McFadden as Kate
- Dan Butler as Mike
- Alice Haining as Helen
- Jerry Manning as Malcolm

=== Other ===
Within nine months of its Australian premiere, it also premiered at Toronto Free Theatre, Canada and the Lyric Theatre in the West End of London.

== Film ==
In 1988, Michael Jenkins directed a film version of the play.

== Possible inspirations ==
Williamson and Denis Whitburn worked on a Second World War miniseries with the director Chris Thomson titled The Last Bastion, which ran on Network Ten. The running time was 360 minutes. (Academy Home Entertainment released a version that ran only 160 minutes to U.S. home video.) The miniseries was much ballyhooed but was not well rated. Also, Williamson assisted his brother-in-law, Chris Löfvén, on Oz, an Australian rock musical film that retold 1939 film The Wizard of Oz on the streets of Melbourne. The fictional Land of Oz rarely comes up in Australian conversation; the term is used almost exclusively as the nickname for one's own country.

The title of the play Emerald City has been used as a frequent nickname for the city of Sydney since the play was first presented. The title has been attributed to Brett Sheehy who was Sydney Theatre Company's literary manager when the play was written and first produced. The play's director, Richard Wherrett, recalls in his autobiography, The Floor of Heaven, that Sheehy suggested Emerald City as the title, which Williamson accepted, adding the line of dialogue, "The Emerald city of Oz. Everyone comes here along their yellow brick roads looking for the answers to their problems and all they find are the demons within themselves."

The play was once called The Ingratiator.
