= Venus in Fur =

Play written by David Ives

- Original language: English
- Written by: David Ives
- Characters: Vanda Jordan; Thomas Novachek
- Genre: Drama

Premiere
- Date: January 13, 2010
- Place: Classic Stage Company; New York City

Venus in Fur is a two-person play by David Ives set in modern New York City. The play had its premiere off-Broadway at the Classic Stage Company in 2010 and on Broadway in 2011.

== Productions ==
Venus in Fur opened off-Broadway at the Classic Stage Company on January 13, 2010. The play was originally set to close on February 21, 2010, and was extended to March 7, 2010. The cast featured Nina Arianda and Wes Bentley with direction by Walter Bobbie. The play helped relaunch Bentley's career.

Venus in Fur then opened on Broadway on November 8, 2011. It was produced by the Manhattan Theatre Club at the Samuel J. Friedman Theatre. Previews began on October 13, 2011. Nina Arianda reprised her role as Vanda and Hugh Dancy played Thomas Novachek, the writer-director. Walter Bobbie directed. The production ended its limited engagement at the Friedman on December 18 and resumed performances at the Lyceum Theatre on February 7, 2012, in a limited engagement through June 17, 2012. Arianda won the Tony Award for Best Actress in a Play for her performance in the Broadway production, which also received a nomination for Best Play.

In 2013, the play saw its Australian premiere in a production by the Queensland Theatre Company in Brisbane with Libby Munro as Vanda and Todd MacDonald as Thomas. Dana Brooke as Vanda was declared one of the "Performances of the Year" by The Sacramento Bee in B Street Theatre's production in 2013.

The play received its Canadian Premiere in Toronto in a 2013 production by the Canadian Stage Company. The show was so successful that it returned for an additional run later in the 2013–2014 season, and returned once more in the company's 2014–2015 season. Carly Street won a Dora Award for her portrayal of Vanda. Rick Miller co-stars as Thomas. The production was directed by Jennifer Tarver.

In 2017, the play had its London West End Premiere at the Theatre Royal Haymarket. This production was directed by Patrick Marber and starred Natalie Dormer and David Oakes as Vanda and Thomas respectively.

== Plot ==
Thomas Novachek is the writer-director of a new play opening in New York City; this play-within-the-play is an adaptation of the 1870 novel Venus in Furs by Leopold von Sacher-Masoch (the novel that inspired the term "masochism"). The play begins with Novachek on the telephone, lamenting the inadequacies of the actresses who had shown up that day to audition for the lead character, Wanda von Dunayev. Suddenly, at the last minute, a new actress called Vanda (Wanda) Jordan bursts in. At first it's hard to imagine that she will please this very particular and exasperated writer/director: She's brash, vulgar and unschooled. But she convinces him to let her audition for the part of Wanda von Dunayev, with the director/writer reading the part of Severin von Kushemski. Much happens during this dynamic reading, as lightning flashes and thunder crashes outside. Vanda shows astonishing insights into the novel and her character, and she performs what is in effect a terrific audition. They both become caught up in the characters they are reading. The balance of power is reversed, and the actress establishes dominance over the director, which is similar to what occurs in the novel.

== Awards and nominations ==
Nina Arianda won a Tony Award, the Clarence Derwent Award, Clive Barnes Award, and the Theatre World Award. She also received nominations for the 2010 Outer Critics Circle Award for Outstanding Actress in a Play, the 2010 Lucille Lortel Award, Outstanding Lead Actress, and the Drama League Award, Distinguished Performance. She won the 2011/12 Tony Award for Best Performance by an Actress in a Leading Role in a Play.

Other nominations were the Lucille Lortel Award for Outstanding Director and Outstanding Costume Design (Anita Yavich), the Drama League Award for Distinguished Production of a Play, and the Tony Award for Best Play.

For the West End production, Natalie Dormer was nominated for WhatsOnStage.com Audience Award for Best Actress in a Play.

== Film version ==
Director Roman Polanski shot a film version of the play, in French, in late 2012. The film stars Polanski's wife Emmanuelle Seigner and Mathieu Amalric.
