= Bille Brown =

Australian actor

- Born: William Gerard Brown; 11 January 1952; Biloela, Queensland, Australia
- Died: 13 January 2013 (aged 61); Brisbane, Queensland, Australia
- Education: University of Queensland
- Occupations: Actor, playwright, director
- Years active: 1976–2012
- Awards: Member of the Order of Australia

William Gerald Brown AM (11 January 1952 – 13 January 2013) professionally known as Bille Brown was an Australian stage, film and television actor, director and acclaimed playwright.

== Early life ==
Brown was born in the coal, wheat and cotton country town of Biloela, Queensland, to Bill and Maureen Brown. His father, Bill, was almost two generations older and had worked as a stockman, publican and railway worker. His mother Maureen worked in Creevey’s music store. He was raised Catholic.

While growing up in Biloela, Brown played piano, wrote poetry, painted, as well as performing small stage pieces at the local theatre. He also spent time as a rugby league referee.

Brown initially had aspirations to become a painter, attending a summer painting school in Brisbane at the age of 16. He subsequently undertook tertiary studies at the University of Queensland (UQ) to be a history and geography teacher, and while doing so, became involved with the student drama company Dramsoc. He made his professional debut with the Queensland Theatre Company in 1971, working alongside Geoffrey Rush. He graduated with a Bachelor of Arts in Drama and a Postgraduate Diploma of Education in 1973.

== Career ==
=== Theatre ===
Brown's career took him abroad to Britain, where he joined the Royal Shakespeare Company (RSC), and was the first Australian commissioned to write and perform in their own play The Swan Down Gloves. The show opened at the Barbican Theatre and had a Royal Command Performance. He appeared in the RSC's premiere production of The Wizard of Oz in the roles of the Wicked Witch of the West and Miss Gulch, for which he was nominated for an Laurence Olivier Award in 1988.

As a member of the RSC, Brown toured with their productions throughout Europe, playing Paris, Vienna, Berlin and Munich. Brown also performed in the West End, at the Aldwych and Haymarket Theatres, the Chichester Festival Theatre, English National Opera and Dublin Theatre Festival.

Brown made his Broadway debut as an actor in 1986 in Michael Frayn's Wild Honey with Ian McKellen, directed by Christopher Morahan, and as a playwright with his adaptation of a benefit performance of A Christmas Carol in 1985, featuring Len Cariou as Scrooge. That same year his adaptation of A Christmas Carol was staged in London and on Broadway, and then the following year at the Marriott Theatre in Lincolnshire, Illinois starring F. Murray Abraham as Scrooge.

Brown returned to Australia to live permanently in 1996. He had an outstanding career on stage and performed for many leading Australian theatre companies, including Queensland Theatre Company, Sydney Theatre Company, Bell Shakespeare Company, Malthouse Theatre, Melbourne Theatre Company, Company B, State Theatre Company of South Australia, Marian St Theatre, La Boite and the Old Tote Theatre at the Sydney Opera House.

In 1996, he directed the Australian stage production of Hugh Lunn's Over the Top with Jim, which exceeded box office expectations. He had huge success with his role as Count Almaviva in Beaumarchais' The Marriage of Figaro, with Geoffrey Rush, which opened the new Playhouse in Brisbane in September 1998. In 1999 he also had major success throughout Australia as Oscar Wilde in the Belvoir St production of David Hare's The Judas Kiss, for which he won a Matilda Award.

Brown also directed John Cleese in his solo show John Cleese – His Lifetimes and Medical Problems, as well as directing the operas Don Giovanni and Samson and Delilah.

In 2009, Brown wrote and performed in Queensland Theatre Company's The School of Arts, a production about 'College Players' who toured Shakespeare through Queensland in the late 1960s. He also wrote Bill and Mary, based on imaginary conversations between the poet Mary Gilmore and the portrait painter William Dobell while she was sitting for him. and Aladdin for The Old Vic, starring Sir Ian McKellan.

Brown was the recipient of a 2009 Helpmann Award for his role as King Arthur in the musical Monty Python musical Spamalot. In 2012, he performed to critical acclaim as Bruscon in sell-out seasons of Thomas Bernhard's play The Histrionic in both Melbourne and Sydney, receiving a Helpmann Awards nomination.

In 2002, when the Queensland Theatre Company moved to Queensland Performing Arts Centre (QPAC), they named their theatre space the "Bille Brown Studio", in recognition of Brown's contribution to the Arts and the 29 QTC productions he had appeared in.

=== Film and television ===
John Cleese cast Brown in 1997 film Fierce Creatures (the sequel to A Fish Called Wanda), after spotting him performing onstage at Stratford in the UK.

Brown appeared in several other films, including Oscar and Lucinda (1997) as Percy Smith, The Dish (2000) as the Prime Minister, The Chronicles of Narnia: The Voyage of the Dawn Treader (2010) as Coriakin, Killer Elite (2011) as Colonel Fitz and Singularity (2013) as Egerton.

Brown also appeared in a variety of Australian television roles. He had a 13 episode recurring role as Lightfoot in drama series Big Sky in 1999. He played Howard in miniseries A Difficult Woman (1999), and Booth in miniseries The Farm (2001).

He made guest appearances in Medivac (1997), Bad Cop, Bad Cop (2002), White Collar Blue (2003), Grass Roots (2003), The Cooks (2004), The Hollowmen (2008), All Saints (2000 and 2009), Wild Boys (2011), Miss Fisher’s Murder Mysteries and Rake (both 2012). He also guested in US series The Adventures of Young Indiana Jones (1999) and UK series Heartbeat (2009).

He played former Australian Prime Minister Robert Menzies in the made for television film Curtin. Brown was nominated for an Australian Film Institute Award for his supporting role as George Ritchie in the 2009 television film 3 Acts of Murder.

=== Teaching ===
Brown was Artist-in-Residence at the State University of New York in 1982, a visiting professor at the State University of New York at New Paltz, and Writer-in-Residence at The Acting Company, New York.

In 1999 he accepted an offer to be Adjunct Professor in the School of English, Media Studies and Art History at the University of Queensland, and gave workshops and master classes for drama students. He received an Honorary Doctorate of Letters from the university in 2011.

Brown was also Lecturer in Drama and Theatre at Australian Catholic University (ACU), Queensland University of Technology (QUT), The Michael Chekhov Studio and University of New York.

== Honours and awards ==
Year	Work	Award	Category	Result
1988	The Wizard of Oz	Laurence Olivier Awards	Outstanding Performance of the Year by an Actor in a Musical	Nominated
1992	Twelfth Night	Matilda Awards	Gold Matilda Award for Performance in a Play	Won
1999	Judas Kiss	Matilda Awards	Performance in a Play	Won
2001	Bille Brown	Centenary Medal	Distinguished Service to the Arts	Honoured
2009	Monty Python's Spamalot	Helpmann Awards	Best Male Actor in a Musical	Won
2009	3 Acts of Murder	Australian Film Institute Awards	Best Guest or Supporting Actor in a Television Drama	Nominated
2011	Bille Brown	Australia Day Honours List Member of the Order of Australia (AM)	Service to the performing arts as an actor and playwright, and to education	Honoured
2011	Bille Brown	University of Queensland	Honorary Doctorate of Letters	Honoured
2012	The Histrionic	Helpmann Awards	Best Male Actor in a Play	Nominated

== Personal life ==
Brown was often referred to as "The Boy from Biloela".

He had a sister, Rita Carter, who was a primary school teacher in Kenmore, Brisbane.

Brown was openly gay. He had two long-term relationships, including a male live-in partner in the US, but also had girlfriends.

== Death ==
Brown died after a year-long battle with bowel cancer on 13 January 2013, two days after his 61st birthday, in the suburb of Chermside in Brisbane. After a private funeral, a public memorial service was held at the Queensland Performing Arts Centre on 4 February 2013. The eulogy was delivered by longtime friend and colleague Geoffrey Rush.

== Filmography ==
=== Film ===
Year	Work	Award	Type
1997	Fierce Creatures	Neville Coltrane	Feature film
1997	Oscar and Lucinda	Percy Smith	Feature film
1999	Passion	John Grainger	Feature film
2000	Walk the Talk	Barry	Feature film
2000	The Dish	Prime Minister	Feature film
2001	Serenades	Pastor Hoffman	Feature film
2001	The Man Who Sued God	Gerry Ryan	Feature film
2002	Black and White	Sir Thomas Playford	Feature film
2002	Dirty Deeds	Senator McGovers	Feature film
2003	Silent Storm	Hedley Marston	Docudrama film
2005	Blackjack: In the Money	Tez Miller	TV movie
2007	Curtin	Robert Menzies	TV movie
2007	Unfinished Sky	Bob Potter	Feature film
2008	Ascension	The Leader	Short film
2008	Dying Breed	Harvey / Rowan	Feature film
2009	The Pessimist	Bob	Short film
2009	3 Acts of Murder	George Ritchie	TV movie
2009	At World's End (aka Ved verdens ende)	James Hall	Feature film
2010	The Chronicles of Narnia: The Voyage of the Dawn Treader	Coriakin	Feature film
2011	The Eye of the Storm	Dudley	Feature film
2011	Killer Elite	Colonel Fitz	Feature film
2011	Mug's Game	Bill Mayer	Short film
2012	Silver Stiletto	Father Hegerty	Short film
2013	Singularity (aka The Lovers)	Egerton (final film role)	Feature film

=== Television ===
Year	Work	Award	Type
1997	Medivac	Prosecutor	TV series, season 2, 2 episodes
1998	A Difficult Woman	Howard	Miniseries, 3 episodes
1999	Big Sky	Lightfoot	TV series, season 2, 13 episodes
1999	The Young Indiana Jones Chronicles	Hinkel	TV series, season 3, episode 1: "Tales of Innocence"
2001	The Farm	Booth	Miniseries, 3 episodes
2002	Bad Cop, Bad Cop	Detective 'Blue' Wales	Miniseries, episode 2: "He Who Slips on Milkshakes"
2003	White Collar Blue	Tony Heron	TV series, season 1, episode 18
2003	Grass Roots	Hector Abbott	TV series, season 2, episode 6: "Egomania"
2004	The Cooks	Colin	TV series, episode 5: "Waltzing Sakamoto"
2008	The Hollowmen	Senator Ron Engels	TV series, episode 2: "The Ambassador"
2000, 2009	All Saints	Steve Coulter / Bill Lewis	TV series, 3 episodes
2009	Heartbeat	Sergeant Flaherty	TV series, season 18, 2 episodes
2011	Wild Boys	Booth	TV series, episode 12
2012	Miss Fisher's Murder Mysteries	Bart Tarrant	TV series, season 1, episode 6: "Ruddy Gore"
	The Kennedys		Miniseries
2012	Rake	Dominic Rose	TV series, season 2, episode 7: "Greene vs Hole"

== Theatre ==
=== As actor ===
Year	Work	Award	Type
1971	The Wrong Side of the Moon	Tomlyn	SGIO Theatre, Brisbane with QTC
1971	Hadrian VII		SGIO Theatre, Brisbane with QTC
1972	A Refined Look at Existence	Donny	La Boite Theatre, Brisbane
1973	Indians		La Boite Theatre, Brisbane
1973	President Wilson in Paris	President Wilson	La Boite Theatre, Brisbane with QTC
1973	White with Wire Wheels	Rod	La Boite Theatre with QTC
1973	Pygmalion		SGIO Theatre, Brisbane with QTC
1973	The Imaginary Invalid	Monsieur Argan	SGIO Theatre, Brisbane with QTC
1973	Hamlet on Ice		Cement Box Theatre, Brisbane with Frame and Kennett Promotions
1973	Suddenly at Home		SGIO Theatre, Brisbane with QTC
1974	Mandrake		SGIO Theatre, Brisbane with QTC
1974	Death of a Salesman		SGIO Theatre, Brisbane with QTC
1974	The Rivals		SGIO Theatre, Brisbane with QTC
1974	The Philanthropist		SGIO Theatre, Brisbane with QTC
1974	The Chapel Perilous	Michael	Sydney Opera House with Old Tote Theatre Company
1975	The Taming of the Shrew	Tranio (later disguised as Lucentio)	SGIO Theatre, Brisbane with QTC
1976–1977	Wild Oats	Ruffian 1 / Waiter, Wild Oats	Aldwych Theatre, London, Royal Shakespeare Theatre, Stratford with RSC
1977–1978	As You Like It	Duke's Bodyguard / Forester / Jaques de Boys	Royal Shakespeare Theatre, Stratford, Theatre Royal, Newcastle with RSC
1977–1978	Henry VI, Part 1	Sir Thomas Gargrave / Soldier at the Gate	Royal Shakespeare Theatre, Stratford, Theatre Royal, Newcastle, Aldwych Theatre, London with RSC
1977–1978	Henry VI, Part 2	Sawyer	Royal Shakespeare Theatre, Stratford, Theatre Royal, Newcastle, Aldwych Theatre, London with RSC
1977–1978	Henry VI, Part 3	Keeper / Watch	Royal Shakespeare Theatre, Stratford, Theatre Royal, Newcastle, Aldwych Theatre, London with RSC
1977–1979	Coriolanus	Volscian Citizen 2	Royal Shakespeare Theatre, Stratford, Aldwych Theatre, London, RSC tour
1978	Hamlet on Ice	Editor / Gertrude	Young Vic, London with RSC
1978	The Women-Pirates Ann Bonney and Mary Read	Soldier	Aldwych Theatre, London with RSC
1978	Old Tyme Music Hall		Royal Shakespeare Theatre, Stratford Aldwych Theatre, London with RSC
1978	Saratoga, or Pistols for Seven	Frederick Carter	Aldwych Theatre, London with RSC
1980–1981	Hamlet	Barnardo / English Ambassador / Reynaldo	Royal Shakespeare Theatre, Stratford, Theatre Royal, Newcastle with RSC
1980–1981	As You Like It	Le Beau / Sir Oliver Martext	Theatre Royal, Newcastle, Royal Shakespeare Theatre, Stratford, Aldwych Theatre, London with RSC
1980–1981	Richard II	Sir Henry Green	Royal Shakespeare Theatre, Stratford, Aldwych Theatre, London, Theatre Royal, Newcastle with RSC
1980–1981	Richard III	Lord Lovel	Royal Shakespeare Theatre, Stratford, Aldwych Theatre, London, Theatre Royal, Newcastle with RSC
1980–1982	The Swan Down Gloves	Griselda Brimstone	Barbican Theatre, London Royal Command Performance, Royal Shakespeare Theatre, Stratford, Aldwych Theatre, London, New York with RSC
1981	Troilus and Cressida	Paris	Aldwych Theatre, London with RSC
1983	Much Ado About Nothing	Benedick	Albert Park Amphitheatre, Brisbane with QTC
1984	Henry V	King Henry V	Albert Park Amphitheatre, Brisbane with QTC
1985	The Real Thing	Henry	SGIO Theatre, Brisbane with QTC
1985	Cheapside		Cremorne Theatre, Brisbane, Redcliffe Entertainment Centre with QTC
1985, 1986	A Christmas Carol		London, Symphony Space, Broadway with RSC, Marriott Theatre, Lincolnshire, Illinois
1986	Wild Honey	Dr Triletzky	Ahmanson Theatre, Los Angeles, Virginia Theater, New York
	The Threepenny Opera		Shaw Festival, USA
	The Millionairess		Shaw Festival, USA
	Accidental Death of an Anarchist		Broadway / LA
	A Man for All Seasons		Broadway / LA
	Almost a Joke		State University of New York at New Paltz, Broadway / LA
	The Fantasticks		State University of New York at New Paltz, Broadway / LA
	The School for Scandal		Dublin Theatre Festival
	Dear Liar		McKenna Productions, New York
	Waiting for Godot		Virginia Stage Company
	The Beastly Beastitudes of Balthazar		Virginia Stage Company
	Life Class		Art Institute of Chicago
1987–1989	The Wizard of Oz	Wicked Witch of the West / Miss Gulch	London Fringe Royal Shakespeare Theatre, Stratford, Barbican Theatre, London with RSC
1987	The Merry Wives of Windsor	John Falstaff	Albert Park Amphitheatre, Brisbane with QTC
1989–1990	London Assurance	Richard Dazzle	Theatre Royal, Bath, Chichester Festival Theatre & other locations
	Love's Labour's Lost		Chichester Festival Theatre
1992	Popular Mechanicals 1 and 2		Belvoir Street Theatre, Sydney
1992	Twelfth Night	Malvolio	Suncorp Theatre, Brisbane with QTC
	Richard II		Grin and Tonic
	King Lear		Grin and Tonic
1993	Kiss of the Spiderwoman	Molina	La Boite Theatre, Brisbane with Orford Productions International
1993	And a Nightingale Sang	George	Cremorne Theatre, Brisbane with QTC
1993	The Caucasian Chalk Circle		Cremorne Theatre, Brisbane with Queensland Performing Arts Trust & QUT
1993	The Shaughraun or The Loveable Rascal	Corry Kinchela	Suncorp Theatre, Brisbane with QTC
1993	A Christmas Carol		Concert Hall, Brisbane with Orford Productions International
1993–1994	Twelfth Night	Sir Andrew Aguecheek	Barbican Theatre, London, Theatre Royal, Newcastle upon Tyne, Barbican Theatre, London, Royal Shakespeare Theatre, Stratford with RSC
1994, 1995	Measure for Measure	Elbow	Theatre Royal, Newcastle upon Tyne, Barbican Theatre, London with RSC
1995–1996	La Belle Vivette	M. Boulot	London Coliseum with English National Opera
1997	Summer Rain	Harold	Suncorp Theatre, Brisbane with QTC
1997	After the Ball	Stephen MacCrae (older)	Suncorp Theatre, Brisbane, Theatre Royal, Hobart, Playhouse, Melbourne, Her Majesty's Theatre, Adelaide, Monash University with QTC & MTC
1998	Tom and Clem		Marian Street Theatre, Sydney with Northside Theatre Company
1998	The Marriage of Figaro	Count Atmaviva	Playhouse, Brisbane with QTC
1999	The Judas Kiss	Oscar Wilde	Belvoir Street Theatre, Sydney, Playhouse, Melbourne, Playhouse, Canberra, The Capital, Bendigo, Playhouse, Brisbane
1999, 2000	Twelfth Night	Malvolio	Playhouse, Adelaide with STCSA
2000, 2001	Troilus and Cressida	Calchas	Melbourne Athenaeum, Playhouse, Canberra, Sydney Opera House with Bell Shakespeare
2001	The Forest	Gennadiy Dem'yanych Neschastlivtsev	Playhouse, Brisbane with QTC
2001	King Ubu	Pa Ubu	Belvoir Street Theatre, Sydney
2002, 2003	Bill and Mary	Bill Dobell	Playhouse, Brisbane, Stables Theatre, Sydney
2003	Hamlet	Old Hamlet / First Player / Gravedigger	Sydney Opera House, Orange Civic Theatre, Playhouse, Canberra, Ford Theatre, Geelong, Playhouse, Melbourne, Theatre Royal, Hobart with Bell Shakespeare
2003	Howard Katz	Howard Katz	Sydney Opera House with STC
2004	Twelfth Night	Malvolio	Sydney Opera House, Playhouse, Melbourne, Playhouse, Canberra, Illawarra Performing Arts Centre, Orange Civic Theatre with Bell Shakespeare
2005	Hitchcock Blonde	Hitch	Playhouse, Melbourne with MTC
2006, 2008	Feasting on Flesh	Ringmaster	Spiegeltent, Brisbane, Sydney Opera House, Edinburgh Festival with Strut 'n' Fret
2007	Exit the King	The Doctor / Astrologist	Malthouse Theatre, Melbourne, Belvoir Street Theatre, Sydney
2007	Spamalot	King Arthur / Understudy for Patsy	Her Majesty's Theatre, Melbourne with Michael Coppel for MICF
2009	The School of Arts	Bronson Savage	Playhouse, Brisbane & Queensland regional tour with QTC
2009	Dirty Rotten Scoundrels	Lawrence Jameson	State Theatre, Melbourne with The Production Company
2010	Elizabeth: Almost by Chance a Woman	Shakespeare / Lady Donna Zogretta	Malthouse Theatre, Melbourne
2011	The Seagull	Dorn	Belvoir Street Theatre, Sydney
2011	As You Like It	Duke Frederick / Jacques	Belvoir Street Theatre, Sydney
2012	The Histrionic	Bruscon	Malthouse Theatre, Melbourne, Wharf Theatre with STC
	The Chocolate Frog		QTC

=== As writer / director ===
Year	Work	Award	Type
1973	Ship of Fools	Writer	Brisbane Grammar School
1974	Springle	Writer	QTC
1975	The Taming of the Shrew	Musical Arranger	SGIO Theatre, Brisbane with QTC
1975–1987	Tufff...	Playwright	QTC, Royal Court Theare, London, Riverina Playhouse, Wagga Wagga
1975	Egg Froth the Frithed	Playwright	QTC
1977	Prunes	Writer	QTC
1978–1982	The Peculiar Treasure	Writer	Six part series of plays
1978–1982	God's Idiots	Director	University of New York
1980–1982, 1987	The Swan Down Gloves	Playwright / Lyricist / Bookwriter / Director	Barbican Theatre, London Royal Command Performance, Royal Shakespeare Theatre, Stratford, Aldwych Theatre, London & McKenna Theatre at State University of New York at New Paltz with RSC
1983	Playfolk	Writer	
1985, 1986	A Christmas Carol	Adaptor	London, Symphony Space, Broadway with RSC Marriott Theatre, Lincolnshire, Illinois
1985	Unreal	Writer	STCSA
1986	Colorados (renamed version of Playfolk)	Writer	Shaw Festival, Pennsylvania
	The Philanthropist	Director	State University of New York at New Paltz
	Almost a Joke	Writer	State University of New York at New Paltz, Broadway / LA
1988	The Light Fantastik	Writer	Corning Glass Works, New York
c.1988	Séance	Writer	
1991	The Country Party: A Political Romance	Writer	
1991	Faust	Associate Director	Lyric Theatre, Brisbane with Opera Queensland & Victorian Opera
1993	A Christmas Carol	Adaptor	Concert Hall, Brisbane with Orford Productions International
1996	Redskins (renamed version of Playfolk)	Playwright	Royal Shakespeare Theatre, Stratford, The Other Place, Stratford
1996	Over the Top with Jim	Director / Script consultant	Conservatorium Theatre, Brisbane with QPAC for Brisbane Festival
1997, 1998	Samson et Dalila	Director	Lyric Theatre, Brisbane, State Theatre, Melbourne, Sydney Opera House with Opera Queensland
2000	National Playwrights Conference	Director	STCSA
2002, 2003	Bill and Mary	Playwright	Playhouse, Brisbane, Stables Theatre, Sydney
2004–2005	Aladdin	Adaptor	The Old Vic, London
2005	John Cleese – His Life, Times and Medical Problems	Director	New Zealand & New York tours with Adrian Bohm Productions
2009	The School of Arts	Actor / Playwright	Playhouse, Brisbane & Queensland regional tour with QTC
	Don Giovanni	Director	Opera Queensland
	A Rossini Gala	Director	Opera Queensland
	The Magic Flute	Director	Opera Queensland
	Noyes Fludde (aka Noah's Flood)	Director	St John’s Cathedral, Brisbane with Opera Queensland
