= Helen Christinson =

Australian born actress

Helen Christinson is an Australian-born actress. She has appeared in a number of stage, film and television productions.

== Biography ==
Helen Christinson was born and raised in Brisbane, Queensland. She graduated from Queensland University of Technology with a Bachelor of Fine Arts (Acting). Prior to finishing her acting degree, she was cast in the lead role of the world premiere of The Drowning Bride at La Boîte Theatre. She was nominated for a Matilda Award for best actress for her portrayal of the dual roles of Ellen and Sarmitte.

Following her professional debut, she secured the role of Amanda Webster in QTC's production of Noël Coward's Private Lives directed by Michael Gow and received critical acclaim for her portrayal of the volatile Amanda.

Christinson has continued to perform in numerous theatre productions across Australia including The 39 Steps, Macbeth, for which she was again nominated for a Matilda Best Actress Award, and A Doll's House, for which she won a Matilda Best Actress Award for her portrayal of Nora.

Christinson's film credits include Reef n Beef, Harrisville and The Underdog's Tale.

She has also appeared in the ABC's World War II drama Sisters of War.

== Performing credits ==
=== Theatre ===
- 2015: Caress/Ache
- 2015: Medea
- 2014: A Doll's House
- 2011: Apologia
- 2011: The Joy of Text
- 2010: Macbeth
- 2009: Secret Bridesmaid's Business
- 2008: The 39 Steps
- 2007: John Gabriel Borkman
- 2006: The Cold Child
- 2006: Private Lives
- 2005: The Drowning Bride

=== Films ===
- 2010: Reef n Beef
- 2007: Harrisville
- 2005: The Underdog's Tale
- 2005: Endurance Island

=== Short films ===
- 2011: Awake
- 2011: Stay Awake
- 2010: Lightening
- 2008: The Pitch

=== Television ===
- 2010: Sisters of War
- 2004: Through My Eyes
