= Babette Stephens =

Australian actress (1910–2001)

Babette Stevens (AM, MBE)
- Born: Phyllis Babette Fergusson; 26 April 1910; England
- Died: 28 February 2001 (aged 90); Brisbane, Australia
- Occupations: Actress; theatre director; artistic director; TV game show panellist; talk radio hostess; acting teacher

Phyllis Babette Stephens AM MBE (née Fergusson) (26 April 1910 – 28 February 2001) was an Australian actress, director, artistic director, TV game show panelist and acting teacher. A leading theatrical pioneer, she also appeared in film and television, and hosted talkback radio.

== Biography ==
She was born in England. Her theatrical career began after she joined the Brisbane Repertory Theatre in 1930.

In the Brisbane Repertory Theatre society, now called La Boite Theatre, she served as Council President from 1957 to 1959 and Theatre Director from 1960 to 1968. It was under her leadership that the company acquired its first permanent premises and performing space, and constructed the first La Boite theatre. (The La Boite theatre after which the company is now named is the second, built in the early 1970s.)

She was awarded an MBE (Member of the Order of the British Empire) in 1972 for her services to theater and in 1994, was awarded the AM (Member of the Order of Australia) for her services to the performing arts.

She is the subject of a biography, Never Upstaged: Babette Stephens, Her Life and Times by Jay McKee, published in 2004. According to her biography her last acting student was Australian actor, Dwayne Lawler.

Her funeral, held at St John's Cathedral, Brisbane, was attended by around 500 people. She received a standing ovation. The speakers included Sue Rider, the immediate past artistic director of La Boite Theatre, and Matt Foley, Queensland's Minister for the Arts.
