= Metro Arts Theatre =

Heritage-listed building in Brisbane, Queensland

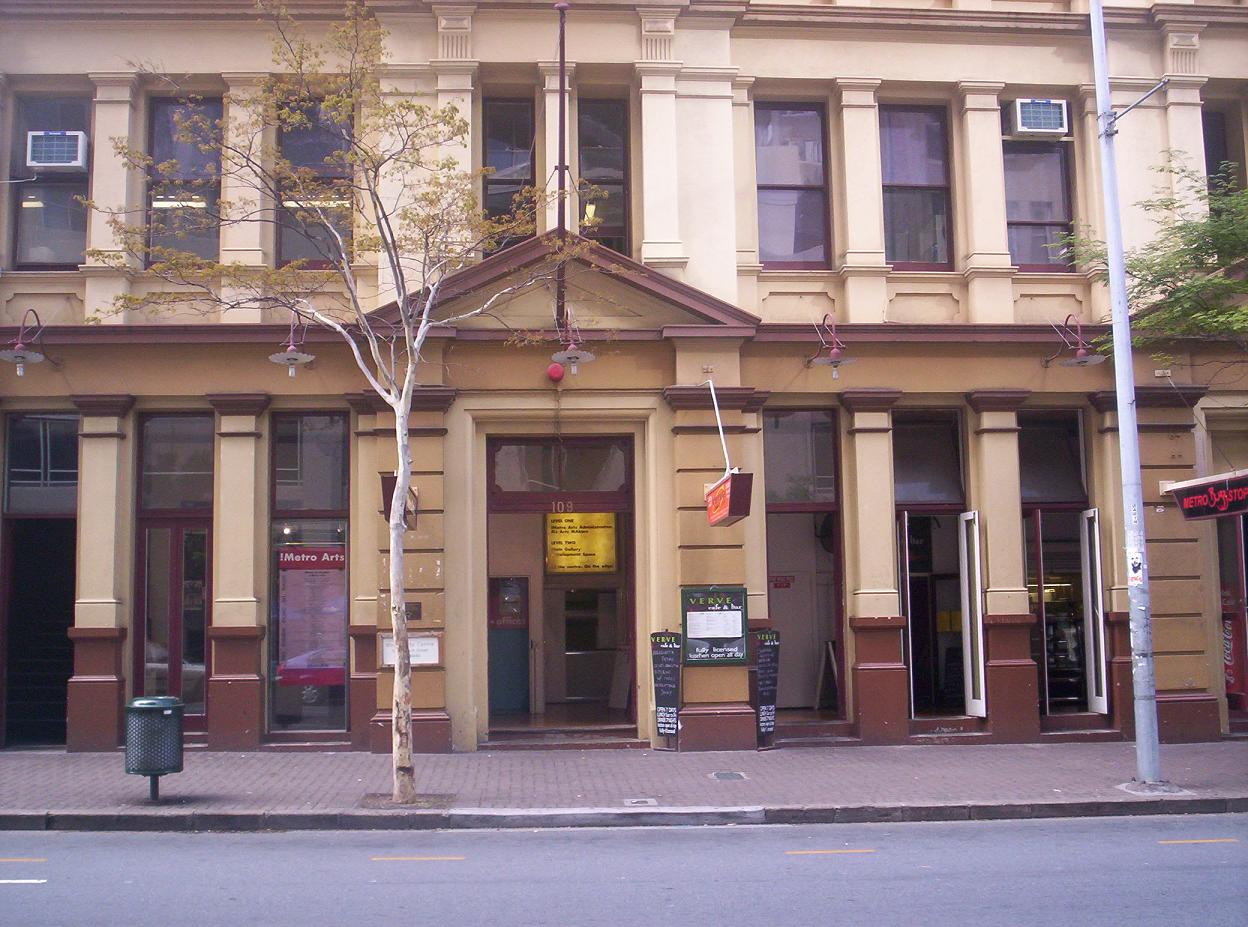
- Entrance of Metro Arts Theatre, 2005

- Location within Queensland
- 27.47°S 153.029°E
- Location: 117 Edward Street, Brisbane City, City of Brisbane, Queensland, Australia

History
- Design period: 1870s–1890s (late 19th century)
- Built: 1890

Queensland Heritage Register
- Official name: 109 Edward Street, Community Arts Centre, Coronation House, Metro Arts Centre
- Type: state heritage (built)
- Designated: 21 October 1992
- Reference no.: 600090
- Significant period: 1890 (fabric); 1890–1930, 1938–1949, 1949–1976, 1981 (historical)
- Significant components: carriage/wagon/dray entrance, hoist

Metro Arts Theatre is a heritage-listed building, originally a warehouse and then a theatre complex, at 109–117 Edward Street, Brisbane City, Queensland, Australia. It was built in 1890. It has also been known as Community Arts Centre, Coronation House, and Metro Arts Centre. Theatres within the building have included the Edward Street Theatre, also known as New Edward Street Theatre (as part of the Community Arts Centre in the 1980s), while the Sue Benner Theatre, the Basement and the Studio came later. Metro Arts moved out of the building in late 2020 to a purpose-built facility in West End.

The building was added to the Queensland Heritage Register on 21 October 1992.

== History ==
The site was purchased in 1871 by Captain George Poynter Heath, who erected a warehouse in 1890 and leased it to George Myers & Co, who imported porcelain, glass and earthenware products.

In March 1902 the upper levels were substantially damaged by fire but were later repaired.

The warehouse was subdivided in 1907 to accommodate other tenants. In 1912, Myers & Co purchased the building and became the sole occupants. The firm remained in the building until 1930 when it was forced into liquidation. Between 1931 and 1937 the building was vacant. In 1938 the building was renamed Coronation House in celebration of the coronation of George VI. It was occupied by various tenants including manufacturing agents and importers.

During the latter part of World War II, sections of the building were occupied by the Australian Government Department of Supply and Shipping. In March 1949 the property was acquired by the Australian Government and was used by various Australian government departments.

By the early 1970s the building was regarded as unsuitable for government offices and by 1976 all government departments had moved elsewhere. In that year, work began on converting the building into a community arts centre. In July 1981 the Community Arts Centre was officially opened, and contained theatre, two art galleries, rehearsal rooms, workshop spaces, meeting rooms, dark room, printing shop, cinema and restaurant. Further work was undertaken in 1988 to provide additional facilities for artists. From 1980 to 1989, the Edward Street Theatre, also known as the New Edward Street Theatre, was part of the Community Arts Centre, and was the venue for a number of notable performances, such as Bob Merritt's The Cake Man and Harold Pinter's Betrayal.

The building was renamed the Metro Arts Centre in 1988.

=== 21st century ===
In 2017, Metro Arts contained several venues: the Gallery, the Sue Benner Theatre, the Basement and the Studio, as well as multi-purpose spaces for creative businesses, individual artist studios and retail outlets. The inaugural classes of the Aboriginal Centre for the Performing Arts were held in the building in January 1998.

In November 2018 it was announced that Metro Arts would be selling the building, and it was sold in December 2019. Metro Arts moved to within West Village at 111 Boundary Street, West End, which officially opened in September 2020.

Metro Arts commissioned and published a book on the history of the organisation and its buildings, Art Starts Here: 40 Years of Metro Arts, published in 2020.

== Description ==
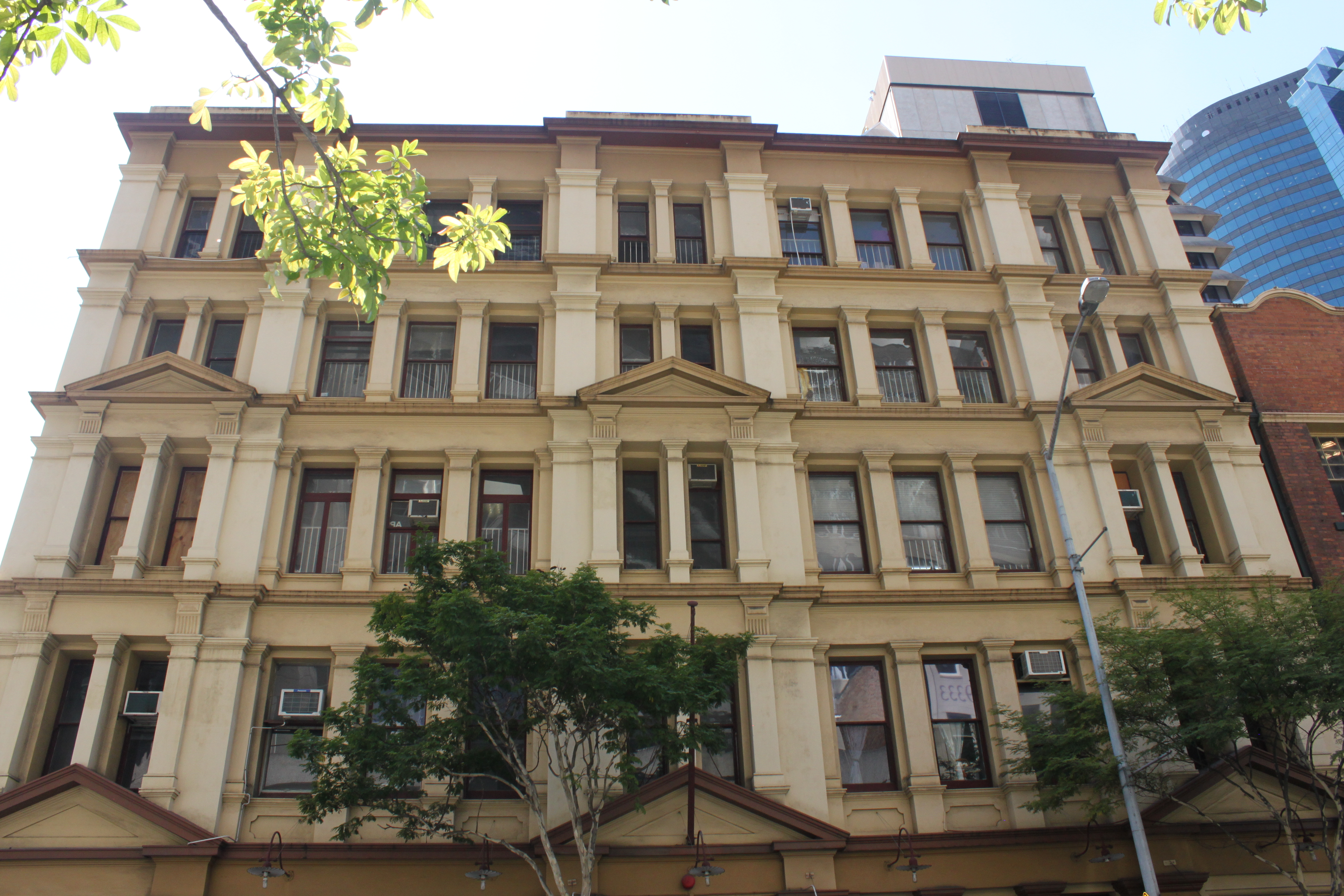
Metro Arts building, 2012

This is a five-storey brick building with a basement level. The internal structure consists of timber floors and columns. The street facade is divided into five bays by plain broad pilasters. The central and outside bays contain tall, narrow paired windows, while the wider intermediate bays contain three wider windows. All window openings are square-headed. The facade features austere classical detailing with string courses dividing the floor levels.

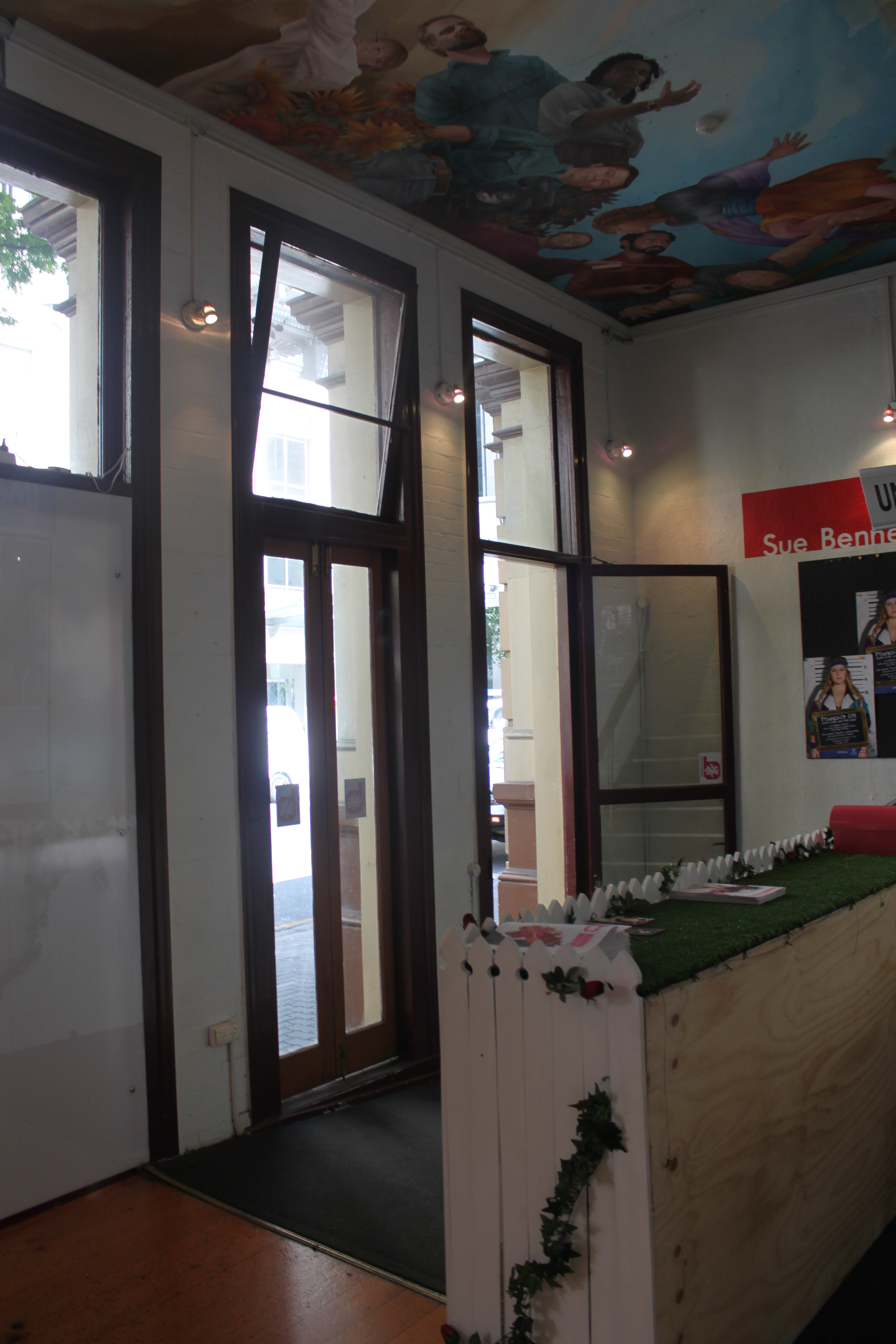
Interior, 2012

The ground floor level features, on the western side, a cart entrance and internal laneway which leads to a rear courtyard. The simple parapet has stepped sections above the central and outside bays. The sides of the building have no ornamentation but have a regular pattern of window openings. The rear of the building has an internal hoist and motor under a curved corrugated iron roof with hinged landings at each level.

The building is substantially intact, particularly the upper floors, with visible evidence of the timber columns and beams, timber flooring, brick walls and service hoist. Considerable settlement of the upper floors is evident. Alterations to the building include the removal of some floor structure and the insertion of partitioning to accommodate a cinema and cafeteria.

== Heritage listing ==
109 Edward Street was listed on the Queensland Heritage Register on 21 October 1992, having satisfied the following criteria.

The place is important in demonstrating the evolution or pattern of Queensland's history.

The Metro Arts Centre is significant for the evidence it provides, along with other surviving nineteenth and early twentieth century warehouses, of the scale of the former warehousing area in that part of the city.

The place demonstrates rare, uncommon or endangered aspects of Queensland's cultural heritage.

The Metro Arts Centre is significant as a good and rare example of a late Victorian warehouse.

The place is important in demonstrating the principal characteristics of a particular class of cultural places.

The Metro Arts Centre is significant as a good and rare example of a late Victorian warehouse.

The place is important because of its aesthetic significance.

The building is also significant for its visual contribution to the character and continuity of the Edward Street streetscape.

== See also ==
- Arts and culture in Brisbane
