= Bille Brown Theatre =

Theatre in Brisbane, Australia

Coordinates: 27.471995°S 153.014215°E

The Bille Brown Theatre is a 351-seat theatre at 78 Montague Road, South Brisbane, Brisbane, Queensland, Australia. The theatre is a corner-stage with raked seating on three sides. It is the main venue for Queensland Theatre.

It was named in 2002, in honour of the late Queensland actor, playwright and director Bille Brown, in recognition of his contribution to the Arts, when the Queensland Theatre Company moved to Queensland Performing Arts Centre (QPAC).

It reopened in October 2018 after a $5.5 million renovation which converted it from the former 228-seat Bille Brown Studio.
