= Queensland Theatre =

Australian theatre company

Queensland Theatre Company

General information
- Name: Queensland Theatre Company
- Previous names: Royal Queensland Theatre Company (1984–2001); Queensland Theatre Company (1970–1983), (2001–2016)
- Year founded: 1970; 56 years ago
- Founders: Alan Edwards
- Principal venue: Bille Brown Theatre, Diane Cilento Studio
- Website: queenslandtheatre.com.au

Senior staff
- Director: Criena Gehrke

Artistic staff
- Artistic director: Daniel Evans

Queensland Theatre Company, formerly the Queensland Theatre and Royal Queensland Theatre Company, is a professional theatre company based in Brisbane, Australia. It regularly performs in its own Bille Brown Theatre and the Queensland Performing Arts Centre's Playhouse.

The company was founded in 1970 by British actor and director Alan Edwards with a full company of performers. It was granted the prefix "Royal" in 1984. It is currently headed by executive director Criena Gehrke.

== History ==
The company has a strong history of development programs and has always aimed to encourage artistic growth across the state. There is an emerging artists program, writing program, including the Queensland Premier's Drama Award, and regional partnerships program.

Emphasis is also placed on developing and inspiring young people through the company's education and youth program, with programs including The Scene Project, Youth Ensemble, Theatre Residency Week, Young Playwrights and other master classes. The company is principally supported by the Queensland Government through Arts Queensland and the Major Performing Arts Board of Creative Australia.

== People ==
=== Actors ===
Actors who began their career with the original Queensland Theatre Company include Geoffrey Rush, Bille Brown, Kate Wilson (Foy) (former Chair of the Board of the Queensland Theatre Company and Honorary Professor of Theatre at the University of Southern Queensland), Carol Burns and David Waters. Many Queenslanders including Babette Stephens and Diane Cilento have worked with the original Queensland Theatre Company during their careers. A large number of Sydney and Melbourne-based actors have performed with the company, which some considered controversial as it reduced the number of opportunities for Queensland-based actors within the state-funded professional theatre.

=== Artistic directors ===
The foundation artistic director was Alan Edwards. He was succeeded in 1988 by Aubrey Mellor, who was followed by Chris Johnson, Robyn Nevin and director/playwright Michael Gow.

From July 2010, Wesley Enoch took over as artistic director, firstly on a part-time basis and then full-time in January 2011. becoming the first Indigenous person to head a state-funded theatre entity in Australia. Enoch left Queensland Theatre to become director of the Sydney Festival in October 2015, handing over to Sam Strong, former Associate Artistic Director at the Melbourne Theatre Company.

Other directors have included Gale Edwards, Joe McCallum, Rodney Fisher, Arnie Neeme and Murray Foy.

In 2019 it was announced that artistic director Sam Strong would be stepping down and that Lee Lewis would succeed him. In March 2024, Lee Lewis resigned from the position.

== Chairs ==
Following Elizabeth Jameson's eleven year stint, filmmaker Dean Gibson was appointed chair of the company's board in June 2024.

== Venues ==
For almost thirty years the Queensland Theatre Company used the purpose-built 600 seat SGIO Theatre in Turbot Street, Brisbane, as their chief venue for productions. In 1996 they moved to the Queensland Performing Arts Centre at South Bank. Queensland Theatre is based in its own complex at South Brisbane. It performs in the much smaller venues than the original SGIO Theatre, named after two well known Brisbane theatre actors, Bille Brown and Diane Cilento. It has in the past performed in the Playhouse Theatre, Cremorne Theatre and at one time in the Lyric Theatre, all part of the Queensland Performing Arts Centre.

== Productions ==
Productions have included: many Shakespeare's plays presented in the Roma Street Parkland Amphitheatre (formerly called the Albert Park Amphitheatre), as well in the Lyric Theatre, Cremorne Theatre and the Playhouse at the Queensland Performing Arts Centre. Other productions have included: Black Diggers, Macbeth (directed by Michael Attenborough), Twelfth Night, The Importance of Being Earnest by Oscar Wilde, The Alchemist by Ben Jonson, That Face by Polly Stenham, God of Carnage by Yasmina Reza, 25 Down by Richard Jordan, The School of Arts by Bille Brown, Ninety by Joanna Murray-Smith, The Year of Magical Thinking by Joan Didion, The Crucible by Arthur Miller, And a Nightingale Sang by C. P. Taylor and Toy Symphony by Michael Gow.

In 2017 the company staged a production of Ingmar Bergman's Scenes from a Marriage starring Sydney-based actors Marta Dusseldorp and her husband Ben Winspear.

In May 2021, the company staged an adaptation of William Shakespeare's The Taming of the Shrew in the Bille Brown Theatre, Brisbane, directed by Damien Ryan. Petruchio was played by Nicholas Brown, and Katharina by Anna McGahan. This year the company was also using the QPAC Playhouse.

== Select Productions ==
- 2008 – The Female of the Species, I am My Own Wife, The Prisoner of Second Avenue, Rabbit Hole, The August Moon, Travelling North, Anatomy Titus Fall of Rome, The Importance of Being Earnest, Stones in His Pockets,
- 2023 – Family Values 28 Jan – 25 Feb, Drizzle Boy 11 – 25 Mar, As You Like It 15 Apr – 13 May, At What Cost 25 May – 10 Jun, Tiny Beautiful Things 17 Jun – 8 Jul, Don't Ask What the Bird Look Like 19 Aug – 9 Sep, The Appleton Ladies' Potato Race 7 – 28 Oct, Vietgone 4 – 8 Nov
- 2024 – Gaslight 20 Feb – 3 Mar, 37 11 Apr – 4 May, Medea 11 May – 8 Jun, Cost of Living 15 Jun – 13 Jul, Dear Brother 7 – 28 Sep, Round The Twist: The Musical 12 Nov – 1 Dec
