= Ray Kolle =

Australian screenwriter (1941–2026)

- Born: 1941
- Died: 7 October 2026 (aged 85); Sydney, Australia
- Occupations: Screenwriter; playwright; script editor
- Website: raykolle.com

Ray Kolle (1941 – 7 October 2026) was an Australian screenwriter, known for his work in television. He wrote numerous scripts for Australian serial dramas and soap operas, including Bellbird, Sons and Daughters, The Sullivans, The Box, Neighbours, Prisoner and Home and Away. Kolle also co-wrote the stage play Nobody In Their Right Mind and co-created the German soap opera Unter uns.

== Life and career ==
Kolle worked as a bookseller and wrote playscripts for the stage, before he began writing comedy sketches for In Melbourne Tonight in 1967.

Kolle's screenwriting career began when he submitted a script for the ABC serial Bellbird, which the producers liked so much that he and his co-writer were immediately hired. Kolle wrote over 1600 episodes from 1967 until 1977, and was later promoted to script editor and story editor. He was also one of ten writers commissioned by ABV-2 to write stories for their 1972 series A Time for Love. His episode "And Mother Used to Sing" aired on 12 April and starred John Stanton, Jill Forster and Syd Conabere.

He undertook freelance work for Crawford Productions, writing for shows such as Homicide and The Bluestone Boys. David Knox of TV Tonight reported that Kolle "contributed extensively" to the plotting of soap operas The Sullivans and The Box. He also co-wrote the story for the 1975 film adaptation of The Box, before taking on the role of storylining and story editor on Sons and Daughters. Kolle particularly enjoyed writing for the show's villain Patricia "Pat the Rat" Hamilton, played by Rowena Wallace. After writing several scripts for Prisoner, Kolle became co-story editor alongside Betty Quin.

Kolle went on to write for Skyways, Cop Shop, miniseries Water Under the Bridge, Punishment, Starting Out, the weekly series Return to Eden, and Richmond Hill. In 1984, Kolle and Peter Pinne adapted The Torrents by Australian playwright Oriel Gray into a stage musical called A Bit o' Petticoat.

He was asked to join the writing department of soap opera Neighbours in 1986 as a story editor, following its move from the Seven Network to Network 10. He only agreed to accept the job if he had full authority over the script department, something which Knox (TV Tonight) believed would be akin to a script producer or showrunner role today. By 1987, Kolle was script supervisor at the Reg Grundy Organisation. Along with Jill Kavalek, Kolle wrote the play Nobody In Their Right Mind, which premiered at Sonning Mill in August 1990.

In 1992, while continuing to write for Neighbours, Kolle wrote scripts for New Zealand soap opera Shortland Street, soap opera Paradise Beach, and the 1994 miniseries The Damnation of Harvey McHugh. He co-created the German soap opera Unter uns with Jörg Brückner in 1994.

Kolle returned to writing full time for Neighbours in 1996, with his most notable contributions including the returns of Madge Bishop (Anne Charleston) and Harold Bishop (Ian Smith), and the death of "fan-favourite" Helen Daniels (Anne Haddy). In 2005, he wrote one of four novellas based on characters from the show. Kolle wrote for Neighbours until 2007. He also worked on fellow Australian soap operas Pacific Drive, Breakers, and Home and Away from 1998 until 2000. From 2003 until 2007, Kolle taught plotting and screenwriting at the Australian Film, Television and Radio School.

Kolle died suddenly on the night of 7 October 2026, in Sydney, at the age of 85. Fellow screenwriter Judith Colquhoun, who worked with Kolle on Bellbird, paid tribute, describing him as "full of ideas and generous with them." She recalled that while he always in demand and never out of work, Kolle's parents asked him when he was going to get a "proper job".

== Filmography ==
- In Melbourne Tonight – Comedy sketch writer
- Bellbird – Script editor, story editor, writer
- A Time for Love – Writer
- Homicide – Writer
- The Box – Script editor, story editor, writer
- The Bluestone Boys – Script editor, story editor, writer
- The Sullivans – Script editor, story editor, writer
- Skyways – Writer
- Cop Shop – Script editor, story editor, writer
- Water Under the Bridge – Writer
- Prisoner – Co-story editor and writer
- Punishment – Writer
- Sons and Daughters – Script editor, story editor, writer
- Starting Out – Development, story editor, writer
- Return to Eden – Story and script producer, writer
- Neighbours – Script producer, script editor, story editor, writer
- Richmond Hill – Writer
- Shortland Street – Writer
- Paradise Beach – Writer
- The Damnation of Harvey McHugh – Writer
- Unter uns – Creator and writer
- Pacific Drive – Writer
- Breakers – Writer
- Home and Away – Script editor, story editor, writer
- HeadLand – Story consultant
