= 1942 in Australian literature =

This article presents a list of the historical events and publications of Australian literature during 1942.

== Books ==
- James Aldridge — Signed With Their Honour
- Jean Devanny — The Killing of Jacqueline Love
- Arthur Gask — His Prey Was Man
- Michael Innes — The Daffodil Affair
- Eve Langley — The Pea-Pickers
- Will Lawson — Bound for Callao
- Philip Lindsay
  - The Gentle Knight
  - Heart of a King
- Nevil Shute
  - Most Secret
  - Pied Piper

== Children's and Young Adult fiction ==
- Mary Grant Bruce — Billabong Riders
- Mary Durack & Elizabeth Durack — A Book of Picture Stories
- Dorothy Wall — A Tiny Story of Blinky Bill

== Short stories ==
- John K. Ewers — "Harvest"
- Alan Marshall — "Blow Carson, I Say"
- Harold Mercer — The Adventures of Mrs. Parsley
- Ivan Southall — Out of the Dawn

== Poetry ==
- Ethel Anderson — Squatter's Luck and Other Poems
- Gina Ballantyne
  - "Vision"
  - Phantom
- Rosemary Dobson — "In a Convex Mirror"
- Mary E. Fullerton
  - "Lovers"
  - "Unit"
- Mary Gilmore — "Nationality"
- James McAuley — "Terra Australis"
- Leonard Mann — "The Earth"
- Ian Mudie — "Retreat of a Pioneer"
- Douglas Stewart — "Old Iron"
- Judith Wright — "The Company of Lovers"

== Non-fiction ==
- T. Inglis Moore — Six Australian Poets

== Drama ==
=== Radio ===
- Douglas Stewart – Ned Kelly

=== Theatre ===
- George Landen Dann – Fountains Beyond
- Sumner Locke Elliott – Goodbye to the Music

== Awards and honours ==
=== Literary ===
Award	Author	Title	Publisher
ALS Gold Medal	Kylie Tennant	The Battlers	Victor Gollancz, Ltd.

== Births ==
A list, ordered by date of birth (and, if the date is either unspecified or repeated, ordered alphabetically by surname) of births in 1942 of Australian literary figures, authors of written works or literature-related individuals follows, including year of death.

- 5 January — Michael Wilding, novelist and academic
- 9 February — Elizabeth Webby, literary scholar (died 2023)
- 9 April — James Cowan, author (died 2018)
- 20 April — Margaret Clark, writer for children
- 8 May — Peter Corris, novelist (died 2018)
- 10 May — Bob Ellis, journalist (died 2016)
- 10 June — Les Carlyon, newspaper editor and nonfiction writer (died 2019)
- 26 June — Humphrey McQueen, author
- 29 August — Gillian Rubinstein, writer for children
- 17 October — Nicholas Hasluck, novelist and jurist
- 20 October — Bob Graham, author and illustrator
- 27 October — Edwin Wilson, poet, painter, botanist (died 2022)
- 7 November — Helen Garner, novelist
- 12 November — Janette Turner Hospital, novelist

=== Unknown date ===
- David Williamson – playwright

== Deaths ==
A list, ordered by date of death (and, if the date is either unspecified or repeated, ordered alphabetically by surname) of deaths in 1942 of Australian literary figures, authors of written works or literature-related individuals follows, including year of birth.

- 19 January — Mary Gaunt, novelist (died in Cannes, France)(born 1861)
- 21 January — Dorothy Wall, writer for children (born 1894 in Wellington, New Zealand)
- 22 February — Furnley Maurice, poet (born 1881)
- 7 May — William Baylebridge, poet and short story writer (born 1883)
- 12 May — John Shaw Neilson, poet (born 1872)

== See also ==
- 1942 in Australia
- 1942 in literature
- 1942 in poetry
- List of years in Australian literature
- List of years in literature
