= Jean Blue =

Australian actress (1906–1984)

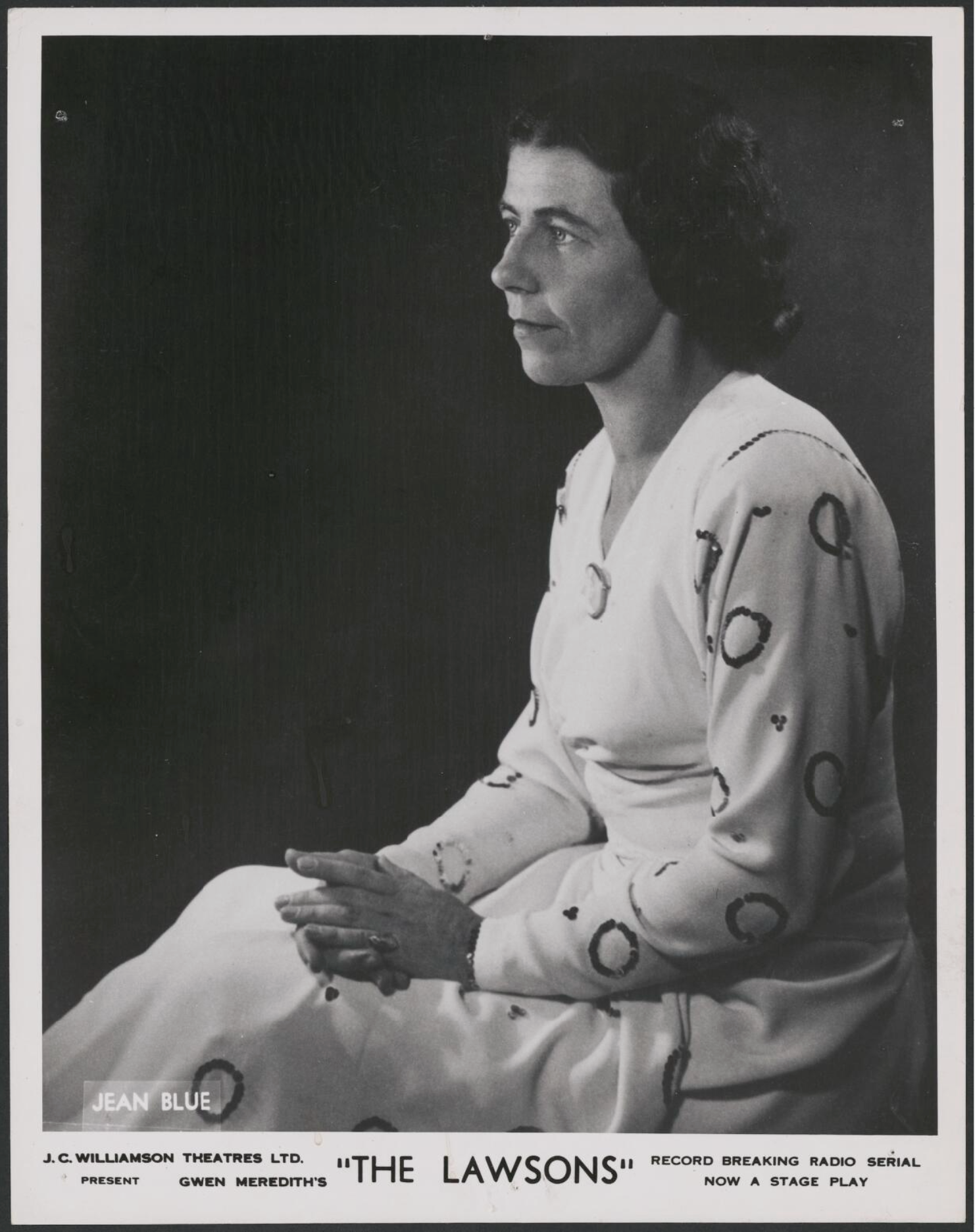
- Jean Blue in 1950
- Born: Jean Irwin Blue; 1906; Riverwood, New South Wales, Australia
- Died: 1984 (aged 78-79)
- Occupation: Actress
- Years active: c-1929-?

Jean Irwin Blue (1906–1984) was an Australian actress, director and producer, active on stage and screen, starting from the late 1920s.

== Biography ==
Blue was born to Dr Archibald Blue and Maud Howard Hutchins she is best known for The Overlanders. and Eureka Stockade. She worked extensively in theatre, particularly at the New Theatre in Sydney, which she joined in 1936 and then J.C. Williamson's. A notable role was the stage version The Lawsons, based on the radio series. Blue was also a trained nurse.

In 1946 she was fined for performing in a play What Happens to Love on the basis of it being an unlicensed venue.

== Select credits ==
=== Film ===
- The Overlanders (1946)
- Eureka Stockade (1949)
- Bitter Springs (1950)
- Captain Thunderbolt (1953)

=== Stage ===
- The Front Page (1929)
- Her Shop (1929)
- A Woman and Reality (1931)
- Waiting for Lefty (1936)
- Bury the Dead (1937)
- The Sword Sung (1938)
- Trumpets of Wrath (1938)
- Where's That Bomb? (1938)
- Six Men of Dorset (1938)
- Are You Ready Comrade (1939)
- Pastor Hall (1939)
- Blood on the Moon (1939)
- So It Didn't Work (with Plant in the Sun and Rehearsal) (1939)
- Where's That Bomb (1940)
- Stampede (1940)
- The Little Foxes (1944)
- Western Limit (1946) by Oriel Gray
- The Borgeouis Gentleman (1946)
- The Match Girls (1948)
- Woman Bites Dog (1947)
- Six Men of Dorset (1948)
- A Lion on the Square (1949)
- The Lawsons by Gwen Meredith (1950)
- The Good Hope (1950)
- All My Sons (1960)
- Tartuffe (1960)
- Lawson (1961) (revival)
- Our Dear Relations (1963)
- A Penny for a Song (1965)
