= In Beauty It Is Finished =

- Original language: English
- Written by: George Landen Dann

Premiere
- Date: July 18, 1931
- Place: His Majesty's Theatre, Brisbane

In Beauty It Is Finished is a three-act play by mid-twentieth century Australian playwright George Landen Dann. It was his first major play.

== Synopsis ==
In Beauty It Is Finished follows the story of Marion, a young white woman who lives for alternating years in Brisbane and with her parents on Moreton Island. The only other inhabitants of the island are Indigenous Australians and a lonely fisherman. Controversially, Marion begins a love affair with a "half-caste" boy named Tom. The play follows the effects the affair has on the surrounding family and community. In Beauty It Is Finished deals with themes of racism, identity, isolation and community as well as social expectations and ideals.

=== Characters ===
- David Edmond
- Mary Edmond
- Joyce
- Marion
- Tom Stepple
- Annie

== Background ==
Moreton Island can be seen from the shore of Sandgate where Dann lived. Dann took his character inspiration from the Ngugi people from Moreton Island. When the play was written in the 1930s, Queensland Indigenous Australians lived under the Aboriginals Protection and Restriction of the Sale of Opium Act 1897. This act affected the Indigenous population of Queensland with forced relocation to missions, the administration of Indigenous employment and wages as well as controlling permission to marry.

On Moreton Island the Indigenous population had been subject to many of the consequences of colonialism, including widespread disease and massacres. Many Indigenous Australians were moved to missions or sent to other islands or Brisbane. Many "half-caste" people lived in unauthorised fringe settlements with extremely poor conditions. These injustices prompted Dann to write about Indigenous Australians and their treatment by the government in his plays.

== Production and reception ==
In Beauty It Is Finished won the Brisbane Repertory Theatre Society's national playwriting competition in 1931.

For its premiere production for the Society at Brisbane's His Majesty's Theatre in 1931, Barbara Sisley was producer and director. On 16 July The Courier-Mail stated "It was selected unanimously on its dramatic values, and because of its earnestness of purpose. It is an intense play, relying for its power on the reactions of its characters to intense situations and deals with the lives of persons living on an island off the Queensland coast."

In Beauty It Is Finished was a highly controversial play at the time of its release, receiving many negative newspaper reviews. One local publication even claimed the play encapsulated 'sordid' content! Dann's play deals with inter-racial romance and friendship. Christian communities and newspapers discouraged people from seeing or engaging with the play. Despite this, however, the play attracted full houses.

The following year, the play was rejected by the Birmingham Repertory Theatre. On 28 December 1932 Dann was sent a letter explaining that the play had been rejected for reasons to do with the content.

In 1977, from 25 March to 23 April, Brisbane's La Boite Theatre Company produced In Beauty It Is Finished as part of the season Three Australian Plays. Dann died in June 1977.
