= La Boite Theatre Building =

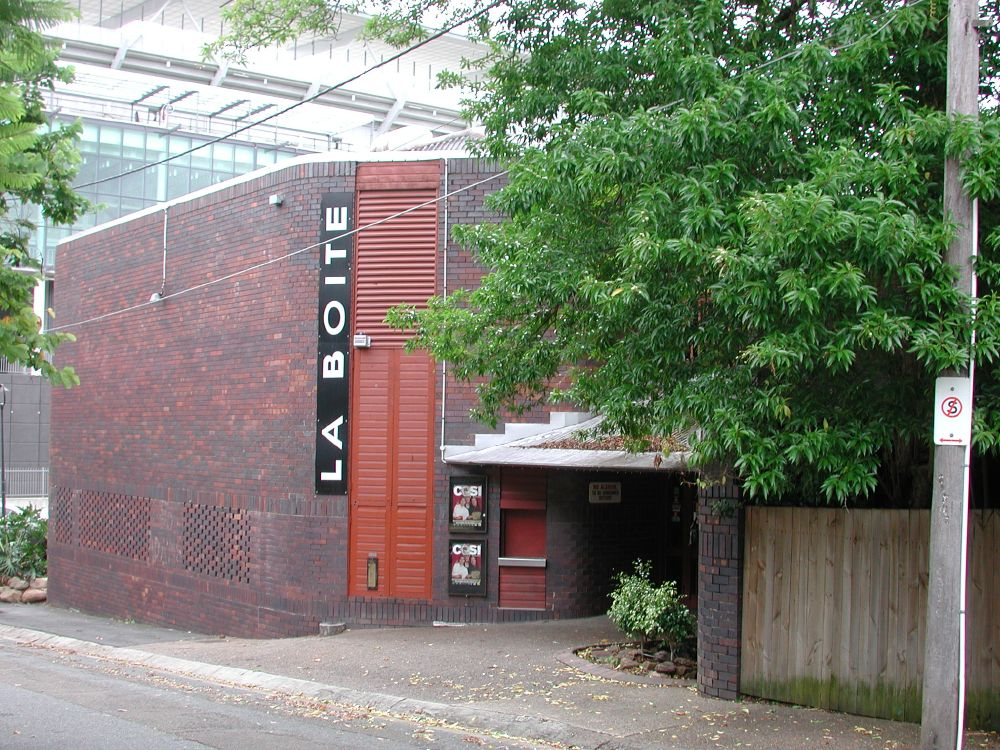
- La Boite Theatre, 2003

- Location within Queensland Location within Australia
- 27.4652°S 153.0111°E
- Location: 69 Hale Street, Petrie Terrace, City of Brisbane, Queensland, Australia

History
- Built: 1972

Site notes
- Architect: Blair Wilson

Queensland Heritage Register
- Official name: La Boite Theatre
- Type: state heritage (built)
- Designated: 30 January 2004
- Reference no.: 602171
- Significant period: 1972 (fabric); 1965–ongoing (social)
- Significant components: auditorium, foyer – entrance

La Boite Theatre Building is a heritage-listed former theatre at 69 Hale Street, Petrie Terrace, City of Brisbane, Queensland, Australia. It was designed by Blair Wilson and built in 1972. It was added to the Queensland Heritage Register on 30 January 2004.

== History ==
La Boite Theatre was built in 1972 to the design of Brisbane architect Blair Wilson for the Brisbane Repertory Theatre Company.

The Brisbane Repertory Theatre Society was founded in 1925 by a group of local theatre enthusiasts led by Barbara Sisley and Professor Jeremiah Joseph Stable. Their stated object was "to stimulate public interest and to promote public education in the drama and to promote and encourage the study and development of the best in dramatic literature and art." Their first play was "The Dover Road" by A. A. Milne. and in 1926 they performed an Australian play and decided that they would in future include at least one Australian play in each year's programme. In 1931 they held their inaugural Australian Playwriting Competition, the winning play causing controversy when it was performed because of its realistic subject matter and coarse language. It was a sign of things to come. The theatre company became known for its production of modern and innovative theatre. They are now Australia's oldest continuously running theatre company.

The group has performed in many theatres including Her Majesty's, the Bohemia, Cremorne, Theatre Royal, Rialto, Old and New Albert Halls and held a lease on the Princess Theatre for several years. However, one by one theatres closed and with the demolition of the Albert Hall in 1967, the last available and affordable venue for productions in the central city area was lost. The society looked for a way to continue productions and decided to establish a permanent home "where the theatre's image could flourish and members would be welcome at all times".

The society had acquired two timber cottages on the corner of Hale and Sexton Streets, Petrie Terrace in the late 1950s for use as clubrooms. They then purchased adjoining properties and decided to convert one of the houses into a theatre-in-the-round. There were several reasons for this decision. To begin with, there was no existing theatre in the round in Brisbane, even though some experimental productions in this style had been well received. In 1965 an experimental in the round performance was held in the converted house in Sexton Street.

Theatre in the round would extend the range of theatrical experience available to the Brisbane public and allow actors and directors to employ new techniques. There was an increasing overseas trend for more flexible performance space and a theatre in the round offered the simplest and cheapest way of achieving this. The equipment and scenery needed was not as elaborate as that required for a conventional theatre and seating capacity could be smaller so that an existing building could be utilised.

The converted cottage seated 65 people and opened for performances in June 1967. In spite of the small space and limited technical facilities, a lack of proper seating and air conditioning, the new theatre was an artistic success. It was named La Boite (The Box) to acknowledge its box-like shape.

Theatre-in-the-round, where the audience surrounds the players, is an ancient way of presenting performances but was new as a 20th-century theatrical form. It was an outcome of ideas developed in the first decades of the century in reaction to the restrictions of traditional theatre. At the time, theatres provided elaborate settings were the audience went to see and be seen and were seated on the ground floor and in rows of tiers and boxes facing a picture frame stage. Scenery and costumes were elaborate; acting was exaggerated in style and productions expensive to mount. Changes included simplification of settings and the use of lighting as an integral part of the performance, rather than just as means of illuminating the players.

In a reaction to the proscenium stage, a movement began in the mid-20th century to design theatres with the performing area placed centrally in the auditorium. The placing of the audience around the performers rather than in front of them permitted a much closer relationship between actors and audience to develop. Margo Jones in Dallas, Texas, who studied this concept and used it for productions, wrote an influential book on her work, Theater-in-the-Round (1951). Notable examples of theatres associated with developing this concept are the Arena Stage in Washington, DC, USA (1961) and the Royal Exchange in Manchester, England (1976). The remaining cottages at Milton were used as studio, workshop and storage areas. Brisbane Repertory Theatre mounted more than forty productions over the next four years and their space needs became pressing. Brisbane City Council approval for a new theatre replacing the converted house was granted in 1971. It was also to be a theatre in the round, though this time designed and built for the purpose. Blair Wilson of Brisbane firm R Martin Wilson & Sons created the design with input from the theatre's Artistic Director, Jennifer Blocksidge. It was the first purpose built arena theatre in Australia, the Ensemble Theatre in Sydney using a converted space for its performances.

The building construction was financed by a dollar-for-dollar grant of $40,000 from the Queensland Government in November 1971. The "dream theatre" designed by Blair Wilson was originally costed at $100,000, but it was found possible to reduce this to the available budget of $80,000 and retain the original design. This was done by modifying some details, reusing lighting and sound equipment from the old building and reducing costs for materials and finishes. The Queensland Governor, Sir Alan Mansfield, planted a time capsule in the foundations on 28 November 1971.

Utilising reject bricks that had chipped corners or minor irregularities of shape effected a major saving. Blair Wilson subsequently won the Industry Clay Brick Award for creative use of brick and the distinctive dark bricks forming a curvaceous box are a strong feature of the design. It was felt by a number of people visiting the theatre that the slight irregularities of the bricks imparted character and a demand for similar bricks were experienced by the supplier. Externally a small courtyard leading off the foyer proved a pleasant social space for use at intermission. The interior had tiers of seating on all four sides of the building surrounding a central stage. One bank of seats was made removable. The finish was simple and modern with a suspended black ceiling and exposed brick walls. Tunnels under the seating tiers allowed performers to move around the theatre without being visible.

The succeeding Governor, Sir Colin Hannah, officially opened the theatre on 11 June 1972. The Courier-Mail noted at the time that the Brisbane Repertory Theatre had made Australian theatre history by owning the first theatre in the country to be designed and built "in the round", a significant departure from traditional theatre design. Internal changes have occurred to the theatre since, but the essential design elements remain. In 1988 seats from the Expo 88 Russian Pavilion replaced the original seating.

Brisbane Repertory Theatre continued to be innovative and established the Early Childhood Drama Project in 1975 and held its first season of all Australian plays in 1980. In 1993 it became a professional company. As such, its needs were somewhat different than those of the amateur company for which the theatre was designed. There was a need for more space and, concurrently, the development of nearby Lang Park stadium reduced car parking for La Boite patrons, prompting consideration of a move. In 1996 La Boite incorporated as a non-profit organization.

The theatre was used as a venue by the Queensland Theatre Company in the 1970s and continued to be used by a variety of local occasional companies, as well as presenting an annual season of productions by La Boite Theatre Inc. Since 2000 the Company has also been using the Powerhouse Theatre for performances.

On 23 December 2001 it was announced that the theatre company would move to the new Creative Industries Complex of Queensland University of Technology at their Kelvin Grove campus, while administrative and rehearsal functions moved to the Thomas Dixon Centre at West End. Work began on the new theatre in 2002 and the Company moved into the new Roundhouse Theatre soon after.

The La Boite Theatre Building on Hale Street was sold and converted into commercial premises.

== Description ==
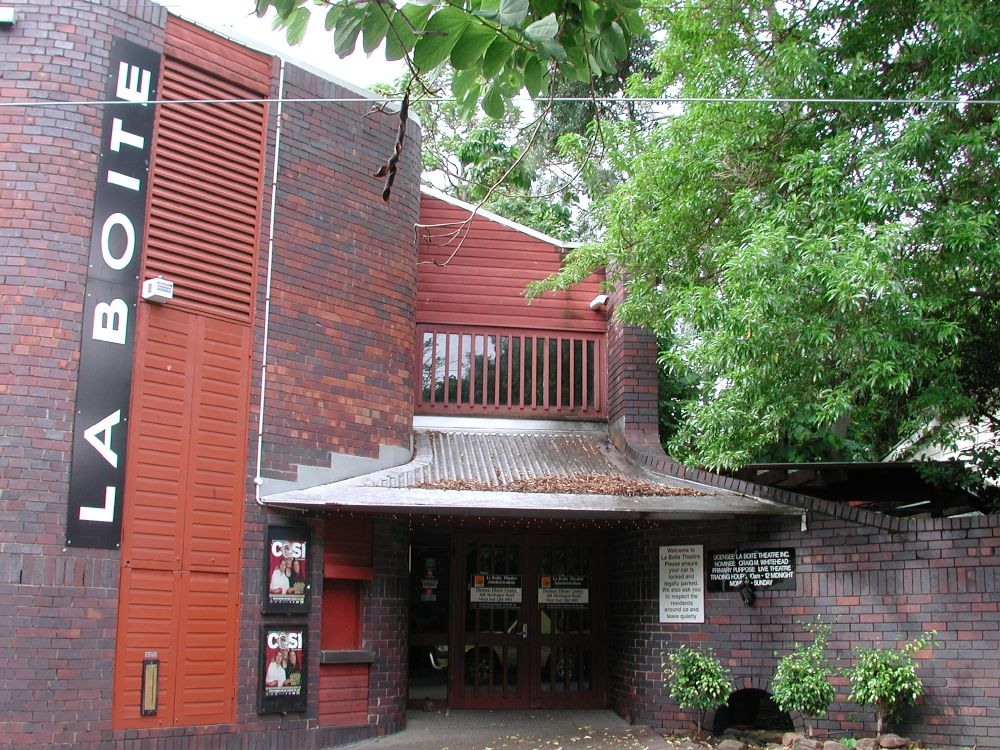
Theatre entrance with posters for the production Cosi, 2003

La Boite Theatre illustrates its name, being literally a box-shaped brick building with rounded corners. It is constructed of dark reject bricks with texture created by variations in the way in which the bricks are laid in the lower section. The roof is metal clad and low pitched.

The building is designed over three levels. On the ground floor is the foyer, flanked by small lobbies and a ticket office with the auditorium seating 200 behind it. This contains a central acting space with seating around it. Tunnels are located under the raked seating and provide access for the actors to different parts of the stage.

There is rehearsal space, a workshop, storage, office and dressing rooms in a basement area below the stage and a gallery above. A brick-paved courtyard opens off the foyer.

== Heritage listing ==
La Boite Theatre was listed on the Queensland Heritage Register on 30 January 2004 having satisfied the following criteria.

The place is important in demonstrating the evolution or pattern of Queensland's history.

La Boite Theatre illustrates the development of theatre in Queensland, as an arena theatre, which allowed the presentation of modern, flexible and intimate performances, reflecting trends in Europe and America, and rejuvenating amateur theatre in Queensland. It is also important as a purpose designed building for a longstanding and popular theatre company who have played an important role in the arts in Queensland.

The place demonstrates rare, uncommon or endangered aspects of Queensland's cultural heritage.

La Boite Theatre is rare as the first purpose designed theatre-in-the-round in Queensland.

The place is important because of its aesthetic significance.

The design for La Boite Theatre won a building industry award for the innovative use of material and is also innovative in form, the exterior expressing the name, which means "The Box" and was carried forward from the earlier theatre, converted from a cottage.

The place has a strong or special association with a particular community or cultural group for social, cultural or spiritual reasons.

La Boite Theatre is strongly connected with the development of the Brisbane Repertory Theatre Company, for which it was specifically designed and which has housed it for 30 years. The company took its name from the building when incorporated.
