= 1883 in Australian literature =

This article presents a list of the historical events and publications of Australian literature during 1883.

== Books ==
- Ada Cambridge — The Three Miss Kings
- Henrietta Dugdale — A Few Hours in a Far-Off Age
- Helen Mathers — Sam's Sweetheart
- Rosa Praed — Moloch : A Story of Sacrifice

== Poetry ==
- Victor J. Daley
  - "At the Opera"
  - "Dreams"
- John Farrell — "How He Died"
- Charles Harpur — Poems
- Douglas Sladen
  - Australian Lyrics
  - A Poetry of Exiles and Other Poems
  - "The Wentworth Falls, Blue Mountains"

== Short stories ==
- G. Herbert Gibson — Old Friends under New Aspects

== Births ==
A list, ordered by date of birth (and, if the date is either unspecified or repeated, ordered alphabetically by surname) of births in 1883 of Australian literary figures, authors of written works or literature-related individuals follows, including year of death.

- 16 March — Ethel Anderson, poet (born in England, died 1958)
- 1 August — Ethel Nhill Victoria Stonehouse, novelist and poet (died 1964)
- 4 December — Katherine Susannah Prichard, novelist (died 1969)
- 12 December — William Baylebridge, poet (died 1942)

== Deaths ==
A list, ordered by date of death (and, if the date is either unspecified or repeated, ordered alphabetically by surname) of deaths in 1883 of Australian literary figures, authors of written works or literature-related individuals follows, including year of birth.

- 5 January — Charles Tompson, poet (born 1807)

== See also ==
- 1883 in Australia
- 1883 in literature
- 1883 in poetry
- List of years in Australian literature
- List of years in literature
