= Caroline Chisholm =

English-born Australian humanitarian (1808–1877)

Servant of God Caroline Chisholm
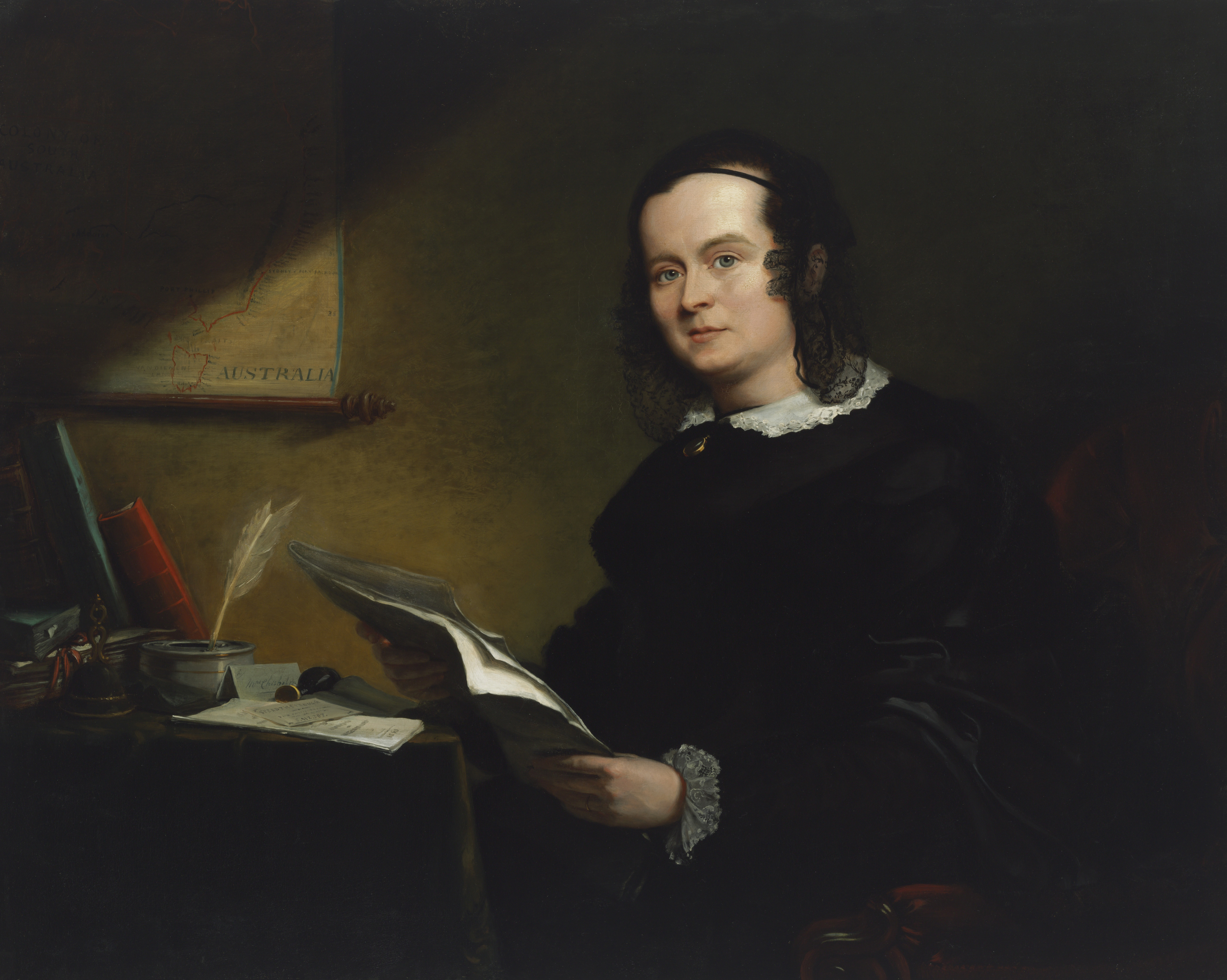
- Caroline Chisholm, 1852, by Angelo Collen Hayter
- Born: Caroline Jones; 30 May 1808; Northampton, England, UK
- Died: 25 March 1877 (aged 68); Highgate, London, England, UK
- Occupation: Humanitarian
- Years active: 1830−1866
- Known for: Humanitarian work, immigration reform
- Spouse: Archibald Chisholm
- Children: 8 children (including Caroline Agnes Gray)
- Parent(s): Sarah Jones, William Jones

Caroline Chisholm (/ˈtʃɪzəm/ CHIZ-əm; born Caroline Jones; 30 May 1808 – 25 March 1877) was an English humanitarian known mostly for her support of immigrant female and family welfare in Australia. She is commemorated on 16 May in the calendar of saints of the Church of England. Her path to sainthood within the Catholic Church has commenced; she had converted to Catholicism around the time of her marriage and reared her children as Catholic.

== Early life ==
Caroline Jones was born in 1808 in Northampton, England, the youngest of at least twelve children of her father, and the last of seven born to her mother. Her father, William Jones, had been widowed three times and Caroline was a daughter of William's fourth wife, Sarah. The family lived at 11 Mayorhold, Northampton. William Jones, who was born in Wootton, Northamptonshire, was a pig dealer who fattened young pigs for sale. He died in 1814 when Caroline was six. He left his wife £500 and bequeathed several properties to his twelve surviving children.

On 27 December 1830, Caroline, then 22, married Archibald Chisholm who was ten years her senior. He was an officer serving with the East India Company's Madras Army and a Roman Catholic. Around this time, Caroline converted to his faith, and they raised their children as Catholics. They were married at The Holy Sepulchre, Northampton, a Church of England church. Weddings conducted by Roman Catholic clergy were not recognised weddings until the Marriage Act 1836.

== Madras, India ==
Chisholm's husband returned to his regiment in Madras in January 1832. She joined him there 18 months later. Chisholm became aware that young girls growing up with their families in the barracks were picking up the bad behaviour of the soldiers. In 1834 she founded the Female School of Industry for the Daughters of European Soldiers, which provided a practical education for such girls. They were instructed in reading, writing and religion, cooking, housekeeping, and nursing. Soon soldiers asked if their wives could also attend the school.

While living in India, Chisholm gave birth to two sons, Archibald and William. The family followed her husband on his assignments around the Indian subcontinent.

== Sydney ==
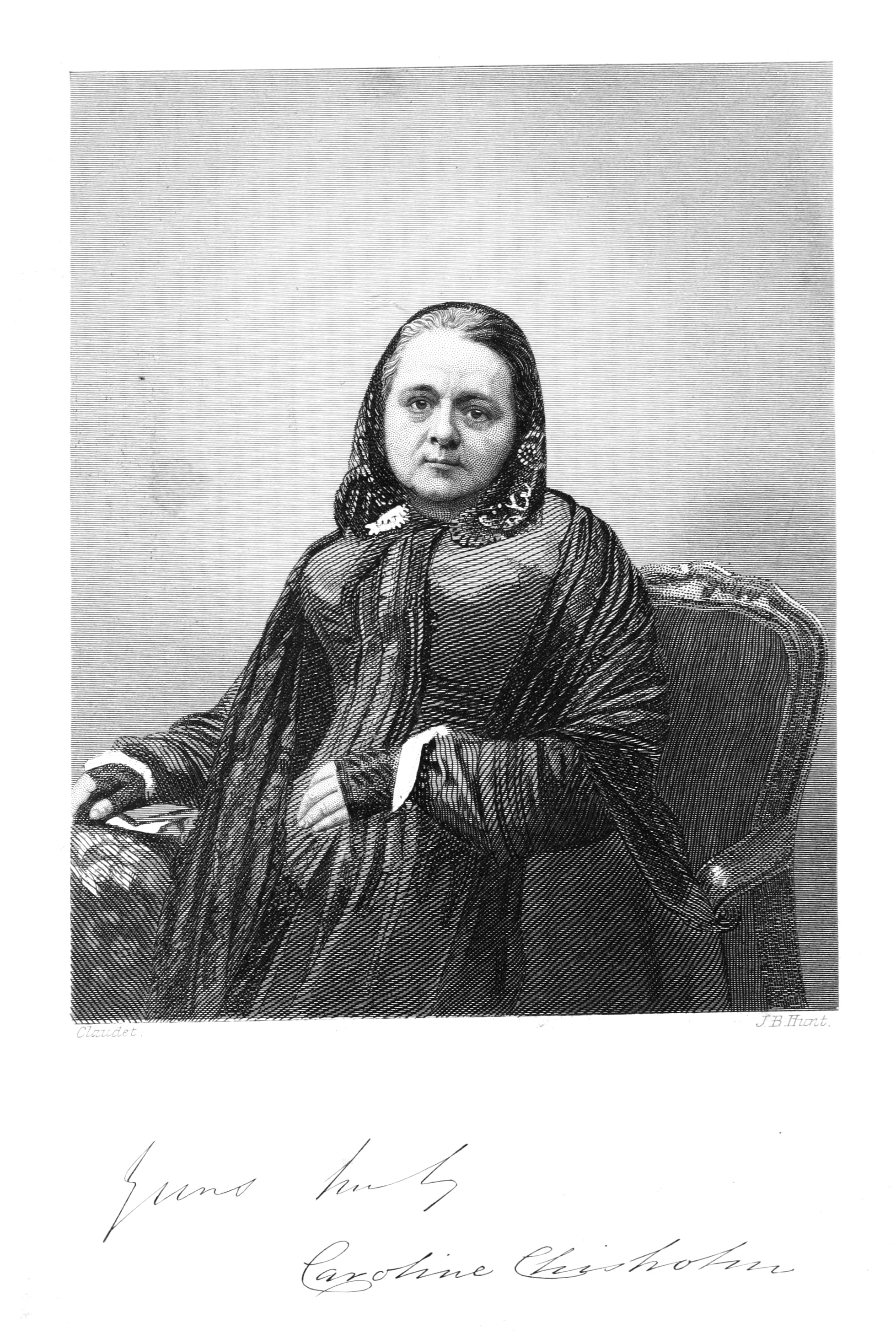
Caroline Chisholm by Claudet

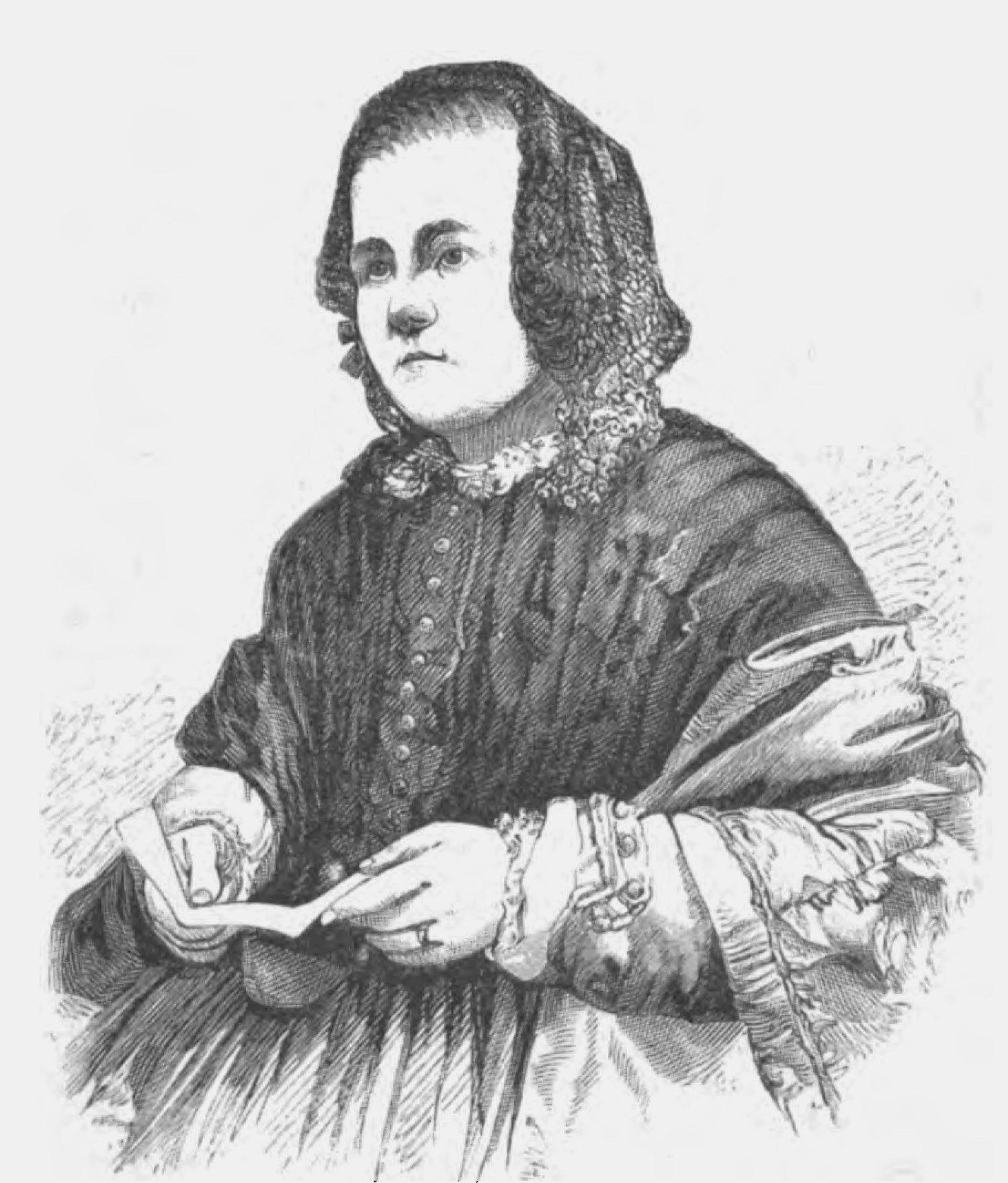
Caroline Chisholm

In 1838, Captain Archibald Chisholm was granted a two-year furlough on the grounds of ill health. Rather than return to England, the family decided the climate in Australia would be better for his health so they set sail for Sydney, aboard the Emerald Isle, arriving there in October 1838. The family settled at nearby Windsor.

On trips to Sydney, Chisholm and her husband became aware of the difficult conditions that faced immigrants arriving in the colony. They were particularly concerned for the young women who were arriving without any money, friends, family, or jobs to go to. Many turned to prostitution to survive. Chisholm found placement for these young women in shelters, such as her own, and helped find them permanent places to stay. She started an organisation with the help of the governess for an immigrant women's shelter. In 1840, Captain Chisholm returned to his regiment in India, but he encouraged his wife to continue her philanthropic efforts. She set up the first home in Sydney for young women and organised other homes in several rural centres. The home was soon extended to help immigrant families and young men.

In March 1842, Chisholm rented two terraced dwellings in East Maitland. She converted them into a single cottage to be used as a hostel for homeless immigrants who had travelled to the Hunter Valley in search of work. Now called Caroline Chisholm Cottage, it is the only building in New South Wales so directly associated with Chisholm. Built in the 1830s, the cottage offers a rare example of early working-class housing in New South Wales.

During the seven years when Chisholm was in Australia, she placed over 11,000 people in homes and jobs. She became a well-known woman and much admired. She was requested to give evidence before two Legislative Council committees. Chisholm carried out her work in New South Wales without accepting money from individuals or individual organisations, as she wanted to act independently. She did not want to be dependent upon any religious or political body. The girls and families whom Chisholm helped came from different backgrounds and held different religious beliefs. She raised money for the homes through private subscriptions. Her husband was invalided out of the Army and returned to Australia in 1845.

== Migration reforms and the Family Colonisation Loan Society ==
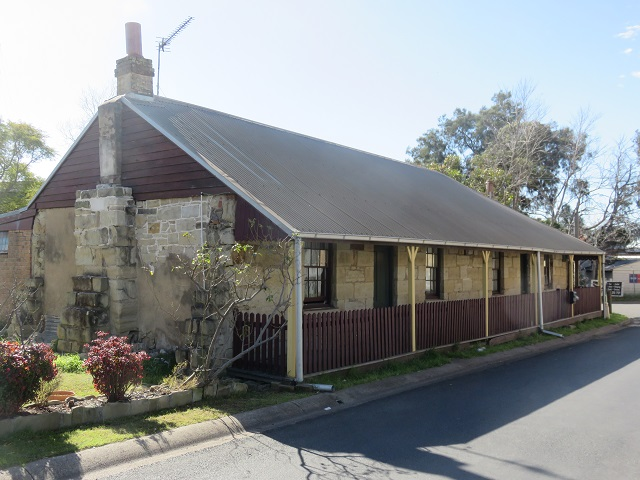
Caroline Chisholm Cottage in East Maitland

Before Chisholm and her husband returned to England in 1846, they toured New South Wales at their own expense, collecting over 600 statements from immigrants who had already settled there. Chisholm believed the only way to encourage emigration from England to Australia was for prospective emigrants to read letters from pioneers already living in the colony. In England, the couple published some of those statements in a pamphlet titled Comfort for the Poor – Meat Three Times a Day. The writer Charles Dickens used some of the statements in his new magazine Household Words. Chisholm's daughter, Caroline Agnes, was born in 1848, during the couple's time in London.

Chisholm gave evidence before two House of Lords select committees and gained support for some of her initiatives. The Committee supported providing free passage to Australia for the wives and children of former convicts, and for children who, through necessity, emigrants had left behind in England.

In 1849, with the support of Lord Shaftesbury, Sir Sidney Herbert, and Wyndham Harding, Chisholm founded the Family Colonisation Loan Society from her home in Charlton Crescent in Islington. The Society's aim was to support emigration by lending half the cost of the fare (the emigrant to provide the other half). After living two years in Australia, an emigrant would be expected to repay the loan.

Chisholm also held regular meetings at Charlton Crescent to give practical advice to emigrants. The Society initially found accommodation onboard private emigrant ships. Later, it chartered ships to transport emigrants. Chisholm's insistence that the Society's ships improve their accommodations resulted in the upgrading of the Passenger Acts. In 1851, her husband, Archibald Chisholm, returned to Australia to act as an honorary colonial agent, to help newly arrived migrants and to collect repayment of loans.

By 1854, the Society had assisted more than 3,000 people to emigrate to Australia. Chisholm gave emigration lectures throughout Britain, and also toured France and Italy. She collected their son William from the Propaganda College, where he had been studying to become a Roman Catholic priest. Chisholm had an audience with Pope Pius IX at the Vatican, who gave her a Papal Medal and bust of herself.

== Return to Australia and later life ==
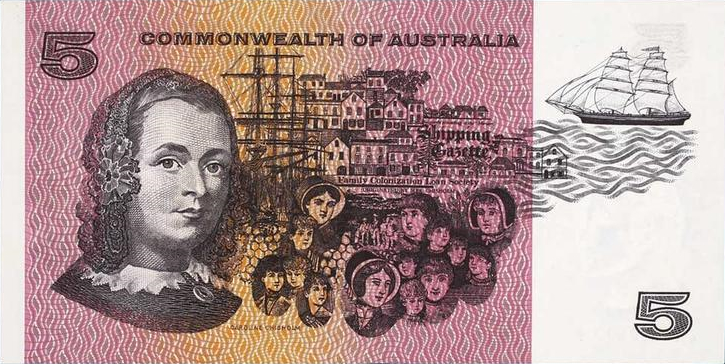
Caroline Chisholm was depicted on the reverse of the $5 note from 1966 to 1995

In 1854 Chisholm returned to Australia aboard the Ballarat. She toured the Victorian goldfields and was appalled by the conditions en route. She proposed the construction of shelter sheds about a day's walk apart so that prospectors and their families could travel to the work of the goldfields. The project received support from the government. Chisholm continued to work in Melbourne, travelling to and from the home and store which the Chisholms had purchased in Kyneton. She joined her family there three years later. Archibald served as a magistrate during his time in Kyneton, and the two elder sons helped him run the store.

Due to Chisholm's ill health, the family moved back to Sydney in 1858. Her health improved. At the end of 1859 and the beginning of 1860, Chisholm gave four political lectures. She called for land to be allocated so that emigrant families could establish small farms. She believed such action would provide greater stability among the new settlers in the colonies. Chisholm also wrote a novella, Little Joe, that was serialised in the local paper.

Her husband accompanied the younger children back to England in 1865. Archibald Jr. accompanied his mother on her return to England in 1866. Chisholm died in London, England on 25 March 1877, and her husband died in August that year. Five of their eight children survived their parents.

Chisholm's body was taken to her home town, Northampton, where it rested overnight in the Cathedral of Our Lady and St Thomas. She and her husband are buried in the same grave in Billing Road Cemetery.

== Legacy ==
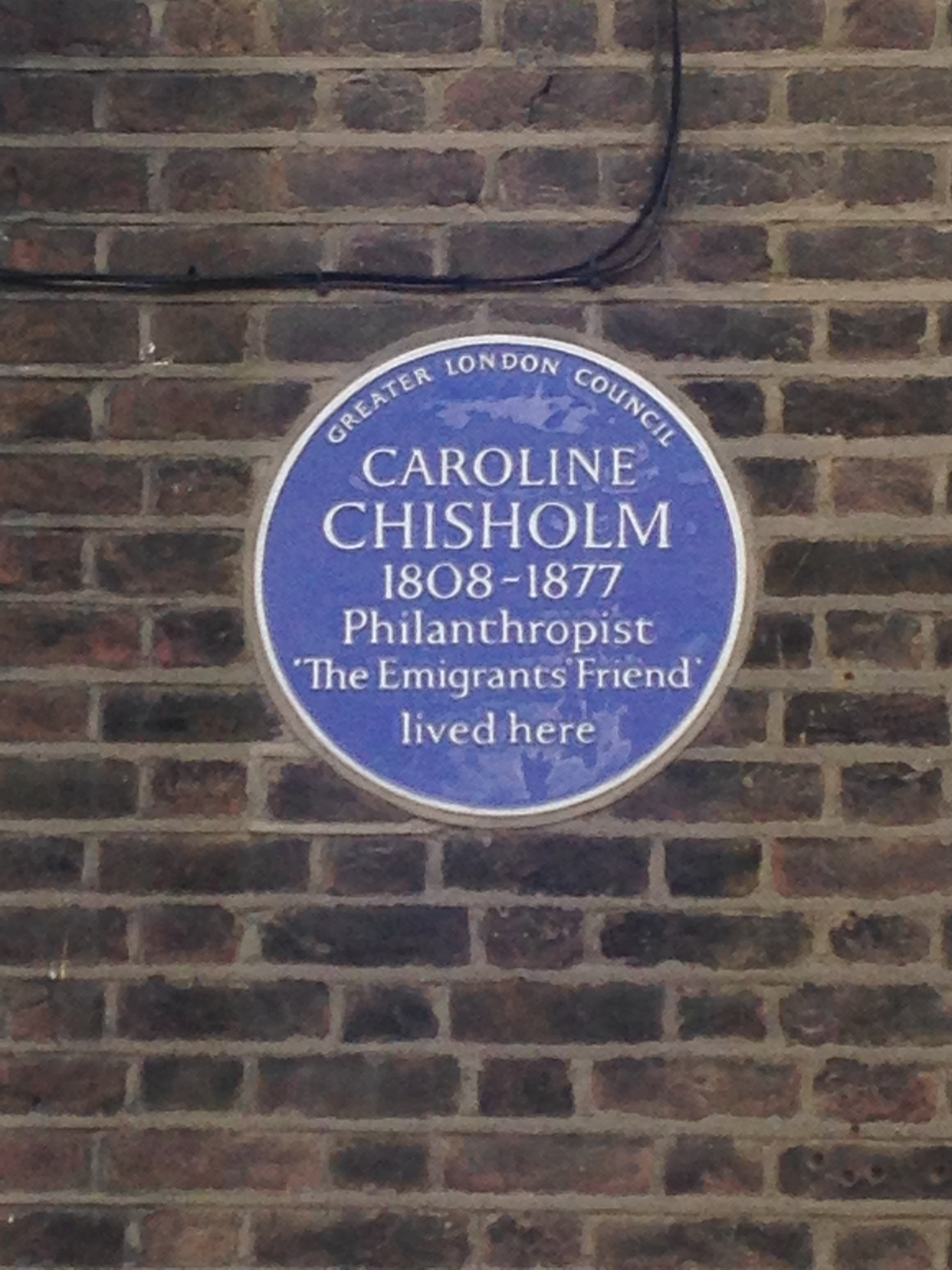
Plaque at 32 Charlton Place, Islington, London

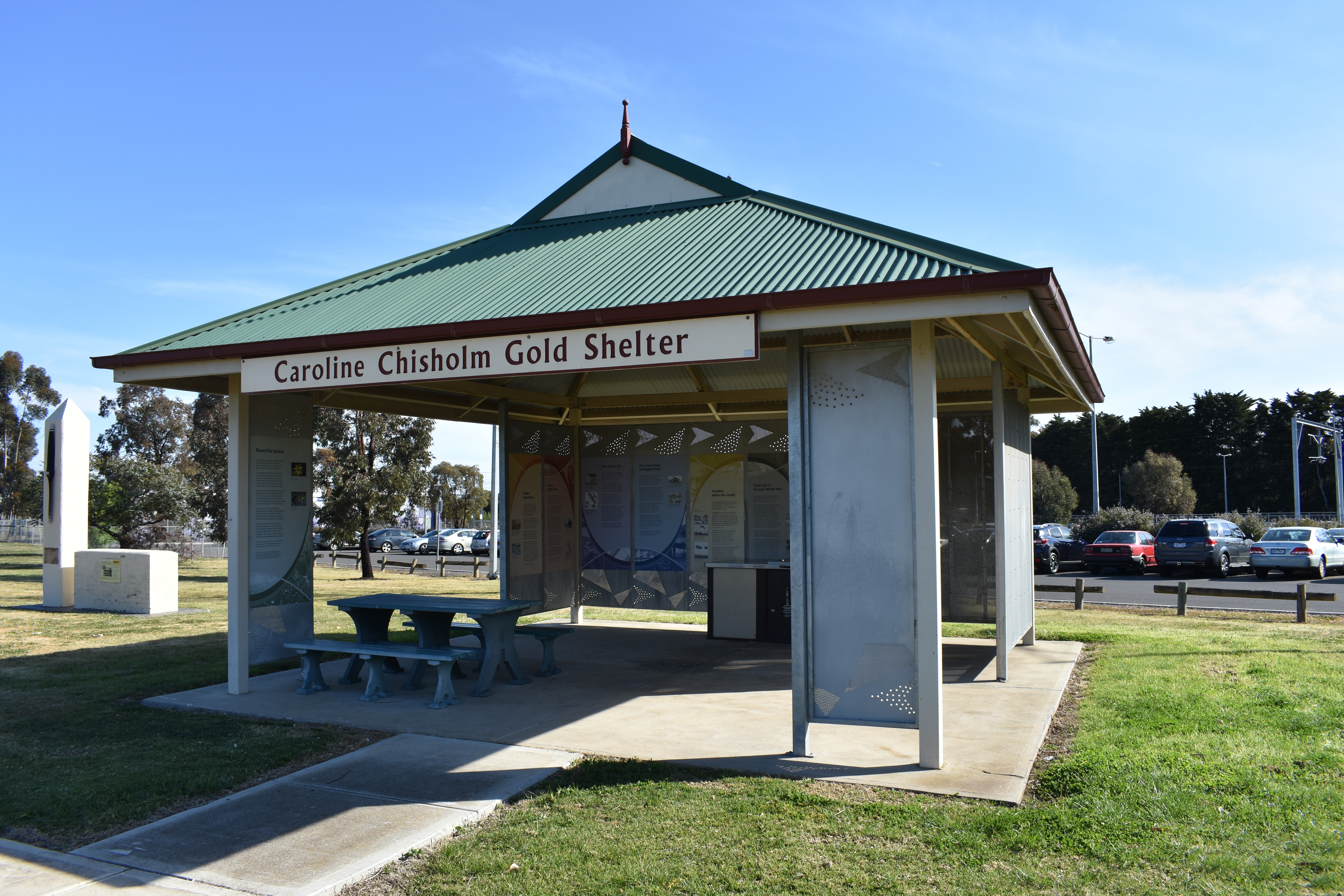
Caroline Chisholm Gold Shelter at Diggers Rest

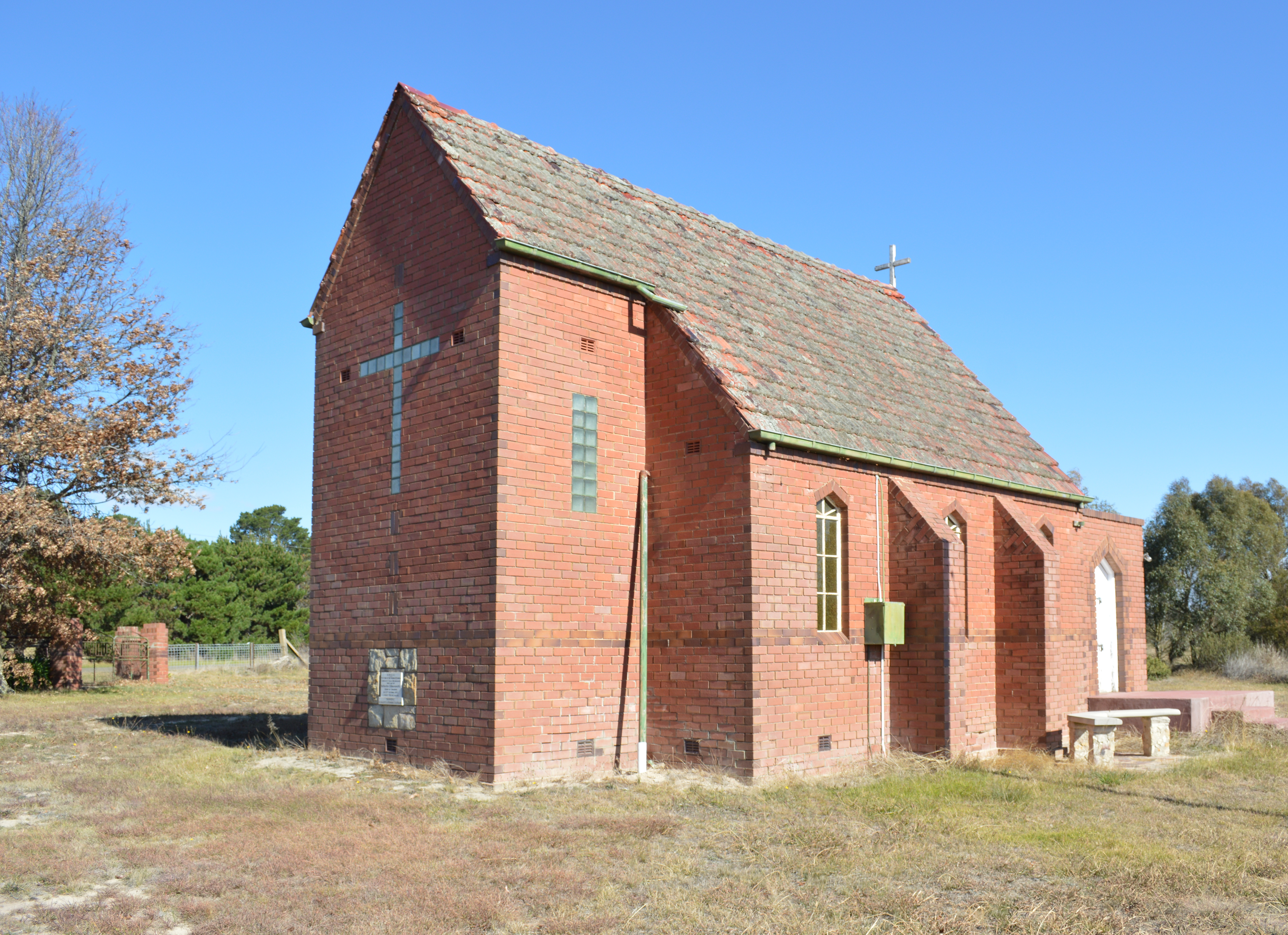
The Chisholm Memorial Church at Breadalbane

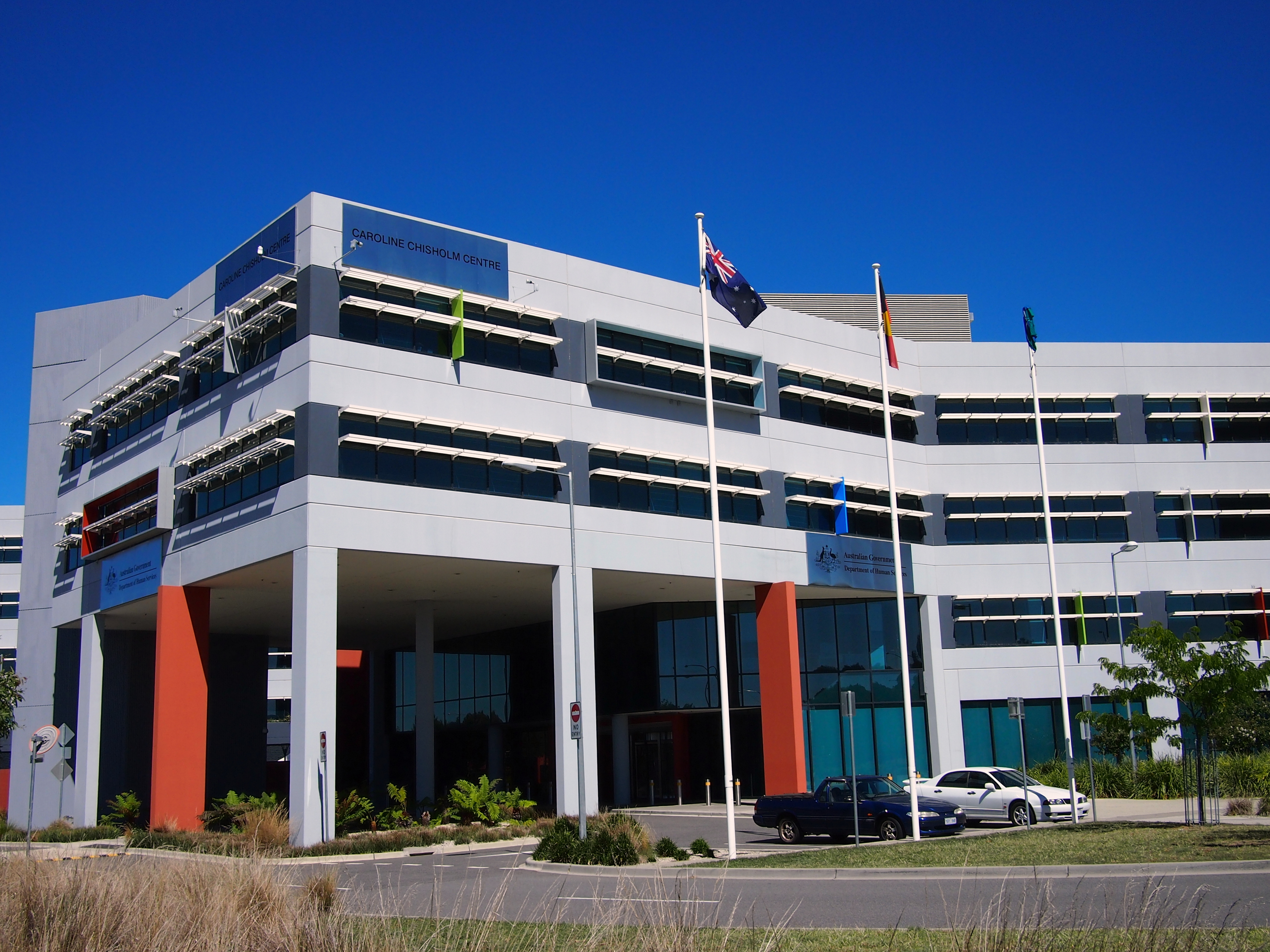
Caroline Chisholm Centre in Tuggeranong

- On 32 Charlton Place, Islington, London, a blue plaque commemorates Chisholm living there; it was erected in 1983 by Greater London Council.
- The Chisholm Memorial Church (St Silas' Anglican church) at Breadalbane was founded in 1937 and named for her.
- A number of educational facilities in Australia and England have been named after Chisholm.
- The Chisholm suburb of Canberra was named in her honour and a federal electoral division.
- She is a character in the novel The Valleys Beyond
- The Federal Government Services Australia headquarters, located in Tuggeranong (ACT), is named after her.
- Chisholm has been featured on Australian stamps and banknotes. She was also featured on the $5 note, 1967–91.
- The Caroline Chisholm Society is an Australian charitable organisation, established in 1969, that provides support and assistance to pregnant women and parents with young children.
- In Charles Dickens's novel Bleak House the character of Mrs Jellyby is said to be an amalgamation of three women of the period, including Chisholm.
- Caroline, a musical about her time in Australia by Peter Pinne and Don Battye, premiered in Melbourne in 1971.
- Chisholm is remembered in the Church of England calendar of saints with a commemoration on 16 May.
- She was posthumously inducted onto the Victorian Honour Roll of Women in 2001.

== See also ==
- Chisholm, Australian Capital Territory
- Caroline Chisholm (1939), play by George Landen Dann
- Caroline Chisholm School, an academy in south Northampton, England
- Caroline Chisholm School – Senior Campus in the Chisholm suburb of Canberra, Australian Capital Territory
- Caroline Chisholm College in Glenmore Park, New South Wales
- Caroline Chisholm Catholic College, Melbourne
- Chisholm Catholic College, Perth
- Paweł Strzelecki
