= Peter Pinne =

Australian writer and composer

- Born: Peter Norman Pinne; 27 May 1937 (age 89); Victoria, Australia
- Occupations: Television producer, writer, composer
- Partner: Don Battye (1960–1987)

Peter Norman Pinne (born 27 May 1937) is an Australian-born former television executive, writer and composer who has worked frequently in America and Great Britain.

== Career ==
Pinne started working for the television production company, the Reg Grundy Organisation, as a television executive. Firstly, as Head of Production from 1980, later rising to become a Senior Vice President of the company. During this period, he worked on numerous serials including The Young Doctors, The Restless Years and Neighbours.

He co-composed the theme tune to Sons and Daughters.

In 1992, he was responsible for overseeing the production of Dangerous Women, an American series based loosely on the popular Prisoner. The show was not a huge success running to only 52 one-hour episodes. He also travelled to a number of Latin American countries where he was responsible for overseeing the production of local versions of some of Grundy's most successful hits. He left the Grundy organisation in the late 1990s in order to set up his own record label, Bayview, with fellow former Australian television producer, Don Battye and now writes and composes music. He currently resides in the Brisbane area of Australia.

== Stage musicals ==
Since the late 1950s, Peter Pinne (variously working in collaboration with Don Battye, Ray Kolle and/or John-Michael Howson has been one of the most prolific creators of original Australian stage musicals. Examples include:

- All Saint's Day (1960) – based around Australian Rules Football
- Don't tell Helena (1962) – the misadventures of a society girl employed by a department store
- A Bunch of Ratbags (1966) – a rock musical set in the 1950s, adapted from the novel by William Dick
- It happened in Tanjablanca (1968); later revised as Red, White and Boogie (1974) – a murder mystery set in the 1940s
- The Computer/Love's Travelling Salesman (1970) – a double bill of one-act "pop operas"
- Caroline (1971) – based on the life of Caroline Chisholm
- Sweet Fanny Adams (1974) – the story of two rival whorehouses in 1930s Sydney
- A bit o' petticoat (1984) – based on The Torrents by Australian playwright Oriel Gray
- Pyjamas in Paradise (2005) – based on the popular "pyjama parties" held in Surfers Paradise in the 1950s
- Suddenly Single (2007)

Most of these musicals were originally performed as amateur or semi-professional productions. Although private demonstration recordings of the scores exist, few of the shows had commercial cast albums released. A song from A Bunch of Ratbags was released as a single, cover versions of two songs from The Computer and Love's Travelling Salesman were included on a 1970 compilation LP Australian Musicals Now, and a studio recording of selections from Red, White and Boogie and Sweet Fanny Adams was released in 1983 on Don Battye's Trigpoint label. The only stage production to generate a complete original cast recording was Caroline; the original LP was released in 1971 and subsequently re-issued on CD (by London-based label Dress Circle Records) in 1998.

Although all of Pinne's musicals were successful in their original productions, few of them have been mounted since. A Bunch of Ratbags was revived in 2005 by Magnormos, which resulted in the release of a "premiere" cast recording. In 2007, Magnormos staged a 30-minute workshop production of Pinne's latest musical, Suddenly Single, which was written in collaboration with Paul Dellit.

In the mid-1990s, Pinne and Battye also wrote a stage musical adaptation of the cult 1970s Australian television series, Prisoner: Cell Block H. The show was first produced in England (where the original series had become more popular than in Australia), in a lavish West End production that starred Lily Savage and original TV cast member Maggie Kirkpatrick, reprising her role as Joan "The Freak" Ferguson.

== Pantomime ==
In addition, Pinne and Battye co-wrote a number of pantomime-like musicals especially for children, which were produced at the Alexander Theatre at Monash University during the 1970s. Mostly based on popular fairy tales, these shows included:

- The Shoemaker and the Elves (1975)
- Jack and the Beanstalk (1976)
- Billabong Bill (1976)
- The Little Tin Soldier (1977)
- The Emperor's New Clothes (1978)
- Rumpelstiltskin
- Beauty and the Beast

== Books ==
- Australian performers, Australian performances : a discography from film, TV, theatre, radio and concert, 1897–1985 (1987) (ISBN 0-72418208-X)
- Albert Moran; with additional research by Peter Pinne (1993). Moran's guide to Australian TV series. North Ryde, N.S.W. : Australian Film Television and Radio School : distributed in Australia and New Zealand by Allen & Unwin. ISBN 0-642-18462-3.
- music; lyrics by Peter N. Pinne; book; lyrics by Don Battye. Adapted from the novel by William Dick' (1988). A bunch of ratbags. Montmorency, Vic. : Yackandandah. ISBN 0-7316-3897-2.
- Peter N. Pinne and Don Battye. (1981). Caroline, a musical play based on the life and times of Caroline Chisholm. Brisbane : Playlab Press. ISBN 0-908156-13-8.
- Peter N. Pinne and Don Battye. (1989). Red, white and boogie. Montmorency, Vic. : Yackandandah. ISBN 0-86805-071-7.
- book; lyrics by Ray Kolle; music by Peter Pinne; Based on 'The Torrents' by Oriel Gray (1992). A bit o' petticoat : a musical. Montmorency, Vic. : Yackandandah. ISBN 0-86805-085-7.
