= My Life is my Affair =

My Life is my affair
- Written by: Oriel Gray
- Original language: English

Premiere
- Date premiered: 1946
- Place premiered: Wagga School of Arts, Wagga Wagga

My Life is My Affair is a 1946 Australian play by Oriel Gray. It won first prize in the Wagga one act play competition. The play was performed in Wagga Wagga and in Sydney.

== Reception ==
The Sydney Morning Herald said the play had "sincerity and dramatic force... and, in addition, a saving grace of humour.. The shattering of dream worlds, the recovery of sane values, and the achievement of equality between husband and wife are worked out with skill and neatness, and with a deep and subtle under- standing of human nature."

== Premise ==
The rehabilitation of a married serviceman, his wife, his mother and his lover.
