= Caroline (musical) =

Musical about 19th century social reformer

Caroline is a musical with music and lyrics by Peter N. Pinne and book and lyrics by Don Battye from an idea by Leila Blake. It concerns the life and times of Caroline Chisolm, a nineteenth century social reformer known for her work for the welfare of female immigrants in colonial Australia.

It premiered at St Martin's Theatre in Melbourne in February 1971, directed by Jon Ewing. The cast included Leila Blake, Geoff Hiscock, Cindy Wright, Ian Smith, Geraldene Morrow, Bryon Williams, Patsy Hemingway, John Frawley, Lesley Baker, Brent Verdon, Carole Walker, Rod Anderson, Karin Murphy and Kevin Howard. The production toured to Canberra after its Melbourne season.

The Age described the original production as "a large and ambitious venture which attempts rather too much", but also that "it has some fine episodes and it rings true all the time" and it "should not be missed".

A cast album was released, and re-released on CD in 1998 by Dress Circle.
