= The Damnation of Harvey McHugh =

Television series

- Created by: John Misto
- Starring: Aaron Blabey; Monica Maughan; Philip Quast
- Composer: Chris Neal
- Country of origin: Australia
- Original language: English
- No. of seasons: 1
- No. of episodes: 12

Production
- Executive producer: Penny Chapman
- Producer: Sue Masters
- Production locations: Melbourne, Australia

Original release
- Network: ABC
- Release: 2 June – 18 August 1994

The Damnation of Harvey McHugh is an Australian television miniseries made by the ABC. The series consists of 12 episodes and was first broadcast on the ABC in 1994 from 2 June to 18 August of that year.

== Overview ==
The series was created by John Misto and co-written by Misto, Graeme Koetsveld and Ray Kolle.

It was produced by Penny Chapman and the episodes were variously directed by Michael Carson, Robert Klenner, Geoffrey Nottage and Amanda Smith.

== Cast ==
=== Main cast ===
- Aaron Blabey as Harvey
- Monica Maughan as Harvey's mother, Mrs McHugh
- Philip Quast as ’The Minister’, Michael Muldoon.

=== Supporting cast ===
- Ronald Faulk as Dr. Voysner
- Richard Piper as Gordon Robertson
- Roger Oakley as Bernard
- Daniel Rigney as Frank
- Jane Borghesi as Gina
- Bruce Myles as Father Healy
- Emma Strand as Diane
- Michael Burkett as Morris
- Robin Ramsay
- Simon Chilvers as Douglass
- Frank Gallacher as Sergeant Dale
- Louise Siversen as Annette

=== Guests ===
- Aaron Jeffery as Brandon
- Alex Menglet as Sasha
- Frances O'Connor as Georgina
- Gerald Lepkowski as Detective
- Lewis Fitz-Gerald as Trevor Martin
- Sarah Chadwick as Kathryn
- Spencer McLaren as Young Matildan
- Terry Norris as Judge Brown

== Synopsis ==
This sharp black comedy, with strong elements of political satire, follows the misadventures of a naive young clerk, Harvey McHugh, as he tries to secure a permanent position in the Australian Public Service. As his quest progresses, Harvey gains many startling insights into how the Australian government and bureaucracy operates behind the scenes, especially through his dealings with the powerful and manipulative politician, Michael Muldoon—invariably referred to simply as "The Minister"—who heads the department where Harvey is employed.

The production of the series received considerable coverage in the press at the time it was being made. After production had begun, the ABC took the unusual (and costly) step of scrapping several completed episodes, because it was felt that the mood was too 'dark'.

== Critics response ==
The series was well received by critics. Quast was widely praised for his portrayal of the Minister, Blabey won the 1995 AFI Best Actor Award for his portrayal of Harvey and Monica Maughan won a Silver Logie and an AFI Best Actress Award for her performance.
