= Don Battye =

Australian television producer

- Born: Donald Gordon Battye; 29 September 1938; Richmond, Melbourne, Australia
- Died: 28 February 2016 (aged 77); Puerto Princesa City, Palawan, Philippines
- Occupations: Television producer; scriptwriter; writer; composer
- Years active: 1969–2016
- Partner: Peter Pinne (1960–1987)

Donald Gordon Battye (29 September 1938 – 28 February 2016) was an Australian composer, writer and television producer, best known for his work with Crawford Productions and Reg Grundy Organisation (known then as Reg Grundy Productions).

== Biography and career ==
Battye worked on several Crawford Productions television serials as a writer, script editor, and producer including soap opera The Box in 1976 and 1977, The Sullivans and police procedural drama series Division 4, Bluey (1976) and Homicide.

Battye and business partner Peter Pinne wrote children's musicals which premiered at the Alexander Theatre, Monash University, from 1973 to 1980. as well as the adult musicals All Saints' Day, Don't Tell Helena, A Bunch of Ratbags, It Happened in Tanjablanca, Red White * Boogie, Sweet Fanny Adams, Caroline, The Computer and Love Travelling Salesman (2 folk operas) and Prisoner Cell Block H, the Musical.

He later worked for Reg Grundy Productions, (later changed to the Grundy Organization) as Senior Vice President Drama Development which in that capacity made him producer and executive producer on such programmes as the action series Chopper Squad, which first took him to join the company, police procedural drama series Bellamy (1981) and soap operas, The Restless Years (1981), for which he also wrote over 100 episodes, Sons and Daughters for which he also wrote over 150 episodes (1982), Waterloo Station (1983), Possession (1985) and Neighbours (also 1985). Battye was Executive Producer of Neighbours from 1988–1992 and wrote for the program until the year 2000. Battye co-composed the famous theme song to Sons and Daughters with Pinne, plus two songs for inclusion in Neighbours.

He produced and composed music from the Philippines where he had resided since 1998. He wrote a memoir which encompassed his life from being a child actor to a senior television executive.

He and Brian Kavanagh wrote the screenplay A City's Child.

== Death ==
Battye died on 28 February 2016 in Palawan, Philippines. Rick Maier, the Head of Drama at Network Ten, and Jason Herbison, the series producer of Neighbours, paid tribute to Battye. Maier commented, "It is with great sadness we note the passing of our friend Don Battye. A prolific producer and writer, Don was highly respected throughout the industry, both for his work with Crawford Productions and Grundy Television. As Executive Producer of Neighbours (1988 to 1992) and many other popular shows for Ten, he may well have launched a thousand careers. Generous with his time and his knowledge, Don will always remain one of the best." Herbison called him "a true legend in the Australian television industry." An In Memoriam card was displayed at the end of the credits for "Episode 7311" of Neighbours, acknowledging Battye's death and work on the show.

== Books ==
- Peter N. Pinne and Don Battye. (1988). A bunch of ratbags. Montmorency, Vic.: Yackandandah. ISBN 0-7316-3897-2. (Adapted from the novel by William Dick)
- Peter N. Pinne and Don Battye. (1981). Caroline, a musical play based on the life and times of Caroline Chisholm. Brisbane : Playlab Press. ISBN 0-908156-13-8.
- Peter N. Pinne and Don Battye. (1989). Red, white and boogie. Montmorency, Vic. : Yackandandah. ISBN 0-86805-071-7.
