= Prisoner Cell Block H: The Musical =

Prisoner Cell Block H: The Musical is a stage musical based on the Australian television series Prisoner (also known as Prisoner Cell Block H) created by Reg Watson.

The concept, music and lyrics where devised by Don Battye and Peter Pinne.

After previews from 23 October 1995, the musical opened on 30 October 1995 at the Sondheim Theatre (formerly The Queens Theatre) in London's West End. It closed on 13 January 1996. The cast featured Lily Savage and Maggie Kirkpatrick.
