= Jill Shearer =

Australian playwright

- Born: 14 April 1936; Melbourne, Victoria, Australia
- Died: 6 May 2012 (aged 76); Brisbane, Queensland, Australia
- Occupation: Playwright
- Writing career
- Pen name: Flora McKay
- Period: 1971–2007

Jill Patricia Shearer (14 April 1936 – 6 May 2012) was an Australian playwright who also wrote as Flora McKay. One play, Shimada, was produced on Broadway.

Shearer was born in Melbourne, Victoria on 14 April 1936. She moved to Queensland and was educated at Brisbane Girls Grammar School.

Shearer began writing stories for children in 1971, four of them were published in Bedtime Stories for Young Australians. Her two-act play Catherine won a special merit prize in the 1976 Alexander Theatre Playwriting Competition.

She won the 1977 Utah-Cairns Centenary Play Writing Competition for her play, The Kite, and was subsequently interviewed by Hazel de Berg.

She wrote a number of full-length and one-act plays. Her play, Shimada, was first performed by the Melbourne Theatre Company at the Russell Street Theatre in April 1987. It played in New York's Broadway in 1992. The play's theme was the conflict experienced when a Japanese man plans to take over a Queensland business.

She wrote Georgia about the American painter, Georgia O'Keeffe, focusing on her later life and sight loss to macular degeneration. It was joint winner of the 1997 George Landen Dann Award and commended at the 1999 Matilda Awards.

Shearer wrote an autobiography Nowhere but Broadway, published in 2002.

She died in Brisbane on 6 May 2012. Her manuscripts and papers are held in the John Oxley Library at the State Library of Queensland, the Trove summary claims she was the first Australian woman to have a play performed on Broadway.

== Selected plays ==
- But I Won't Wear White (1972)
- Ships that Pass (1973)
- Who the Hell Needs Whipbirds (1974)
- The Foreman (1976)
- Catherine (1977)
- The Kite (1977)
- The Boat (1978)
- The Family
- Shimada (1987), produced on Broadway in 1992
- Georgia, about the later life of Georgia O'Keeffe (1997)
