= Wyndham Harding =

English civil engineer and philanthropist (1817–1855)

Wyndham Harding (1817–1855) was an English civil engineer and philanthropist.

== Biography ==
He was Secretary of the London and South-Western Railway Company.

He was awarded the Telford Medal of the Institution of Civil Engineers in 1847, and elected a Fellow of the Royal Society in 1852, his citation reading " The Author of A Paper "on the Laws of the Resistances experienced in Railway Trains," (printed in the Transactions of the Institution of Civil Engineers and used in the new edition of Tredgold on the Steam-Engine. "On the Statistics of the Railway system of Great Britain" (printed in the Journal of the Statistical Society). Of a Lecture, delivered to the Government School of Design, "on Geometry applied to the arts of design." Distinguished for his acquaintance with mathematical and mechanical science, and with the applications of Mechanical & Statistical results. "

Apart from being an active supporter of Mechanics’ Institutes, Benefit Societies, and similar institutions, he expended a large portion of his wealth in promoting systematic emigration. As a philanthropist, he earned the well-merited gratitude of hundreds, whom he assisted in procuring a free passage to Australia, or to whom he advanced loans for that purpose, including working with Caroline Chisholm.

"The inhabitants of Southampton will long remember the day when Mrs. Chisholm and Mr. Harding met, to witness the departure of the first Australian emigrant-ship which sailed from that port, freighted, under her superintendence, at his expense and risk."
