= Had We But World Enough =

Australian play by Oriel Gray

Had We But World Enough is a 1950 Australian play by Oriel Gray.

The play made its debut in 1950 at the New Theatre.

== Plot ==
A school teacher casts an Aboriginal girl as the Virgin Mary in a play.

== Reception ==
The Age called it "well worth seeing."

The Adelaide News liked the first half.

== Legacy ==
The play is now commonly regarded as being ahead of its time in its treatment of race relations in Australia. It was published in 2018.
