= Drive a Hard Bargain =

1957 Australian play by Oriel Gray

- Written by: Oriel Gray
- Original language: English

Premiere
- Date premiered: October 1957
- Place premiered: Ballarat Civic Hall, Ballarat

Drive a Hard Bargain is a 1957 Australian play by Oriel Gray.

It won a one act play competition in 1957 by the South Street Society. Adjudicator Lindsay Browne of the Sydney Morning Herald called it "a delight to read for the vivacity of the plot, dialogue, Aussie humour and shrewd categorisation." The play, along with two others, was presented in 1957 at South Street.

The play was also filmed for Australian television by the ABC in 1964.

Leslie Rees called it "a very popular one-acter... As in other Oriel Gray plays, there was here a lack of sufficient dramatic clash to warm a potentially dramatic situation—but artifices of character and vivacity of bush dialogue carried the day for this sprightly modern moralityin-little."

A written edition of the play was published by the Tasmanian Adult Education Board in 1958.

== Premise ==
According to ABC Weekly, "The play is on a theme as old as literature, the Mephistophelean theme telling how the Devil in man’s disguise wanders the earth seeking to buy men’s souls. Kate Cleary, a middle-aged woman with great strength of character, runs a country pub with the help of her adopted daughter, Peggy. Peggy, a self-assured half-castc girl, is in love with a stockman. Whip."

== Radio adaptation ==
The work was adapted for Australian radio in 1958.

== Television adaptation ==
The play was filmed by the ABC in 1964. It was shot in Hobart, Tasmania and was directed by John Baldwin. It was the second television play filmed in Hobart; the first had been The Happy Journey in 1963.

=== Cast ===
- Junee Cornell as Kate Cleary
- Gilliam Hunter as Peggy
- Max Oldaker as Mr. Nicholas
- Joan Coombe as The Blonde
- Roger Triffitt as Whip O'Connor
- John Tyde as Bart
- Peter Dye as Geoff
