= A Time for Love (TV series) =

- Genre: Anthology
- Country of origin: Australia
- Original language: English
- No. of episodes: 10

Production
- Producer: James Davern
- Production location: Melbourne
- Running time: 30 minutes
- Production company: ABC

Original release
- Network: ABV-2
- Release: 29 March – 31 May 1972

A Time for Love is an Australian television anthology series that originally aired on ABV-2 from 29 March 1972. ABC commissioned ten Australian writers to create self-contained stories about love. It was similar to the British anthology series Love Story, but the stories featured in A Time for Love are "a very broad interpretation of love in Australia". The series was produced in Melbourne by James Davern. It received a mixed reaction from television critics.

== Production ==
On 11 January 1972, A Time for Love was included in ABC's prime-time program line-up for 1972. Valda Marshall from The Sydney Morning Herald reported that the series would be made up of ten, self-contained love stories. Ten Australian writers were commissioned to write the 30 minute episodes, which were produced in Melbourne. A Time for Love was similar in style to the British anthology series Love Story. However, series producer James Davern explained that the love stories featured in A Time for Love would not be "the boy-meets-girl type nor the narrow type of romantic interchange of the BBC's Love Story." He continued: "It is a very broad interpretation of love in Australia with anything from the relationship between two mates, to the love between two sisters, to the love between a lazy Australian and his domineering German wife." Davern said some of the stories could only happen in Australia, like the "male ethos of the boys round the barrel". Pat Dreverman of The Age reported that the first story would air on ABV-2 on 29 March 1972. Davern did not expect the series to rate highly, but said that the anthology format would "stimulate people intellectually and emotionally".

A Time for Love was quickly followed by another anthology series Quartet.

== Cast ==
- Anne Pendlebury ("Claire and the Counter Revolutionary")
- Mark Albiston ("Claire and the Counter Revolutionary")
- Bruce Kilpatrick ("Claire and the Counter Revolutionary")
- Bunney Brooke ("One Room in a Mansion")
- Cindy Wright ("One Room in a Mansion")
- John Bowman ("One Room in a Mansion")
- John Stanton ("And Mother Used to Sing")
- Jill Forster ("And Mother Used to Sing")
- Syd Conabere ("And Mother Used to Sing")
- Jane Colebrook ("And Mother Used to Sing")
- Paula Maxwell ("And Mother Used to Sing")
- David Phillips ("And Mother Used to Sing")
- Anne Charleston ("Birds of a Feather")
- Barry Hill ("Birds of a Feather")
- John Morris ("Birds of a Feather")
- Gerda Nicolson ("Noises in Another Room")
- Audine Leith ("Noises in Another Room")
- Lindsay Edwards ("Noises in Another Room")
- George Walsh ("Noises in Another Room")
- Rosie Sturgess ("The Best of Mates")
- Reg Evans ("The Best of Mates")
- Margaret Stevens ("The Best of Mates")
- Peter Cummins ("The Best of Mates")
- Maurie Fields ("The Best of Mates")
- Eileen Chapman ("The Man Upon the Stair")
- Rod Mullinar ("The Man Upon the Stair")
- Sean Scully ("The Man Upon the Stair")
- George Whaley ("Temple in Ruins")
- John Paton ("Temple in Ruins")
- Trevor Hindmarsh ("Temple in Ruins")
- Olivia Hamnett ("Temple in Ruins")
- Gregory de Polnay ("Temple in Ruins")
- Valma Pratt ("Temple in Ruins")
- Garry Gray ("Next Time Will Be Better")
- Martin Foot ("Next Time Will Be Better")
- Lisa Peers ("Next Time Will Be Better")
- Penne Hackforth-Jones ("Next Time Will Be Better")
- Jennifer Claire ("Next Time Will Be Better")
- Graeme Blundell ("Adam and Inge")
- Lynette Curran ("Adam and Inge")
- Brian Hannan ("Adam and Inge")
- Wendy Hughes ("Adam and Inge")

== Episodes ==
No.	Title	Directed by	Written by	Original release date
1	"Claire and the Counter Revolutionary"	James Davern	Judith Colquhoun	29 March 1972
2	"One Room in a Mansion"	Douglas Sharp	David Boutland (in collaboration with Ron Smith)	5 April 1972
3	"And Mother Used to Sing"	James Davern	Ray Kolle	12 April 1972
4	"Birds of a Feather"	Keith Wilkes	Howard Griffiths	19 April 1972
5	"Noises in Another Room"	Christopher Muir	Jeff Underhill	26 April 1972
6	"The Best of Mates"	Oscar Whitbread	John Romeril	3 May 1972
7	"The Man Upon the Stair"	Douglas Sharp	Oriel Gray	10 May 1972
8	"Temple in Ruins"	David Zweck	Bill Reed	17 May 1972
9	"Next Time Will Be Better"	Christopher Muir	Sonia Borg	24 May 1972
10	"Adam and Inge"	Patrick Barton	Luis Bayonas	31 May 1972

== Reception ==
The Sydney Morning Herald's Valda Marshall was critical of the series, admitting that she did not want to "put the knock on something before it's barely off the ground", but she hoped the series would improve upon the first episode. Marshall disliked the plot, felt it was "made even worse by over acting and over writing", and did not think the characters "rang true". A few weeks later, Marshall had a change of heart, stating "I take it all back. A Time for Love, which got off to a disastrous start, has developed into a most promising series." She believed that if the idea behind the series was to develop "new talent" then that was what it was doing. She felt the sixth episode, "The Best of Mates", was "rough in spots" but that it had "a certain Steptoe quality of pathos to it", and was better than some shows brought to the screen by seasoned professionals, adding "Stick with it, John Romeril."

John Pinkney of The Age gave the series a mixed review, quipping "Dramatic standards of A Time For Love have fluctuated like a maiden's moods." However, he felt "Noises in Another Room" was one of the "distinctly superior efforts". He praised Underhill's story and called the episode "refreshingly and blackly imaginative". A fellow critic for the same newspaper was more negative and wrote "the ABC-TV's equivalent to Britain's Love Story is a dramatic series that has a lot of merit, one that needed to be made to maintain the thread of continuity creatively spinning upwards. But the series has not, I think, been enjoying the sort of audience of the British programme." They said the series was "derivative in concept and pace" and lacked the quality of writing and acting that Love Story had, adding that it had "shallow passages and what appears to be the inherent weakness of the homegrown product: unevenness of quality in the episodes." Like Pinkney, the critic praised "Noises in Another Room", particularly Christopher Muir's directing.
