= Caroline Agnes Gray =

- Born: Caroline Agnes Chisholm; 13 May 1848; London, United Kingdom
- Died: 15 April 1927 (aged 78); Inisfale Island on Lough Allen, County Leitrim
- Known for: owner of Freeman's Journal
- Parent(s): Caroline Chisholm and Archibald Chisholm
- Relatives: Edmund Dwyer-Gray (son)

Caroline or Carrie Agnes Gray (13 May 1848 – 15 April 1927) was an English hostess and owner of Freeman's Journal.

== Early life and family ==
Caroline Agnes Gray was born Caroline Agnes Chisholm on 13 May 1848 in London. She was the sixth child of the eight children of the philanthropist Caroline Chisholm (née Jones) and Archibald Chisholm (1798–1877), an officer in the army of the East India Company.

Gray met her husband Edmund Dwyer Gray in September 1868 when she witnessed him saving five people from a wrecked schooner during a storm in Killiney Bay, near Dún Laoghaire. She later met him, and the couple were married in 1869. They had four children, with three surviving to adulthood: Edmund, Mary (1871–1913), and Sylvia (1873–1951). Gray placed both of her daughters in convents after their education and the early death of their father, supposedly as she feared they would harm her chances of remarrying.

== Political life ==
Gray was a noted hostess during her husband's political career, in particular while he was Lord Mayor of Dublin. Following his death in 1888, she held over 40% of the shares in her husband's newspaper, the Freeman's Journal. While she was not involved in the day-to-day running of the company, she did exert influence over the newspaper. When Charles Stewart Parnell's party split, the paper sided with Parnell at Gray's consent. She was one of a number of prominent Catholic women in Dublin who continued to support Parnell. In 1891, she appeared with Parnell in public, leading to the Archbishop of Dublin describing her as "a rock of scandal."

It was only when the Freeman's Journal's circulation and revenue suffered after the establishment of an anti-Parnell newspaper, the National Press, that Gray's loyalty to Parnell wavered. Influenced by her son, Gray decided that the Freeman would abandon its relationship with Parnell. This decision was formalised at a special general meeting to the Freeman company on 21 September 1891, seeing the pro-Parnell board replaced with one that included Gray's son and Captain Maurice O'Conor. The Freeman and the National Press merged in March 1892, after which Gray was bought out of the company with her son and O'Conor stepping down from the board, thus ending the Gray family's 50 year relationship with the Freeman.

== Later life ==
Gray married Captain O'Conor in November 1891. A Captain, and later a Major, with the Connaught Rangers, he was a relative of Charles Owen O'Conor and George Moore. Gray was 12 years his senior, and the couple had no children. They lived on Inisfale Island on Lough Allen, County Leitrim. Gray lived the last 30 years of her life there, with failing eyesight and eventual blindness. She died there 15 April 1927. O'Conor died in a hotel in Dún Laoghaire on 3 January 1941, in poor circumstances.
