= The King Who Wouldn't =

- Original language: English
- Written by: Oriel Gray

The King Who Wouldn't is a 1952 Australian play by Oriel Gray.

It was highly commended in a Journalists’ Club competition for best new Australian play of 1956 (won by The Shifting Heart). The play was also known as Royal Tour.

Leslie Rees called it "well ahead of its time... a thinly veiled satire on contemporary royalty... At the time this comedy appeared unplayable, or at least it was unlikely any group would play it; it might have collected production honours had it been written a few years later in the age of permissiveness or down-with-the-Establishment."

The play was given a reading at Sydney's Independent Theatre in 1965.

The play also may have a connection with an early revue of Gray's, Marx of Time.

== Bibliography ==
- Gray, Oriel (1985). Exit Left: memoirs of a scarlet woman. Penguin.
