= Caroline Chisholm (play) =

1939 play by George Landen Dann

Caroline Chisolm
- Original language: English
- Written by: George Landen Dann
- Based on: the life of Caroline Chisolm

Premiere
- Date: 1939
- Place: Brisbane

Caroline Chisolm is an Australian stage play by George Landen Dann. It debuted in 1939 as The Second Moses then was revised under its new title.

It was his most successful historical play, a biographical work about a significant Australian colonial figure for her work in reforming the ways immigrant women were treated in Sydney. The play is noted as his most socially conventional plays and its success was no doubt due to the fact that the public found it edifying as well as entertaining. Based on the life of Caroline Chisholm, whose portrait appeared on the 1967 Australian Five Dollar Note., the play was first produced as A Second Moses by the Brisbane Repertory Society in 1939, since then it has probably been produced more than any other one of Dann's plays.

The play was performed at Sydney's Independent Theatre in 1946.

It was published in 1944.

It was adapted for ABC Radio in 1951.

== Synopsis and themes ==
The play documents Caroline Chisholm's work with young immigrant women arriving in Australia in the early colonial period. It covers her attempts to help the women find work and establish themselves, her inability to achieve the co-operation of George Gipps and spans the period 1840 to 1846 when Chisholm left Sydney, Australia for England where she worked for improvements in the conditions of English emigrants.

Dann wrote the play long before the general public had recognised Chisholm as a figure of national importance. It appeals to feelings of patriotism and philanthropy and explores the conflict between her social calling and her duty towards her husband.

== Radio adaptation ==
The play was adapted for radio in a 70 minute production that aired on the ABC in May 1951.

The ABC produced the play again in 1959.
