= Lawson (play) =

1943 Australian play by Oriel Gray

- Written by: Oriel Gray
- Based on: stories of Henry Lawson
- Characters: Henry Lawson
- Original language: English
- Genre: drama

Premiere
- Date premiered: 10 October 1943
- Place premiered: New Theatre, Sydney

Lawson is a 1943 Australian play by Oriel Gray. It was based on short stories by Henry Lawson.

The Sydney Morning Herald said "the play is a very entertaining and dramatic experiment with its well-selected material and craftsmanship."

Leslie Rees called it "well-liked... an adaptation of some of Henry Lawson’s human stories, ostensibly told by the billy-boiling Henry himself over the campfire. Little Arvie Aspinall and the country woman of “Past Carin’” came movingly to life and were in contrast to the humorous people of “Send Round the Hat”."

Pertinent said "The play, unconventional in presentation and lighting effects... is the best piece of Australian propaganda I have witnessed for many months. There is not much “business’’ in it, but the dialogue is forceful and worthy of the memory of Australia’s greatest writer."

The play was given a number of productions including ones in 1953, 1961 and 1967.
