= La Boite Theatre Company =

Australian theatre company based in Brisbane

La Boite Theatre
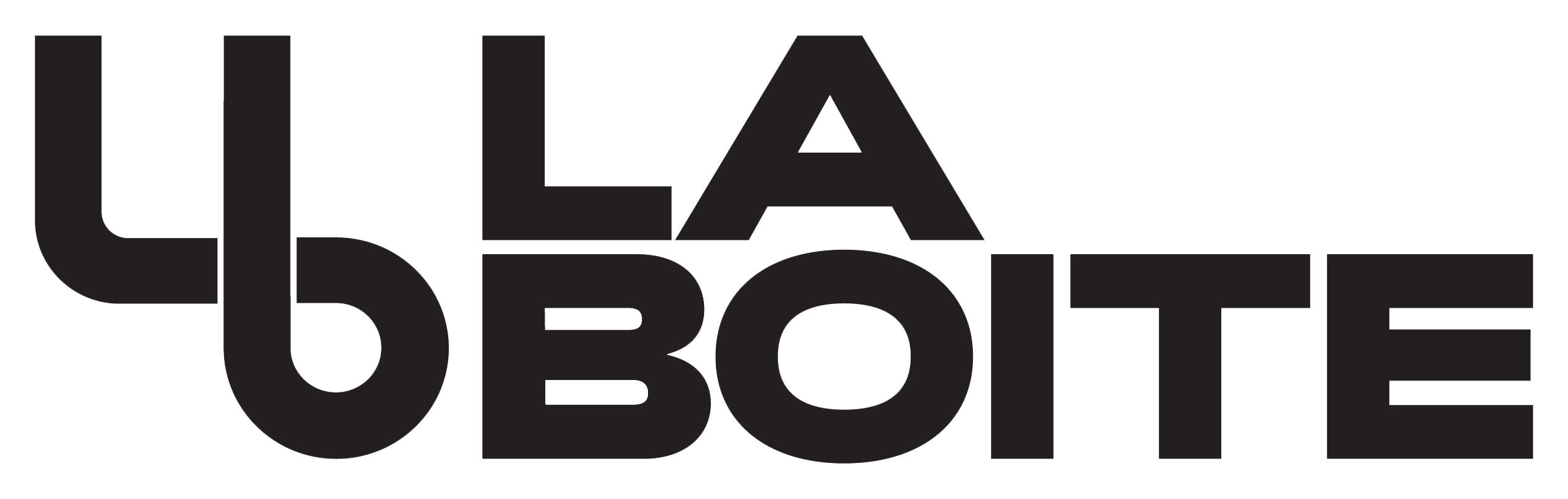
- Industry: Contemporary theatre
- Founded: as Brisbane Reportory Theatre Society; 1925
- Founder: Jeremiah Joseph Stable & Barbara Sisley
- Headquarters: Brisbane, Queensland, Australia
- Area served: Worldwide
- Key people: Courtney Stewart, artistic director; Roxane Eden, executive director (as of March 2023)
- Website: laboite.com.au

La Boite Theatre, founded as the Brisbane Repertory Theatre Society, is an Australian contemporary theatre company based in Brisbane, Queensland. La Boite was established in 1925 and is Australia's longest continuously running theatre company.

La Boite is based at Brisbane's Roundhouse Theatre, Australia's first purpose-built theatre-in-the-round, located in Kelvin Grove . The company moved into this venue in February 2004, leaving its former smaller theatre-in-the-round building, the La Boite Theatre Building, in Hale Street, Milton, where it had been since 1972.

The theatre's artistic directors have included Todd MacDonald (2015–2020) and David Berthold (2008–2014). As of March 2023 Courtney Stewart is artistic director.

== History ==
=== Establishment and early years (1925-1956) ===
La Boite was founded in 1925, under the direction of British-Australian teacher of speech and drama Barbara Sisley and English literature professor Jeremiah Joseph Stable. It was known as the Brisbane Repertory Theatre Society, and Rhoda Mary Felgate was a founding member and an early play director. The company is said to be one of the oldest continuously operating theatre companies in Australia, operating under Sisley's direction until her death in a road accident in 1945. Sisley had directed 57 productions for the company, including a number of Australian plays. After Sisley's death, the Brisbane Repertory Theatre Society survived from 1946 through to 1956 under Tom Stephens, Alex Foster, Cecil Carson and Gwen MacMinn.

=== Relocation to Hale Street and the first "La Boite" (1956-1969) ===
Babette Stephens succeeded the position of Council President in 1957, before accepting the first formal title of "Theatre Director" in 1959. A prominent professional Australian actor and director, Stephens helped to create the first permanent theatre for the company when she succeeded in getting the company to purchase four cottages in Sexton Street and Hale Street in Petrie Terrace. The suggestion was made to convert one of the cottages into a "theatre-in-the-round" theatre space similar to Hayes Gordon's Ensemble Theatre in Sydney. In the lead-up to the launch of the theatre's new season in Hale Street in 1967, Brisbane Repertory Theatre adopted the new name "La Boite", The French translation of "the box". La Boite's intimate, 70-seat space attracted a new audiences, as well as a new directors and actors, including Jane Atkins, Eileen Beatson, Ian Thomson, Barry Otto, John Stanton and Muriel Watson. The repertoire of the company changed to a more radical, non-mainstream one. Australian plays became a regular feature of the season.

=== Second relocation and company expansion (1969-2000) ===
Jennifer Blocksidge became Honorary Director in 1969, and remained in the role until 1975. In 1972, La Boite's second in-the-round performance space was established, with the purpose-built, 200-seat theatre-in-the round, award-winning Blair Wilson designing the new La Boite Theatre Building (now heritage-listed). Blocksidge established her eventual aim to make La Boite a professional theatre company through the establishment in 1975 of the first professional 'theatre-in-education' team in Queensland, the Early Childhood Drama Project (ECDP), and the 1976 appointment of La Boite's first salaried artistic director, Rick Billinghurst. Billinghurst embarked on a program of Australian and overseas works.

Malcolm Blaylock was appointed artistic director in 1980, when La Boite became a "pro-am" theatre company. The early 1980s was a buoyant time for La Boite and for the pro-am or professional community theatre companies funded by the Australia Council. Blaylock programmed innovative, risky, and politically challenging Australian and non-Australian plays. The appointment in mid-1982 of Andrew Ross as artistic director brought La Boite into more professional main-house repertoire. By 1983, the company had lost both state and federal funding. The following years were considered financially trying for La Boite, but a huge effort by the Council and "resident directors" Mike Bridges and Mary Hickson kept the company and theatre afloat. The 1986 appointment of Jim Vilé as both artistic director and CEO was a time of a more "open door" programming at La Boite where "every day and evening of every month of the Theatre's year was accounted for with a production of some kind…"

Patrick Mitchell took over from Vilé as artistic director in 1990. By 1991, the stress of running such a vibrant pro-am theatre company proved too much and David Bell took over as artistic director later in that year. Bell's innovative cross-arts approach to theatre saw the beginning of La Boite as a professional company and produced performances which blended circus, opera and modern dance with theatre. Although the innovative fusion of Bell's work gained critical and artistic success, La Boite once again was financially floundering. However, the appointment in 1993 of Sue Rider as artistic director saw a period of unparalleled growth, bolstered the performance of new Australian plays and Rider's commitment to Queensland artists.

=== Third relocation and present-day (2000 – present) ===
Sean Mee had been one of Brisbane's leading actors for many years and he had started his career at La Boite with the Early Childhood Drama Project in the 1980s. He took the company in new artistic directions. The company left the theatre it owned and moved to the new La Boite Theatre – the Roundhouse Theatre, a larger replica of the second La Boite Theatre. It was built in the Creative Industries Precinct of Queensland University of Technology's Kelvin Grove Campus. Mee's Artistic Directorship saw the company both artistically and financially reap the benefits of embracing primarily programming new Queensland works commissioned through La Boite. In 2008, Mee relinquished his position of artistic director. Despite the initial trials with the company, including the Australia Council cutting funding to the company, David Berthold took up the position of artistic director, and under his leadership the company broadened its scope to include international works in its programming while retaining the company's over-85-year commitment to fostering Queensland and Australian theatre. Berthold's efforts with the company were heralded as having "completely repositioned a Brisbane institution [La Boite]", and garnered several prominent awards, including numerous winnings of the prestigious Matilda Awards. Berthold's term ended in 2014.

== Personnel ==
As of March 2023 Courtney Stewart is artistic director, and Roxane Eden is executive director.

Stewart, whose mother is Chinese Australian, graduated in 2008 with a degree in drama from Queensland University of Technology (QUT). She worked in children's theatre in Brisbane, including playing Tashi in Imaginary Theatre's adaptation of Anna Fienberg's Tashi books, aged just 19, as well as television, notably Jay's Jungle from 2016 to 2018. Living in Sydney since 2014, she went on to work as an actor, dramaturg, and theatre director, including Michelle Law. She joined the board of Contemporary Asian Australian Performance (CAAP) in 2019, becoming artistic associate in 2022.

== Leaders and artistic directors ==
- Barbara Sisley (1925–1945)
- Tom Stephens
- Alex Foster
- Cecil Carson
- Gwen MacMinn
- Babette Stephens (1946–1968)
- Jennifer Blocksidge (1969–1975)
- Rick Billinghurst (1976–1980)
- Malcolm Blaylock (1980–1986)
- Jim Vilé (1986–1990)
- Patrick Mitchell (1990–1991)
- David Bell (1991–1993)
- Sue Rider (1993–2000)
- Sean Mee (2000–2008)
- David Berthold (2008–2014)
- Chris Kohn (2014)
- Todd McDonald (2015–2022)
- Courtney Stewart (2022–present)

== Selected productions ==
=== 2009 season ===
- The White Earth based on the novel of the same name by Andrew McGahan (23 Feb-21 March)
- Blue Love devised and choreographed by Shaun Parker (28 April-9 May)
- Statespeare by Nelle Lee (19–29 May)
- Oodgeroo by Sam Watson (30 June-11 July)
- The Pineapple Queen by Norman Price (28 July-8 August)
- The Kursk by Sasha Janowicz (1–12 September)

=== 2010 season ===
- The Gruffalo based on the picture-book of the same name by Julia Donaldson (11–29 January)
- Hamlet by William Shakespeare (6 Feb-14 March)
- Stockholm by Bryony Lavery (28 April-22 May)
- The Chairs by Eugène Ionesco (5 June-4 July)
- I Love You, Bro by Adam J A Cass (17 July-8 August)
- Engine by Janis Balodis (25 August-12 Sept)
- Gwen in Purgatory by Tommy Murphy (27 Sept-24 Oct)

La Boite Indie

- Michelle Miall presents Colder by Lachlan Philpott (22 Jun-10 Jul)
- Dead Puppet Society presents The Harbinger by David Morton and Matthew Ryan (13–31 July)
- Umber Productions presents Water Wars by Elaine Acworth (3–21 Aug)
- The Danger Ensemble presents The Hamlet Apocalypse (24 Aug-11 Sept)

=== 2011 season ===
- The Gruffalo's Child based on the picture-book of the same name by Julia Donaldson (5–23 January)
- Julius Caesar by William Shakespeare (12 February-20 March)
- boy girl wall by The Escapists (30 March-17 April)
- Statespeare by Nellie Lee (28 April-6 May)
- Edward Gant's Amazing Feats of Loneliness by Anthony Neilson (20 May-12 June)
- Ruben Guthrie by Brendan Cowell (8 October-13 November)

=== 2015 season ===
- A Midsummer Night's Dream by William Shakespeare
- Samson starring Ashleigh Cummings
- Medea by Euripides in a new adaptation starring Christen O'Leary
- Prize Fighter, a collaboration between La Boite Theatre and Brisbane Festival 2015
