= Western Limit =

- Original language: English
- Written by: Oriel Gray
- Genre: drama

Premiere
- Date: February 1946
- Place: New Theatre, Sydney

Western Limit is a 1946 Australian play by Oriel Gray. It was performed a number of times throughout Australia in the 1940s.

Leslie Rees said "The play was an overstocked paddock, sprawling and hinting at too many thorny questions, but never dull like its title. The author had a witty and pointed as well as savage line in dialogue,... The characters were recognizably real, even if the story-line was not strong."

The Sydney Morning Herald said "the play is not a good one and was made no better by the performance."

== Premise ==
The struggles of a farming family.
