= Jeremiah Joseph Stable =

Australian professor (1883–1953)

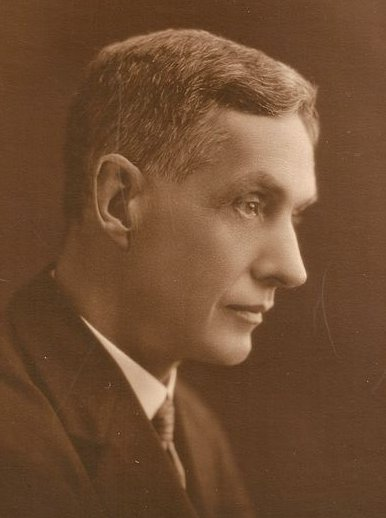

Jeremiah Joseph Stable (14 May 1883–24 December 1953) was an Australian academic, who was the first professor of English at the University of Queensland in Brisbane, Queensland, Australia.

== Early life ==
Jeremiah Joseph Stable was born on 14 May 1883 in Willaston, the son of Benjamin Stable and his wife Mary Ann (née O'Connell). His parents moved to Europe when he was four years old and he was educated in Switzerland until the age of 18. In 1902 he entered Cambridge University where he obtained an honours degree in medieval and modern languages, specialising in English literature. Between 1905 and 1908, he taught at the Commercial University of Cologne in Germany, while studying English and German philosophy at the Bonn University.

In 1912, Stable was appointed as a lecturer in modern languages at the University of Queensland.

In 1914 Stable undertook an extensive tour of northern Queensland with T.E. Jones, the newly appointed University press officer.

== Military service ==
During World War I, Stable joined the Australian Army and became an official censor. In 1917, a national referendum was held to allow conscription into military service; the Australian Prime Minister Billy Hughes was strongly in favour of conscription. On 22 November 1917, the Queensland Premier T. J. Ryan made a strong speech in the Queensland Parliament against conscription. In the normal course of events, this speech would be reported in Hansard. However, on 27 November 1917, Stable received a hand-written message from Billy Hughes ordering him, as censor, to take possession of all printed copies of Hansard under the censorship provisions of the War Precautions Act. Stable went to the Queensland Government Printing Office, but was prevented from entering by the Queensland Police (who were apparently ordered to prevent his access by Premier Ryan). Stable then went to the Victoria Barracks where he obtained a troop of Australian soldiers, and returned with them to the printing office. On this occasion, the police allowed him to enter. Then with the assistance of the Queensland Government Printer, all but 3 copies of the Hansard were destroyed. Only the copy retained by Stable himself is known to have survived, having been found amongst his garden tools after Stable and his wife had died; it is held by the State Library of Queensland and is considered a treasure of the John Oxley Library collection. Another copy had been donated to the National Library of Australia but it has since vanished. The fate of the third copy is unknown.

== Academic career ==
After the war, Stable resumed his academic career at the University of Queensland. On 15 February 1923 the university appointed him as the McCaughey Professor of Modern Languages and Literature. He served as Dean of the Faculty of Arts for seven years and Dean of Commerce for six years.

The University of Queensland was among the first to include the study of Australian literature as part of its set courses as early as 1923, due in large part to the work of Stable and Frederick Walter Robinson.

In 1931 Stable, along with Professor Henry Alcock and Professor Thomas Parnell, joined the broadcasting sub-committee which broadcast 'lecturettes' for the Australian Broadcasting Commission.

== Other positions ==
- President of the University of Queensland Dramatic Society, 1912
- Stable co-founded the Brisbane Repertory Theatre Society group with Barbara Sisley in 1925–26. and served as its President from 1926 to 1945.
- President of the Queensland Authors and Artists Association 1921–1931
- President of the English and Modern Languages Association of Queensland for 25 years
- Vice President of the Brisbane Shakespeare Society
- Life member of the Modern Humanities Research Association of England
- Foundation member of the Historical Society of Queensland
- President of the Trustees of the Queensland Museum 1946–1948

== Later life ==
Stable retired in December 1952. He died in Brisbane on 24 December 1953. His funeral was held at St Mary's Anglican Church at Kangaroo Point after which he was cremated at Mount Thompson crematorium.

== Personal life ==
Stable married fellow Australian, Irene Bingham Sheridan in 1908. They had three sons.

== Legacy ==
Stable was honoured with a stone grotesque in the Great Court of the university. An open-air theatre was established in his name on the grounds of the university in 1923 for third year Shakespearean students to use. This open air theatre was officially named for him and marked with a plaque, with Dame Sybil Thorndike attending this event in 1954.
