= Oriel Gray =

Australian playwright and screenwriter (1920–2003)

- Born: Oriel Holland Bennett; 26 March 1920; Sydney, New South Wales, Australia
- Died: 30 June 2003 (aged 83); Heidelberg West, Victoria, Australia
- Occupations: Playwright; screenwriter; dramatist
- Partner: John Hepworth
- Writing career
- Genres: Social and political issues

Oriel Holland Bennett (26 March 1920 – 30 June 2003) known by pen name Oriel Gray, was an Australian dramatist, playwright and screenwriter who wrote from the 1940s to 1990s. The major themes of her work were gender equality and "social and political issues such as the environment, Aborigines, assimilation and bush life".

== Early life ==
Gray was born Oriel Holland Bennett in Sydney, New South Wales. Her father and grandfather owned a newspaper in Young, New South Wales. With the death of her mother in 1926, her older sister Grayce became the guiding female presence of her formative years. Gray came from a politically active family, her father briefly held the seat of Werriwa for the Australian Labor Party. Gray was a member of the Communist Party of Australia from 1942 to 1950. She remained active in the peace movement until the dismissal of the Whitlam government in 1975.

== Personal life ==
She married John Gray in 1940, an actor whom she met while at the Sydney New Theatre and they had a son, Stephen. By 1947 her marriage had broken down and she moved on to a long-term relationship with writer John Hepworth, with whom she had two more sons, Peter and Nicholas. Gray died from a heart attack, aged 83 in Heidelberg West, on 30 June 2003.

== Career ==
From 1937 to 1949, Gray wrote and acted for the Sydney New Theatre which had the reputation of being left wing and avant-garde, being modelled on the new radical and political theatre movement blossoming in the United States. In 1942, Gray was appointed as the first paid Australian playwright-in-residence. She was commissioned to write a weekly radio segment for the New Theatre on 2KY and her first stage play, based on the short stories of Henry Lawson, was performed at New Theatre in 1943.

In reviewing plays, L. L. Woolacott, critic and editor of the Sydney Triad magazine, described Gray as "one of the most significant and talented Australian playwrights whose work has so far been produced here".

Over her stage-writing career, she wrote two political revues, six one act and eight full length stage plays, plus several plays for young adults.

The 1955 award by the Playwrights' Advisory Board for best play was given jointly to Gray's play The Torrents and to Ray Lawler's play Summer of the Seventeenth Doll. This has been called "one of the great “compare and contrast” moments in the history of female Australian playwriting."

Gray's play, with its themes of "feminism and the saving of the environment", did not have popular appeal in a very conservative era with only one amateur performance recorded (New Theatre, Adelaide 1957). It was not published until 1988 and did not have a professional production until 1996 by the State Theatre Company of South Australia at the Adelaide Festival of Arts. In 2019 The Torrents was produced jointly by the Sydney Theatre Company and Black Swan State Theatre Company under Clare Watson's direction, starring Celia Pacquola in the leading role. In the eighties the play was turned into a light-hearted musical, called A Bit O' Petticoat (1982), with music composed by Peter Pinne.

Gray's play Burst of Summer won the 1959 J. C. Williamson Theatre Guild Competition. The play explores the racial tensions that erupt in a small town when a young Aboriginal girl gains brief notability as a film actress. The plot is not based on real events, rather being inspired by the release of Charles Chauvel's film Jedda which made known the Aboriginal actors Ngarla Kunoth and Robert Tudawali. Tudawali played the role of Don in the television version of the play for ABC TV (1961). Despite a poor critical reception at the time, this production is noted as a cultural landmark, having three First Nations' performers in major roles.

== Major stage plays ==
- Lawson (1943) Published Yackandanda Playscripts
- Western Limit (1946)
- My Life is my Affair (1947)
- Hewers of Coal (1947)
- Had We But World Enough (1950) Published Playlab New Vintage
- Sky without Birds (1952) Published Currency Press
- The King Who Wouldn't (1953)
- The Torrents (1954) Published Currency Press
- Drive a Hard Bargain (1957) Published Rigby
- Burst of Summer (1958) Published Currency Press

== Screen writing ==
Gray adapted Sheridan's The Rivals as a television play for ABC-TV and her stage plays Burst of Summer and The Torrents. She wrote six original television plays for ABC-TV, also working as a team member on the television serial Bellbird for nearly a decade. In 1970 she co-wrote the feature film script for Beyond Reason, directed by Giorgio Mangiamele.

Her original screen writing includes:

- Antarctic Four (1966)
- The Brass Guitar (1967)
- Beyond Reason (1970) - co-writer with Robert Garlick
- The Man Upon the Stair (1972) - episode of A Time for Love
- The Dancing Star (1972)
- Frank and Francesca (1973)
- Rush (1974) - episode
- We Should Have Had a Uniform (1975) - episode of The Quality of Mercy

== Radio plays ==
Beginning with the serialised version of her play Western Limit. Gray wrote radio adaptations of several of her major stage plays, many educational radio dramas for the Victorian Education Department and original plays for ABC Radio including:

- Philip of Australia (1944)
- The Ghosts in My Family (1982)
- The Man Who Wanted to Murder Sherlock Holmes (1987)

== Other writing ==
In 1985, her memoir Exit Left was published, detailing her life in New Theatre, personal relationships and growing unease with the leadership direction of the Australian Communist Party. It was republished in 2020.

Gray published one novel, The Animal Shop (1990).

Her last work for the stage, Joan and The Errant Soul, A Moment in the Permanent War, was written for and produced by Sydney's Belmore Theatre in 1997.
