= Fountains Beyond =

1942 play by George Landen Dann

- Original language: English
- Written by: George Landen Dann
- Characters: 7
- Subject: Aboriginals
- Genre: drama

Premiere
- Date: January 28, 1942
- Place: New Theatre, Sydney

Fountains Beyond is a 1942 Australian stage play by George Landen Dann. It is his best known work.

It was a rare play at the time to address the issues of Aboriginal Australians. In 1942 Leslie Rees called it Dann's "best work so far."

The play was adapted for radio in 1942, 1954 and 1957.

It was published in book form in 1944.

The play was revived in 2000.

== Premise ==
English travel writer Miss Gertrude Harnett has arrives in the small Queensland town of Kooreelba. Mayoral candidate Mr Watson, organises an Aboriginal corroboree in her honour. All money raised is to go towards a new children’s playground to be built in the adjacent Aboriginal settlement. The development is part of the politician's plan to expand the town and further disposes the traditional land owners.

Vic Filmer, a spokesperson of the Aboriginal community, leads the battle against the development. In doing so he accidentally shoots his wife.

== Reception ==
Reviewing the 1942 stage production Wireless Weekly said "Truly Australian in context, it [the play] has a strong emotional impact and handles an important problem with insight and sound dramatic form. Dialogue is concise and characterisation sure. "

Reviewing the 1943 ABC radio version The Bulletin argued:

Had the abos. united and fought against the white, they would have made material for drama... But the situation of the abos. has always been exactly that defined by Matthew Arnold as impossible for art: merely “pitiable,” without the heroic conflict, physical or mental, that makes the stuff of tragedy. Dann might have been able to make a personal tragedy— the failure of ambition —out of his half-caste who strives for the betterment of the abos.; but the emphasis, instead of being personal, was on the general reaction of the abos. to their being uprooted from a cherished camp; there was no general struggle, only pathos and pity, and so nothing to lift the play from pro-paganda to tragedy.

== Cast of 1954 Radio Production ==
- Richard Davies as Vic Filmer
- Coralie Neville as Peggy
- Barrie Cookson as Wally
- Kenneth Warren as Henry
- Guy Doleman as Mr. Watson
- Alma Butterfield as Miss Matthews
- Madge Ryan as Miss Harnett

== Cast of 1957 Radio Production ==
- Nigel Lovell as Vic Filmer
- Betty Lucas as Peggy Filmer
- Queenie Ashtor as Miss Harnett
- Don Pascoe as Wally
- John Tate as Henry
- Winifred Greer as Miss Matthews
- Ron Whelan as Mr. Watson
