= Ethel Nhill Victoria Stonehouse =

Australian poet and novelist (1883–1964)

- Born: 1 August 1883; Nhill, Victoria, Australia
- Died: 1 May 1964 (aged 80); Macleod, Victoria, Australia
- Occupations: novelist; poet; short story writer
- Writing career
- Pen name: Harlingham Quinn; Lindsay Russell; Patricia Lindsay Russell

Ethel Nhill Victoria Stonehouse (1 August 1883 – 1 May 1964) was an Australian writer. She wrote under a number of pseudonyms, including Lindsay Russell and Harlingham Quinn.

== Life ==
Stonehouse was born on 1 August 1883 at Nhill in Victoria. She was the fourth child of Jane (née Hardingham) and blacksmith Robert Stonehouse. She attended Charlton State School until she was 14.

Stonehouse's early works were poems and short stories which were published in Australia in The Bulletin, in England in The Spectator and in America in Munsey's Magazine and Smart Set Magazine.

In December 1910 she brought an action for breach of promise of marriage against Michael Francis Quinn, a Roman Catholic priest, seeking £1,000 damages. The matter was dropped in late January 1911.

In 1912, her first book, Smouldering Fires, was published using the pseudonym, Lindsay Russell. Set in the Mallee region of Victoria, the "characters are thinly disguised" and the plot appears to follow the author's personal experience when a priest takes advantage of her, leading to her disgrace. The book was seen as a "severe indictment of celibacy".

In 1912, following the successful sale of nearly 5,000 copies of Smouldering Fires and with a number of other books planned, Stonehouse left Melbourne on the Scharnhorst to visit Italy and other parts of Europe, seeking to recover her health. Smouldering Fires went on to sell 100,000 copies in Australia in eight editions. It and her second book, Love Letters of a Priest, were subject to a papal boycott whereby booksellers were asked to refrain from stocking them. Advocate journalist, Marion Knowles was scathing in her initial review, calling it a "most virulent attack on the Catholic Church" and a "vicious attempt to blacken the character of the priesthood". Later she noted that it had sold 10,000 copies by November 2012.

Stonehouse married medical practitioner John McNaught Scott in Stonehouse, Lanarkshire, Scotland on 23 September 1914. He had treated her for tuberculosis before their marriage.

She spent much of World War I in Ireland, where she continued writing novels. Her final novel, Earthware, was published in 1918. About an unhappy marriage, it appeared to be based on her own experience.

After the War, the couple moved to Australia and lived at Mortlake in Victoria, where her husband worked as a doctor and served as shire president. Her life was, however, stifled in this "intellectually repressed rural town".

== Later life and death ==
Following her husband's death in 1942, Stonehouse became reclusive. In 1949 she was admitted, suffering from "mental enfeeblement", to Mont Park Asylum in the Melbourne suburb of Maclean.

Stonehouse died on 1 May 1964 at Mont Park Asylum and was buried at in the Roman Catholic section of Footscray General Cemetery.

== Selected works ==
- Russell, Lindsay (1912), Smouldering fires, Fraser & Jenkinson
- Russell, Patricia Lindsay (1912), Love letters of a priest, Australasian Authors' Agency
- Quinn, Harlingham (1913), Sands o' the desert, Specialty Press
- Russell, Lindsay (1913), Souls in pawn, Ward, Lock & Co., Limited
- Russell, Lindsay (1913), Kathleen Mavourneen : an Australian tale, The Speciality Press Pty. Ltd
- Russell, Lindsay (1914), The years of forgetting, Ward, Lock & Co., Limited
- Quinn, E. Hardingham (1916), That woman from Java, London: Hurst and Blackett, Ltd
- Russell, Lindsay (1918), Earthware, London: Cassell
- Russell, Lindsay (1923), The caravan of dreams : and other verses of the Grampians road, The Express Office
