= George Landen Dann =

Australian writer

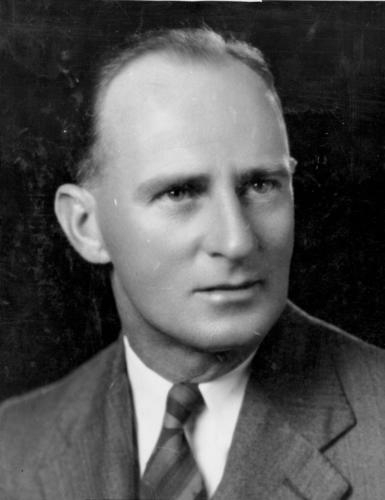
- Born: 1 January 1904; Sandgate, Queensland, Australia
- Died: 6 June 1977 (aged 76)
- Citizenship: Australia
- Occupations: Playwright, drafstman
- Years active: 1931–1975
- Notable work: Fountains Beyond; In Beauty It Is Finished; Caroline Chisholm
- Awards: View Here

George Landen Dann (1 January 1904 – 6 June 1977) was an Australian playwright, writer, and draftsman. He is best known for a number of award-winning and critically acclaimed plays such as In Beauty It Is Finished, Fountains Beyond, Caroline Chisholm and The Orange Grove. Dann wrote dozens of published and unpublished plays over the course of his lifetime. Originally writing plays for the amateur dramatic society at Sandgate, Queensland, Dann was a particularly shy and reclusive person, and even though he wrote part-time, his more popular plays were widely performed by amateur theatre companies around Australia. George Landen Dann's writing has been appreciated for its social realism, with a number of his plays delving into issues involving Indigenous Australians and their central characters reflecting individuals that Dann had met during his time in outback Australia.

The George Landen Dann Award was established in 1992. It was awarded to promising young Australian playwrights until 2007.

== Biography ==
=== Early life ===
Born in Sandgate, Queensland on 1 January 1904, George Landen Dann was the son of George William Dann and Mildred Challis Dann (née Pearman). He had an older sister, Isabel Challis (born 23 December 1901) and two younger sisters, Dorothy Rose (born 1905), and Mildred Matilda (born 1908). Mildred died the same year she was born.

Dann was educated at Brisbane Grammar School, and in 1920 at the age of 16 he entered the survey office of the Queensland Lands Department where he undertook training as a draftsman. It is believed that it was at the time he was undergoing his draftsman training that he began writing plays. Dann indicated in a number of letters and articles that he originally aspired to be a pastor in the Anglican Church so that he could make a difference and improve the lives of the Indigenous Australian people. This early ambition was reflected in the moral seriousness of his plays which, in some cases, addressed the discrimination and disadvantage of Aboriginal people in Australia. In 1924 he joined the Brisbane City Council as a draftsman in the water supply department.

=== Theatrical beginnings ===
For the first few years of his theatrical career, Dann wrote and had performed plays in and around the Sandgate area. In 1924 he performed and wrote a play for the Sandgate Queen Carnival Musical and Dramatic Concert at Town Hall. He also performed in a farcical comedy sketch called A Pair of Lunatics with Miss Gwen Taylor, and then in a comedy play Odds (which is credited to him) with his sister Isobel Dann in the cast. More significant recognition would not come until 1931 when Dann wrote In Beauty It Is Finished, first staged on 16 July at His Majesty's Theatre and directed by Barbara Sisley. Proving to be his most well-known play, In Beauty It Is Finished won the top award in the Brisbane Repertory Theatre Society's national competition against 94 other entries. Despite the acclaim the play received, there was significant media outrage surrounding its theme of addressing race relations in Australia, including the play's depiction of a relationship between a white woman and a 'half-caste' Aboriginal man. The controversy, however, meant the play was well attended, and most found the play was not as unseemly as they had been led to believe.

In 1932, during a trip to Hamilton Island, Dann experienced a personal life crisis. At this time he wrote letters to a friend referred to as 'Jim H' and conveyed his dissatisfaction with his life, knowing full well that he will never achieve the fame or recognition he deserved. In the end, he expresses his realization that his name or his works might never be famous and he is ready to accept life as an ordinary citizen. That same year he entered Oh! The Brave Music for the Brisbane Repertory Theatre Society's play competition, but it was not selected. His sister Isobel Dann died in 1932, age 30.

For the next few years, Dann would continue to write a number of award-winning plays. In 1933 he won first prize at the Queensland Eisteddfod for The Day of Roses, and his 1937 play No Incense Rising won awards from the Dramatist's Club of Australia, the Sydney Independent Theatre and Australian Dramatists Club, as well as being placed on the Playwright's Advisory Board's list of recommended Australian plays. It is believed that Dann then travelled to Sydney to conduct research for his next play Caroline Chrisholm, which was produced in 1939, first staged in 1940 and eventually published in 1943. It proved to be one of his most popular works.

Dann returned to writing on the issue of race relations with his play Fountains Beyond, arguably his most critically acclaimed play, staged and broadcast in 1942. It was awarded second place next to Douglas Stewart's Ned Kelly in the Australian Broadcasting Commission's radio-drama competition. It was performed throughout Australia, and in London and Wales in 1950. Dann enlisted in the Australian military in April 1942 where he was part of the Mobile Concert Party Unit, which was involved in entertaining men in hospitals and convalescent units. He later would say that he enlisted as a means to 'escape', not out of patriotism. He was discharged from the armed forces in 1945.

=== Later life ===
After the war, Dann returned his focus to writing plays and radio plays. Ha Ha Among the Trumpets shared in the Playwright's Advisory Board Competition prize in 1946, though was rejected for staging due to the play's length and difficulty with the large cast. Dann's father George William Dann died in 1948, whereupon Dann sold the family home in Sandgate and built his new house in Coolum, Queensland on the Sunshine Coast, Queensland. He would later retire from his Council position as a draftsman in 1954, residing in Coolum Beach, Queensland for the rest of his life.

Following his retirement from the Brisbane City Council, Dann continued to write material for the stage, including How Far Returning (1955), Resurrection at Matthew Town (1958), Rings Out Wild Bells (1959), and Rainbows Die at Sunset (1975). This last work was based on a riot at the town of Nambucca Heads, New South Wales in New South Wales in 1958 when white residents refused sales of houses to Aboriginal Australians. His most popular work after his retirement was The Orange Grove, a radio play whose main female character 'Carrie' was based on a real woman who lived in the Shire of Maroochy region of the Sunshine Coast, Queensland. Later, Dann also submitted The Fortress, a stage adaptation of The Orange Grove.

He wrote the TV play Vacancy in Vaughn Street as "John Crane".

In 1976, University of Queensland Arts student Deborah Rasmussen wrote her Honours Thesis on George Landen Dann and his works. Dann assisted her.

George Landen Dann died at a friend's place at the nearby town of Eumundi, Queensland on 6 June 1977 after falling ill while prospecting. He was cremated with Anglican rites and his ashes were scattered off the cliffs of Coolum.

== Works for Theatre ==
Year	Works
1924	Odds
1925	Family Failings
1931	In Beauty It Is Finished
1932	OH! The Brave Music!
1932	The Giant
1934	Monday Morning
1934	A Foreground for Fanny
1934	The Days of Roses
1937	No Incense Rising
1939	Caroline Chisholm
1940	Funerals For Field Mice
1941	The Green Trees
1942	Fountains Beyond
1945	Ha! Ha! Among The Trumpets
1946	How Far Returning
1958	The Orange Grove
1958	Resurrection of Matthewton
1958	Ring Out Wild Bells
1975	Rainbows Die at Sunset

== Awards and recognition ==
George Landen Dann was considered Queensland's first significant playwright, however, it wasn't until 1931 that he won his first competition for his controversial play In Beauty it is Finished. This play was the first to win the Brisbane Repertory Theatre Society's award for an Australian Play, a competition he also won the following year. Dann won a number of local competitions, including the Queensland Eisteddfod, before moving on to win, or place, in national and international competitions. His first national win was for his play No Incense Rising which won the Nationwide Dramatists' Club of Australia Competition. His first international win was then for his second controversial play, Fountain Beyond, which won an Eisteddfod in Wales. Dann then continued to win and place in competitions until two years before his death. In 1975 Dann won second place at the Newcastle Playwright competition for his last work, Rainbows die at Sunset.

Year	Play	Award	Competition
1931	In Beauty it Is Finished	Won	Brisbane Repertory Theatre Society Australian Play Award
1932	Oh! The Brave Music	Won	Brisbane Repertory Theatre Society Australian Play Award
1934	The Days of Roses	Won	Brisbane Eisteddford
1934	Monday Morning	Favourable mention	Laura Boyne Luffman Memorial Fund award
1938	No Incense Rising	Won	Dramatists' Club of Australia competition
1938	No Incense Rising	Won	Independent Theatre of Sydney's Playwright Competition
1938	A Foreground for Fanny	Won	ABC Play Competition
1940	Funerals for Field Mice	3rd	ABC's Radio Play Competition
1942	Fountains Beyond	2nd	The commission's Bonus Play Competition
1946	Ha Ha! Amongst the Trumpets	Won	Australian Playwright Advisory Board competition
1950	Fountains Beyond	Won	Wales Eisteddford
1958	Resurrection at Matthew Town	Won	General Motors Play Competition
1975	Rainbows Die at Sunset	2nd	Newcastle Playwriting Competition

== The George Landen Dann Award ==
The George Landen Dann award was named in honor of Queensland's first significant playwright. The Queensland Theatre Company, in collaboration with The Courier-Mail, first presented the award in 1992. The award was originally sponsored for only three years by the Courier Mail, but was continued over a number of subsequent years. The award was presented to a young playwright, between the ages of 19–25, with the winner receiving $5,000. The winning play was usually workshopped and presented to audiences by the Queensland Theatre Company.

In 1994 the award underwent its first review, after The Courier-Mail confirmed its continued support. The Queensland Theatre Company decided the award would be presented biannually rather than annually, as it had previously been. Advertisements were then released calling for submissions of work that were published in late 1994, with a closing date of 24 March 1995. A reading of the winning play was then presented in 1996, as tradition by the Queensland Theatre Company. In 1996 there was once again no winner, as the award underwent its second review, of which The Courier-Mail had significant involvement, due its role as the award's major sponsor. The review looked at the past achievements of the award, and the future possibilities and directions. The award was then reintroduced in 1997, and was presented annually until its termination in 2006.

Although handed out rather consistently since its inauguration in 1992, the final George Landen Dann award was last presented in 2006, there have been no references made by the Queensland Theatre Company's Annual report of there being any further recipients. The award had been overshadowed by the Queensland Premier's Drama Award – Theatre and Public Life for playwrights. Queensland Premier Peter Beattie's first announcement of the new award in 2001, one year prior to it being first awarded, lead to editorials in The Courier-Mail that noted, 'the George Landen Dann award for new playwrights, too, has been eclipsed by a similar prize in the Premier's awards, and is in danger of disappearing'.

The George Landen Dann award was often referred to as the 19-25-age category, of the Queensland Young Playwright's Award, an award that also had a high school age category of 14–15 years of age and 16–18 years of age. In 2007, this award was revamped and replaced with a Young Playwrights Program, a program that the Queensland Theatre Company designed in order to give young and emerging playwrights the opportunity to "develop short plays over an extended period with assistance from a professional dramaturge and Company staff". That year four writers were selected in the program and the process resulted in a public reading of each play by a cast of professional Company artists.

=== Winners of the George Landen Dann Award ===
- 1992: The Surgical Table, by Daynan Brazil
- 1993: Composing Venus, by Elaine Ackworth
- 1994: No winner
- 1995: Asylum, by David McCartney
- 1996: No winner
- 1997: Joint winners: Georgia, by Jill Shearer, and Rio Saki and Other Falling Debris, by Shaun Charles.
- 1998: The Postcard, by Angela Betzien
- 1999: The Dance of Jeremiah, by Matthew Ryan
- 2000: Great Leaders of the Twentieth Century, by Paul Galloway
- 2001: No winner
- 2002: Glimpses From the Water's Edge, by Catherine To
- 2003: Afloat and Drifting, Beth King
- 2004: I Witness, by Aedan Whyatt
- 2005: Magda's Fascination with Wax Cats, by Maxine Mellor
- 2006: The Rainbow Dark, by Victoria Carless
