= The Torrents =

Play by Oriel Gray

- Original language: English
- Written by: Oriel Gray
- Genre: comedy

Premiere
- Date: 1957

The Torrents is a 1955 Australian play by Oriel Gray, set in the late 19th century, about the arrival of a female journalist in an all-male newspaper office, and an attempt to develop irrigation-based agriculture in a former gold mining town.

In 1955 it was voted best play that year by the Playwrights' Advisory Board, alongside Ray Lawler's Summer of the Seventeenth Doll, winning a prize of £100 for its author. This has been called "one of the great “compare and contrast” moments in the history of female Australian playwriting."

== Theme ==
The play is set in the second half of the 19th century, in the newspaper office of a country town built around gold-mining. The gold is running out, and a young engineer suggests developing agriculture, supported by irrigation, as an alternative. A new recruit to the newspaper, one J.G. Millford, arrives – and turns out to be a woman named Jenny. The play explores tensions between the all-male workforce of the newspaper and the new female reporter; between those who want to see mining continue and those who support agriculture; and the different stances of the newspaper editor and his son.

== Stage performances ==
The Torrents had its stage premiere in 1957 at the New Theatre, Stow Hall, Adelaide, produced by Mary Miller, one of the founders of that theatre. It was performed in Melbourne the following year, at the New Theatre, and in Sydney in 1962 at Norman McVicker's Pocket Playhouse in Sydenham. The cast included John Cooper, Beverley Harte and Lionel Mann, and it was produced by Robert Findlay.

Its next stage productions were not until 1995 and 1996. A reading of the play was performed at the Victorian Arts Centre in March 1995. In 1996, the State Theatre Company of South Australia dedicated its program at The Playhouse theatre to works by Australian authors, including some which had been neglected. Its production of The Torrents was directed by Marion Potts, with set design by Mary Moore. Paula Arundell played Jenny, and John Adam played the son.

== Adaptations ==
=== 1956 radio adaptation ===
It was adapted into a one-hour radio play by Joy Hollyer for the ABC in 1956. Three performances were broadcast, one in March 1956, with Beverley Dunn as J.G. Milford, another in November 1956, with Margo Lee as J.G. Milford, Kevin Brennan as the editor, Ben Gabriel as the son, and Keith Buckley as the young engineer. and the third in December 1956, in which Gwen Clarke played Jenny Milford, and Donald McTaggart played the son; also in the cast was Rodney Hall.

Another production aired in 1966, with Nonie Stewart and John Nash in major roles.

=== 1969 TV adaptation ===
The play was adapted for Australian TV in 1969. Filmink said this adaptation "seemed forgotten in newspaper reports about the recent STC/Black Swan revival of that play."

=== Musical adaptation ===
It was also adapted into the musical A Bit o' Petticoat.

== Publication ==
The Torrents was not published until 1988, when Penguin released it as part of their Australian playhouse series, and it was also included in Dale Spender's The Penguin Anthology of Australian Women's Writing. It was then reissued by Currency Press in 1996 and 2016.
