= Barbara Sisley =

Teacher of speech and drama (1878–1945)

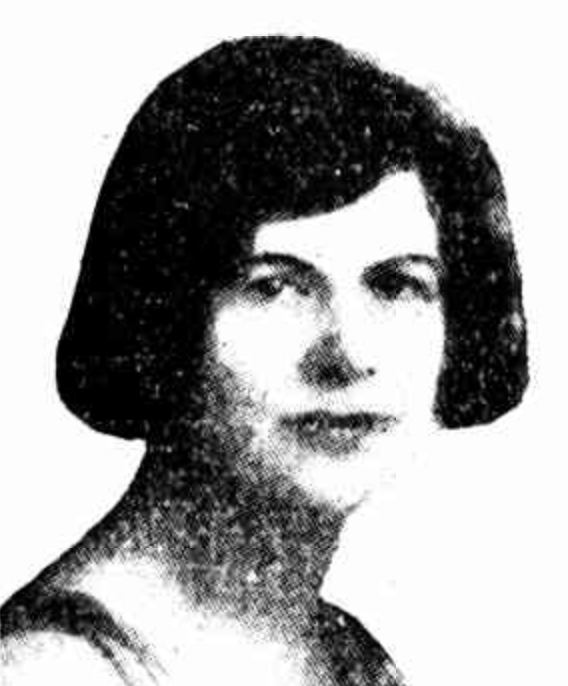
- Born: 19 March 1878; Streatham, London, England
- Died: 18 November 1945 (aged 66); Brisbane, Australia
- Education: Queen's College, Melbourne
- Occupations: Actress, teacher, theatre director

Barbara Sisley (19 March 1878 – 18 November 1945) was an English Australian actress, teacher and theatre director in Queensland, Australia. She founded and operated the Brisbane Repertory Theatre Society.

== Early life and education ==
Sisley was born on 19 March 1878 at Streatham, London, one of three daughters of Thomas Alexander Sisley, civil service clerk, and his wife Susan, née Sisley. Sisley moved to Australia when she was 11. She was educated at Queen's College, Melbourne and Manuel College in Hawthorn.

== Career ==
Sisley became one of Brisbane's first speech and drama instructors when she moved there in 1916, working at St Margaret's, Stuartholme and Somerville House. In the early-1900s Sisley helped establish the Young Women's Christian Association Drama Group and the Brisbane Shakespeare Society, where they performed an annual play. In 1923 Sisley went back to England to study with Elsie Fogerty.

Sisley and others, including Professor J. J. Stable founded the Brisbane Repertory Theatre Society in 1925. She organised tours of their productions to places like Ipswich, Toowoomba, Stanthorpe, Rockhampton, and Townsville. She was a part of the Dramatic Society of the University of Queensland, founder of the Art of Speech Association, a member of the Shakespeare Society, the Dickens Fellowship, the Lyceum Club, Authors' and Artists' Association, C.E.M.A., and the advisory panel of the Australian Broadcasting Commission for Queensland.

== Legacy ==
The Barbara Sisley Awards have been presented annually since 1947 by the Communication, Speech & Performance Teachers Inc. in her memory.

== Death ==
Sisley died on 18 November 1945 as a result of a car accident in Brisbane. During the time following her death lectures were held in memorial.
