= List of festschrifts =

The following is an initial list of notable festschrifts:

Title	Honoring	Field or genre	Editor(s)	Publisher	Year	References
Foundation's Friends	Isaac Asimov	Science fiction	Martin H. Greenberg	Tor Books	1989	
Richard Dawkins: How a Scientist Changed the Way We Think	Richard Dawkins	Evolutionary biology; Philosophy; Psychology	Alan Grafen; Mark Ridley	Oxford University Press	2006	
Stories for Chip: A Tribute to Samuel R. Delany	Samuel R. Delany	Short fiction; Essays	Bill Campbell; Nisi Shawl	Ingram	2015	
Philosophy, Ethics, and a Common Humanity	Raimond Gaita	Philosophy	Christopher Cordner	Routledge	2011	
Rereading Ancient Philosophy	M. M. McCabe	History of philosophy	Verity Harte; Raphael Woolf	Cambridge University Press	2018	
Fact and Value: Essays on Ethics and Metaphysics for Judith Jarvis Thomson	Judith Jarvis Thomson	Philosophy	Alex Byrne; Robert Stalnaker; Ralph Wedgwood	A Bradford Book	2001	
Lord of the Fantastic	Roger Zelazny	Fantasy	Martin H. Greenberg	Avon Eos	1998	

== See also ==
- Lists of books
