= Richard Dawkins: How a Scientist Changed the Way We Think =

Biography and festschrift for biologist Richard Dawkins

- Editor: Alan Grafen, Mark Ridley
- Publication date: 2006
- ISBN: 9780199291168

Richard Dawkins: How a Scientist Changed the Way We Think is a festschrift of 25 essays written in recognition of the life and work of Richard Dawkins. It was published in 2006, to coincide with the 30th anniversary of the publication of The Selfish Gene. A wide range of topics is covered from many fields including evolutionary biology, philosophy, and psychology. Space is also given to writers who are not in full agreement with Dawkins. The book is edited by two of Dawkins' former PhD students, Alan Grafen and Mark Ridley. (ISBN 9780199291168)

== Reception ==
The reviews of the book have been mixed, but the controversial title phrase, "How a Scientist Changed the Way We Think" has been explained by considering Dawkins to have worked as an influential educator and concise author, of The Selfish Gene, who promoted the key ideas of others about evolutionary biology, also including some controversial ideas which are not as widely accepted. As the author of a popular science book, Dawkins had popularized ideas by George Williams in critiquing group selection, William Hamilton on the theory of kin selection in evolution, biologist/geneticist John Maynard Smith on evolutionarily stable strategies, and Robert Trivers about reciprocal altruism and competition between siblings versus parent and child.

== Contributions ==
- Biology
  - Andrew F. Read – Ballooning Parrots and Semi-Lunar Germs
  - Helena Cronin – The Battle of the Sexes Revisited
  - John Krebs – Richard Dawkins: Intellectual Plumber—and More
  - Michael Hansell – What is a Puma?
- The Selfish Gene
  - Marian Stamp Dawkins – Living with The Selfish Gene
  - David Haig – The Gene Meme
  - Alan Grafen – The Intellectual Contribution of The Selfish Gene to Evolutionary Theory
  - Ullica Segerstråle – An Eye on the Core: Dawkins and Sociobiology
- Logic
  - Daniel C. Dennett – The Selfish Gene as a Philosophical Essay
  - Seth Bullock – The Invention of an Algorithmic Biology
  - David Deutsch – Selfish Genes and Information Flow
  - Steven Pinker – Deep Commonalities between Life and Mind
- Antiphonal voices
  - Michael Ruse – Richard Dawkins and the Problem of Progress
  - Patrick Bateson – The Nest's Tale: Affectionate Disagreements with Richard Dawkins
  - Robert Aunger – What's the Matter with Memes?
- Humans
  - Martin Daly & Margo Wilson – Selfish Genes and Family Relations
  - Randolph M. Nesse – Why a Lot of People with Selfish Genes Are Pretty Nice Except for their Hatred of The Selfish Gene
  - Kim Sterelny – The Perverse Primate
- Controversy
  - Michael Shermer – The Skeptic's Chaplain: Richard Dawkins as a Fountainhead of Skepticism
  - Richard Harries – A Fellow Humanist
  - A. C. Grayling – Dawkins and the Virus of Faith
  - Marek Kohn – To Rise Above
  - David P. Barash – What the Whale Wondered: Evolution, Existentialism, and the Search for "Meaning"
- Writing
  - Matt Ridley – Richard Dawkins and the Golden Pen
  - Philip Pullman – Every Indication of Inadvertent Solicitude
