= Vincent Czyz =

American poet

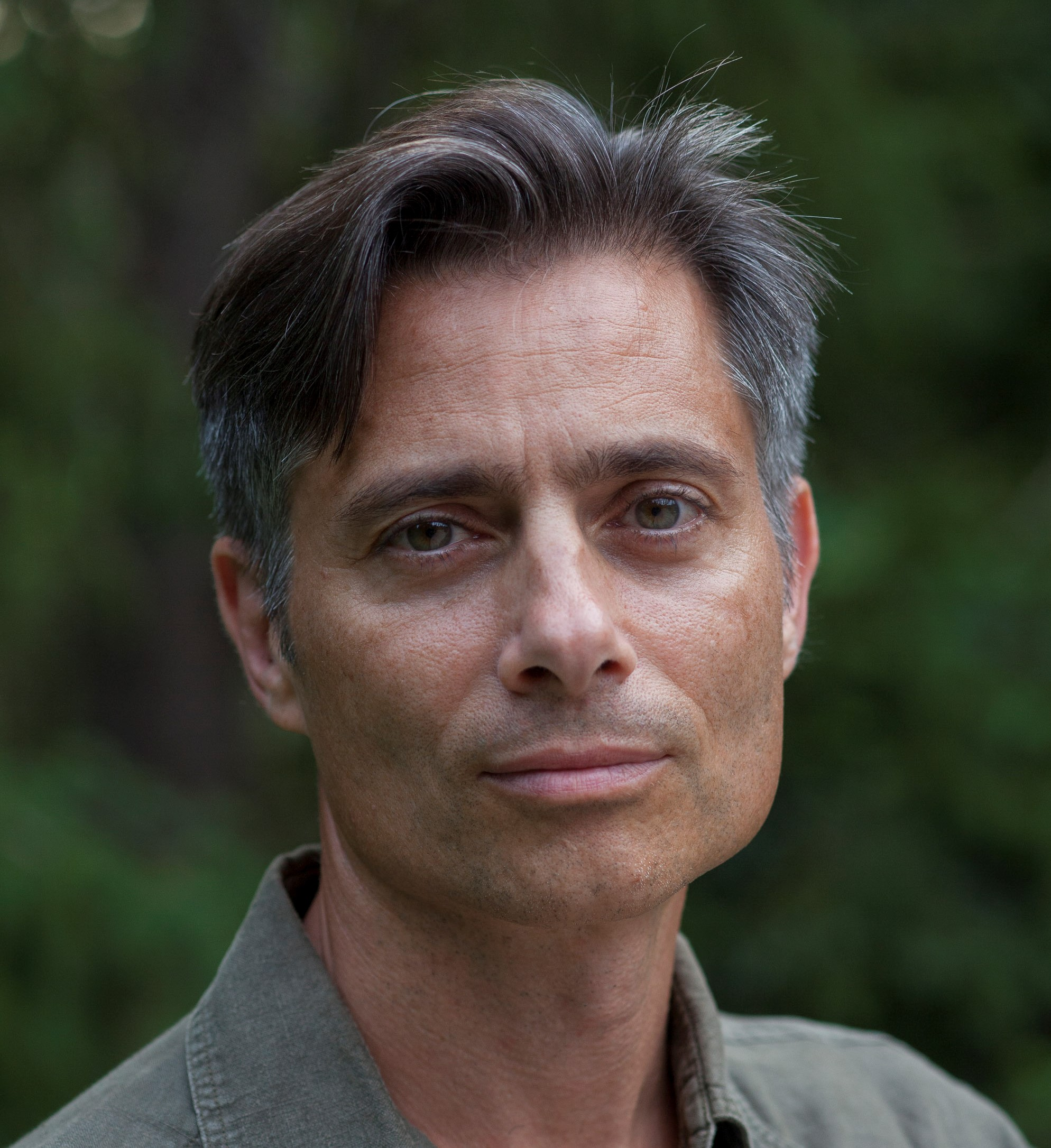
- Born: b. 1963; New Jersey, United States
- Education: Rutgers University, Columbia University (grad)
- Occupations: Writer, professor
- Writing career
- Genres: Novel, Short Story, Essay, Criticism
- Subject: Literary fiction
- Movement: Postmodernism

Vincent Czyz (/ˈtʃɛz/ Chez; born 1963) is an American writer and critic of Literary fiction. His work often explores mythological motifs, religious themes, and dreams as a substrate of reality.

== Biography ==
Vincent Czyz was born in Orange, New Jersey and raised in nearby East Orange. He graduated in 1981 as the salutatorian of his class at Lakeland Regional High School.

He received a B.A. from the Rutgers University in New Brunswick, New Jersey, an M.A. from Columbia University, and an M.F.A. from Rutgers-Newark. He lived in Istanbul, Turkey for seven years, teaching English at several Turkish universities. He also taught creative writing at The College of New Jersey. He lives in Jersey City, New Jersey with his wife, Neslihan, and their son. His older brother is former American boxer, light-heavyweight champion Bobby Czyz.

== Writing ==
Czyz is the author of a short story collection, two novels, and a collection of essays. His short stories and essays have appeared in journals, magazines, and several anthologies, including, the New England Review, Shenandoah, AGNI, The Massachusetts Review, Georgetown Review, Tin House, The Arts Fuse, Tampa Review, Boston Review, Copper Nickel, Southern Indiana Review, Skidrow Penthouse, and a contribution in the festschrift collection Stories for Chip (2015). In his prefatory note to Adrift in a Vanishing City, Samuel R. Delany characterizes Czyz's short story collection as, "a small landmark in the sedimentation of new form in fiction". Czyz's novel, The Christos Mosaic, is described by the American New Testament scholar Robert M. Price as including "genuine, radical biblical scholarship in a beautifully rendered adventure full of unforgettable characters, set in exotic locales vividly and poetically described".

== Awards ==
He is the recipient of the 1994 William Faulkner Wisdom Prize for Short Fiction, two fellowships from the NJ Council on the Arts In 2011 he was awarded Truman Capote Fellowship at Rutgers University.

== Bibliography ==
- Adrift In A Vanishing City, a collection of interlinked avant-garde stories, was published May 10, 2015; having first been released in 1998.
- The Christos Mosaic (Blank Slate Press, 2015).
- The Three Veils Of Ibn Oraybi: a novella; published July 10, 2021. The critic Diane Donovan of the Midwest Book Review stated, "Czyz weaves mystery, history, religious fervor, and social inspection into this story of struggle... Its lovely, lyrical language and thought-provoking encounters... explore the politics and psychological profiles of cultures that lived side by side...".
- The Secret Adventures of Order (2022): a collection of literary essays, creative nonfiction, and biblical exegesis.
- Sun Eye Moon Eye (Spuyten Duyvil, 2024): a novel of a Hopi descendant in "1980s America—a time of extreme social and economic change... in the heart of New York City during a time in which the city possessed a thriving music and arts scene".
- Old Man Evil (2025): a collection of a dozen Short stories in contemporary America and abroad.
