= List of awards and nominations received by Kodi Smit-McPhee =

Kodi Smit-McPhee awards and nominations
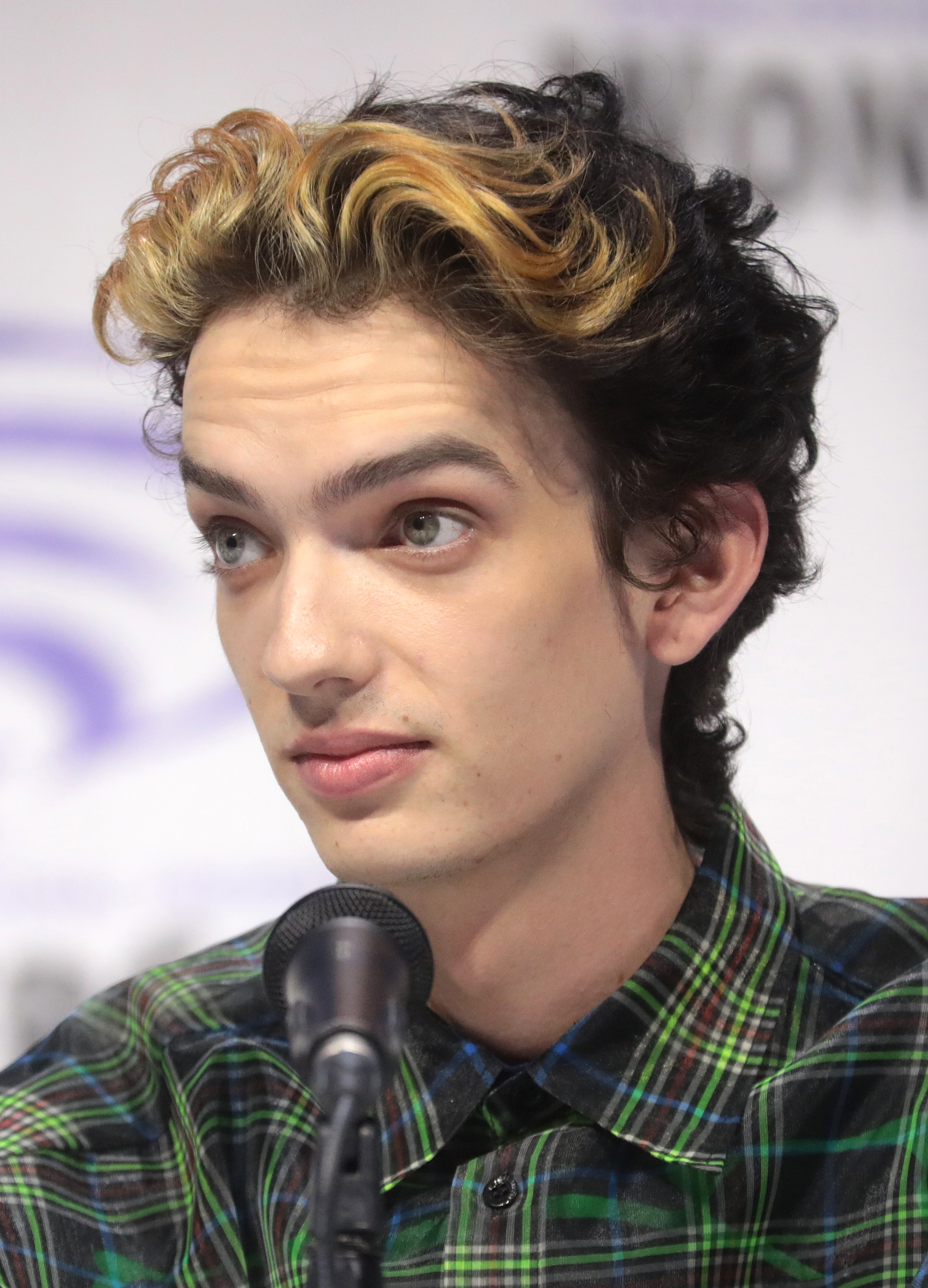
- Smit-McPhee at the 2019 WonderCon
Awards and nominations
Award	Wins	Nominations
Academy Awards	0	1
British Academy Film Awards	0	2
Critics' Choice Awards	0	4
Golden Globe Awards	1	1
Screen Actors Guild Awards	0	1

Totals (Note: Certain award groups do not simply award one winner. They acknowledge several different recipients, have runners-up, and have third place. Since this is a specific recognition and is different from losing an award, runner-up mentions are considered wins in this award tally. For simplification and to avoid errors, each award in this list has been presumed to have had a prior nomination.)
- Wins: 20
- Nominations: 41

Kodi Smit-McPhee is an Australian actor. In his early career, Smit-McPhee earned recognition as a child actor for his role in Romulus, My Father (2007), with his performance in the film earning him nomination for a AACTA Award for Best Actor in a Leading Role. He later received nominations for various youth awards for his performances in Let Me In (2010) and The Road (2009).

In 2021, Smit-McPhee had a co-starring role in Jane Campion's drama film The Power of the Dog. His critically acclaimed performance in the film earned him the Golden Globe Award for Best Supporting Actor – Motion Picture, in addition to nominations for Academy Award for Best Supporting Actor, BAFTA Award for Best Actor in a Supporting Role, Critics' Choice Movie Award for Best Supporting Actor and Screen Actors Guild Award for Best Supporting Actor. His Oscar nomination made him the fourth Australian to be nominated in the category of Best Supporting Actor, as well as the first blind person ever nominated for an acting Oscar.

== Major awards ==
=== Academy Awards ===
Year	Category	Nominated work	Result	Ref.
2022	Best Supporting Actor	The Power of the Dog	Nominated	

=== BAFTA Awards ===
Year	Category	Nominated work	Result	Ref.
2022	BAFTA Rising Star Award	—	Nominated	
2022	Best Film Actor in a Supporting Role	The Power of the Dog	Nominated	

=== Golden Globe Awards ===
Year	Category	Nominated work	Result	Ref.
2022	Best Supporting Actor – Motion Picture	The Power of the Dog	Won	

=== Screen Actors Guild Awards ===
Year	Category	Nominated work	Result	Ref.
2022	Outstanding Performance by a Male Actor in a Supporting Role	The Power of the Dog	Nominated	

== Critics' awards ==
Year	Nominated work	Category	Result	Ref.
Alliance of Women Film Journalists
2021	The Power of the Dog	Best Supporting Actor	Won	
Austin Film Critics Association
2022	The Power of the Dog	Best Supporting Actor	Won	
Boston Online Film Critics Association
2021	The Power of the Dog	Best Supporting Actor	Won	
Critics' Choice Awards
2010	The Road	Best Young Actor/Actress	Nominated	
2011	Let Me In	Best Young Actor	Nominated	
2022	The Power of the Dog	Best Supporting Actor	Nominated	
Chicago Film Critics Association
2021	The Power of the Dog	Best Supporting Actor	Won	
Florida Film Critics Circle
2021	The Power of the Dog	Best Supporting Actor	Won	
Film Critics Circle of Australia
2008	Romulus, My Father	Best Supporting Actor	Won	
2008	Romulus, My Father	Special Achievement Award	Won	
Hawaii Film Critics Society
2021	The Power of the Dog	Best Supporting Actor	Nominated	
Houston Film Critics Society
2021	The Power of the Dog	Best Supporting Actor	Won	
Iowa Film Critics Association
2021	The Power of the Dog	Best Supporting Actor	Won	
Indiana Film Journalists Association
2021	The Power of the Dog	Best Supporting Actor	Won	
Kansas City Film Critics Circle
2021	The Power of the Dog	Best Supporting Actor	Nominated	
London Film Critics' Circle
2021	The Power of the Dog	Best Supporting Actor	Won	
Los Angeles Film Critics Association
2021	That Power of the Dog	Best Supporting Actor	Won	
National Society of Film Critics
2022	The Power of the Dog	best Supporting Actor	Nominated	
New York Film Critics Circle
2021	The Power of the Dog	Best Supporting Actor	Won	
North American Film Critics Association
2022	The Power of the Dog	Best Supporting Actor	Nominated	
San Diego Film Critics Society
2022	The Power of the Dog	Best Supporting Actor	Nominated	
San Francisco Bay Area Film Critics Circle
2022	The Power of the Dog	Best Supporting Actor	Won	
Seattle Film Critics Society
2021	The Power of the Dog	Best Supporting Actor	Won	
St. Louis Film Critics Association
2021	The Power of the Dog	Best Supporting Actor	Won	
Sunset Film Critics Circle
2021	The Power of the Dog	Best Supporting Actor	Nominated	
Washington D.C. Area Film Critics Association
2021	The Power of the Dog	Best Supporting Actor	Won	
Young Artist Award
2009	Romulus, My Father	Best Performance in a Feature Film - Leading Actor	Won	

== Other awards ==
=== AACTA Awards ===
Year	Nominated work	Category	Result	Ref
2007	Romulus, My Father	Best Lead Actor	Nominated	
2007	Romulus, My Father	Best Young Acting	Won	
2010	The Road	Best International Actor	Nominated	
2010	Matching Jack	Best Supporting Actor	Nominated	

==== AACTA International Awards ====
Year	Nominated work	Category	Result	Ref
2022	The Power of the Dog	Best Supporting Actor	Won	

=== Fangoria Chainsaw Awards ===
Year	Nominated work	Category	Result	Ref
2010	The Road	Best Supporting Actor	Nominated	
2011	Let Me In	Best Actor	Nominated	

=== Satellite Awards ===
Year	Nominated work	Category	Result	Ref
2021	The Power of the Dog	Best Supporting Actor	Won	

=== Saturn Awards ===
Year	Nominated work	Category	Result	Ref
2010	The Road	Best Performance by a Younger Actor	Nominated	
2015	Dawn of the Planet of the Apes	Best Performance by a Younger Actor	Nominated	
