= Markovac (Vršac) =

Markovac Марковац (Serbian) Marcovăț (Romanian)
- Village (Selo)
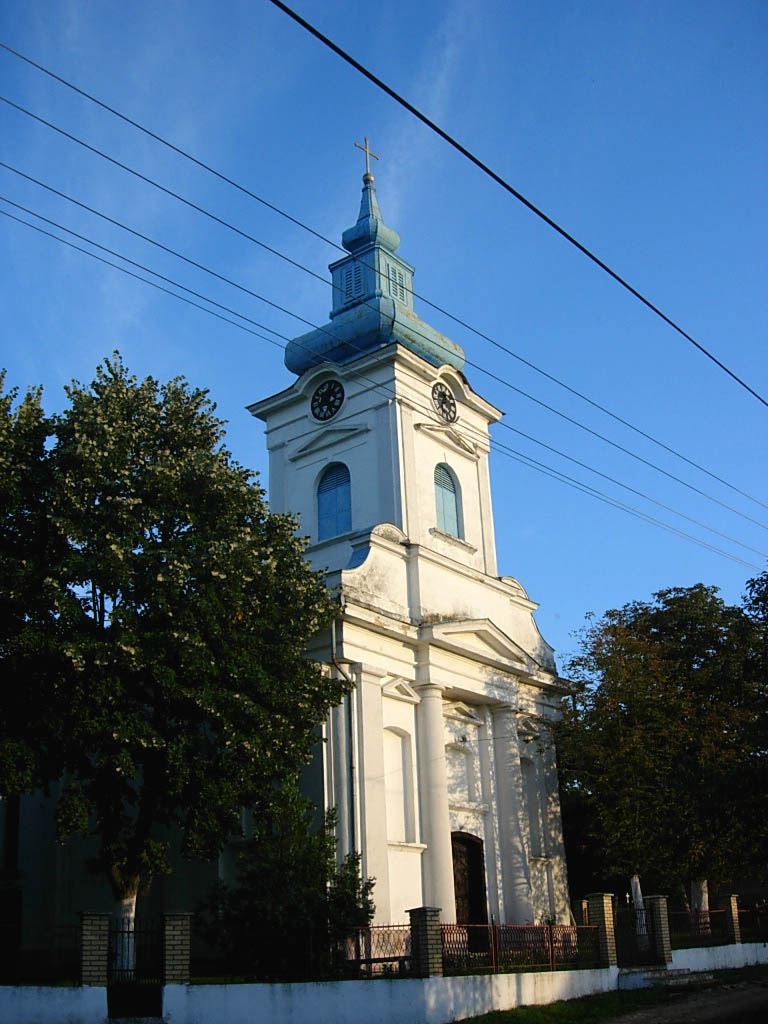
- The Romanian Orthodox Church

- Location of Markovac within Serbia Markovac (Serbia) Markovac (Europe)
- Coordinates: 45°09′04″N 21°28′09″E
- Country: Serbia
- Province: Vojvodina
- District: South Banat
- Municipality: Vršac
- Elevation: 156 m (512 ft)

Population (2022)
  - Total: 179
- Time zone: UTC+1 (CET)
  - Summer (DST): UTC+2 (CEST)
- Area code: +381(0)13
- Car plates: VŠ

Markovac (Serbian Cyrillic: Марковац; Romanian: Marcovăț; Hungarian: Márktelke) is a village located in the administrative area of the City of Vršac, South Banat District, Vojvodina, Serbia. The village has a population of 179 people (2022 census).

== Name ==
The village is known by several names: Serbian Cyrillic: Марковац or Serbian: Markovac; Romanian: Marcovăț, Hungarian: Márktelke, German: Markowatz.

== History ==
12th century BC ornitho-morphic pendants were found in Markovac-Grunjac.

The village was first time recorded in 1749. In that time it was part of the Banat of Temeswar, which was a separate province of the Habsburg monarchy. According to 1753 data, it was mainly populated by Romanians. In 1778, the Banat of Temeswar was abolished and village was included into Temesch County within the Habsburg Kingdom of Hungary. In 1848-1849, the village was part of autonomous Serbian Vojvodina and in 1849-1860 part of the Voivodeship of Serbia and Banat of Temeschwar. After the abolition of the voivodeship in 1860, the village was again included into Temesch County. In 1918, following the end of World War I, Markovac (as part of the Banat, Bačka and Baranja region) became part of the Kingdom of Serbia and subsequently part of the Kingdom of the Serbs, Croats and Slovenes (known as Yugoslavia since 1929). During World War II, from 1941 to 1944, the German Wehrmacht occupied the village. During this time, the village was part of the Banat region, which had special autonomous status within the German-occupied puppet state of Serbia. After World War II, Markovac was included into the new socialist Yugoslavia. From 1944, it was part of autonomous Yugoslav Vojvodina, which was included into socialist Yugoslav Serbia in 1945. Since 2006, Markovac is part of an independent Serbia.

== Demographics ==
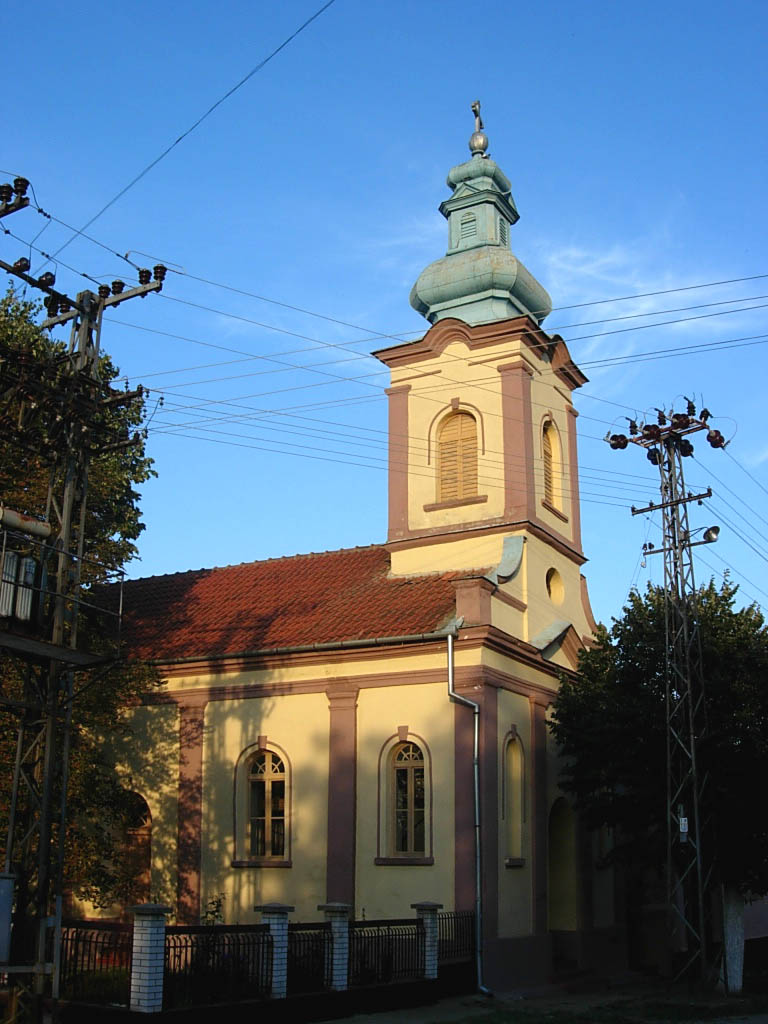
The Greek Catholic church

=== Historical population ===
- 1961: 1,042
- 1971: 817
- 1981: 717
- 1991: 570
- 2002: 329
- 2011: 249
- 2022: 179

=== Ethnic groups ===
According to data from the 2022 census, ethnic groups in the village include:

- 138 (77%) Romanians
- 29 (16.2%) Serbs
- Others/Undeclared/Unknown

== Notable people ==
- Romulus Gaita (b 1922 - d May 1996), father of Australian philosopher Raimond Gaita, lived in Markovac until 1935 when at the age of 13 he fled the village

== See also ==
- List of places in Serbia
- List of cities, towns and villages in Vojvodina
