= Raimond Gaita =

Australian philosopher (born 1946)

- Born: Raimund Gaita; 14 May 1946 (age 80); Dortmund, Westphalia, Germany
- Spouse: Yael Gaita

Philosophical work
- Era: Contemporary philosophy
- Main interests: Moral philosophy
- Notable works: Romulus, My Father

Raimond "Rai" Gaita (born Raimund Joseph Gaita; 14 May 1946) is a German-born Australian philosopher and writer, best known for his 1998 biography about his early life, titled Romulus, My Father. He was foundation professor of philosophy at the Australian Catholic University, and professor of moral philosophy at King's College London.

== Early life and education ==
Raimond Joseph Gaita (born Raimund) was born in Dortmund, Westphalia, Germany, on 14 May 1946, to a Yugoslav-born Romanian father, Romulus Gaiță (28 December 1922 – May 1996) and a German mother, Christine ("Christel") Anna Dörr (16 November 1928 – 1958). In Germany, from 1942 to 1945, Romulus was employed as a smith and metal worker. The Gaita family migrated to Australia from Yugoslavia in April 1950, just before Raimond turned four.

The family lived in an isolated shack in the Victorian countryside. His father, along with his father's best friend Pantelimon Hora, were strong moral influences during his childhood. His mother suffered from an undiagnosed mental illness, which caused her to be promiscuous, and she started a relationship with Hora's brother. Raimund was exposed to several traumas as a child, including the suicide of his mother in 1958.

He attended Baringhup Primary School, St. Patrick's College, Ballarat and Melbourne High School in Melbourne, graduating in 1963. In 1968 he graduated from the University of Melbourne (BA Hons, Philosophy), before earning an MA (First Class Honours) there in 1972.

In 1983 he received a PhD from the University of Leeds in England, with R. F. Holland serving as his supervisor.

== Career ==
=== Academia ===
From 1970 to 1972 Gaita lectured in philosophy, Melbourne Teachers' College, and the following year moved to England and started work as a tutor at Leeds University, which he did until 1975. From 1976 he lectured at the University of Kent at Canterbury, before being appointed to King's College London in 1977, a position he maintained for 12 years until 1999.

During this time, he was appointed Foundation Research Professor of Philosophy at the Institute of Advanced Research at the Australian Catholic University (ACU) in 1993, a title he retained 1998, becoming Foundation Professor of Philosophy, at ACU from 1999 until 2011. Also from 1999 to 2011, he was Professor of Moral Philosophy at King's College London London.

In 2012 he was appointed emeritus professor of moral philosophy at King's College London, as well as professorial fellow in the Melbourne Law School and at the Faculty of Arts at the University of Melbourne. TFrom 2019, he has been Honorary Professorial Fellow at Melbourne Law School.

He regards philosophy as a vocation rather than a career.

=== Writing ===
The story of his childhood and the lives of Gaita's family members and close friends is told in his memoir Romulus, My Father. He wrote it over a few weeks after Gaita gave the eulogy at his father's funeral, and after its publication in 1998 it became an instant bestseller.

He has also written many books and articles on moral philosophy.

In November 2023, he published Justice And Hope: Essays, Lectures and Other Writings, in which he covers topics from Donald Trump to asylum seekers in Australia to reconciliation, Edited by Scott Stephens, some of the writings in this collection date from the 1990s, but all are relevant to today's world. With this book he hoped to reach the younger generation and show that "the world is good despite all the suffering in it". He dedicated the book to his grandchildren.

== Other activities ==
As a public intellectual, Gaita has contributed to public debate about reconciliation, collective responsibility, the role of morality in politics, the Holocaust, genocide, crimes against humanity, and educational topics.

Until around 2015, Gaita hosted a series of public lectures given by other philosophers, first at Australian Catholic University and then at the University of Melbourne, called "The Wednesday Lectures". He has a strong belief in having conversations with others "not when you've done your thinking, but in order to think".

In 2018, he held a seminar for Year 11 and 12 philosophy students at Melbourne Grammar School, following an earlier visit during which he discussed Romulus, My Father with Year 9 students.

In May 2024 The Conversation published an essay based on the recent Jim Carlton Integrity Lecture delivered by Gaita at the Melbourne Law School, about the moral and philosophical elements pertaining to the Israeli-Palestine War.

== Awards and recognition ==
=== Books ===
Romulus My Father won the Nettie Palmer Prize for Non-Fiction in the Victorian Premier's Literary Award, and was shortlisted for the Queensland Premier's Literary Awards for Contribution to Public Debate, the Braille Book of the Year, and the National Biography Award. It was nominated by the New Statesman, London, as one of the best books of 1999 and, in 2000, by The Australian Financial Review as one of the ten best books of the decade. It was published by Text Publishing in its Text Classics series in 2017.

After a lot of persistence on the part of Richard Roxburgh, the story was made into a feature film of the same name in 2007 by Roxburgh. Robert Connolly and John Maynard produced the film, Eric Bana played Romulus, and Kodi Smit-McPhee, then aged nine, was selected to play the young Raimund – a role for which he won the AACTA Award for Best Young Actor.

A Common Humanity: Thinking about Love and Truth and Justice was nominated by The Economist as one of the best books of 2000.

The Philosopher's Dog was shortlisted for the New South Wales Premier's Literary Awards, 2003 and The Age Book of the Year, 2003. It was nominated by the Kansas City Star as one of the ten best books of 2005.

=== Personal honours ===
- 2002: Fellow of the Australian Academy of the Humanities
- 2009: Doctor Honoris Causa, University of Antwerp, Belgium, "for his exceptional contribution to contemporary moral philosophy and for his singular contribution the role of the intellectual in today's academic world".
- 2011: Festschrift, edited by Christopher Cordner of the University of Melbourne: Philosophy, Ethics, and a Common Humanity: Essays in Honour of Raimond Gaita (Routledge)
- 2011: International conference held by Flinders University, Adelaide: A Sense for Humanity: The Ethical Thought of Raimond Gaita
- 2014: Festschrift, edited by Craig Taylor and Melinda Graefe ,Sense for Humanity: The Ethical Thought of Raimond Gaita (Monash University Press); with contributions from conference delegates J. M. Coetzee, Robert Manne, Barry Hill, English poet and playwright Nick Drake (who wrote the screenplay for Romulus, My Father), and others.

== Personal life ==
Rai is married to Yael Gaita, and each of them have two daughters from prior marriages. One of his step-daughters is Michelle Lesh, and one of his daughters is Katerina. In 2004 Rai and Yael bought land in central Victoria, not far from where he lived as a child, and Raimund found that the move brought back memories of the pain he suffered as a child. Yael is Jewish and Israeli.

Gaita was diagnosed with Parkinson's disease in late 2021, but continues to live a life governed by his moral convictions. He has been on climate change rallies in Melbourne with Katerina, despite the discomfort of pouring rain, in an act of civil disobedience with Extinction Rebellion.

== Quote ==
Gaita said in 2024:

For me to be a moral philosopher is basically to try to understand what this strange thing we call morality is. Ours is a society in which we discuss things. And I think of that as the deepest form of hope.

== Selected bibliography ==
=== Books ===
- Gaita, Raimond, ed. (1990). Value and understanding : essays for Peter Winch. London: Routledge.
- — (1991). Good and evil : an absolute conception. London: Macmillan.
- — (1998). Romulus, my father. Melbourne: Text Publishing.
- A Common Humanity: Thinking about Love and Truth and Justice, Melbourne: Text Publishing, 1999; London & New York: Routledge, 2000.
- The Philosopher's Dog, Melbourne: Text Publishing, 2002.
- Why the War Was Wrong (ed.), Melbourne: Text Publishing, 2003.
- Breach of Trust: Truth, Morality and Politics, Melbourne: Black Inc., 2004.
- Good and Evil: An Absolute Conception, Revised edition, London & New York: Routledge 2004.
- Gaza: Morality, Law and Politics (ed.), Perth: University of Western Australia Press, 2010.
- Essays on Muslims and Multiculturalism (ed.), Melbourne: Text Publishing, 2011.
- Singing For All He's Worth: Essays in Honour of J. G. Rosenberg, Alex Skovron, Raimond Gaita and Alex Miller (eds.), Sydney: Picador, 2011.
- After Romulus, Melbourne: Text Publishing, 2011.
- Who's Afraid of International Law (ed. with Gerry Simpson), Monash University Publishing, 2017
- Justice And Hope: Essays, Lectures and Other Writings (Melbourne University Press, November 2023)

Many translations of The Philosopher's Dog were published, including in Dutch, Korean, Chinese, Turkish, and Portuguese.

=== Essays ===
- Gaita, Raimond (December 1995). "Remembering the Holocaust : absolute value and the nature of evil". Quadrant. 39 (12): 7–15.
- — (May 1996). "Remorse and the depiction of evil". Turnings of Attention. Quadrant. 40 (5): 33–36.
- — (July–August 1996). "Romulus Gaita". Turnings of Attention. Quadrant. 40 (7–8): 22–25.
