= Hound of Music =

Satirical theatre production

Hound of Music: A Horrible Comedy! is a satirical musical originally performed at the Princess Theatre in Brisbane, Queensland, on 16-24 December 1986. The production was directed by David Pyle and Sean Mee. Following the success of the previous two productions at La Boite Theatre, The Paisley Pirates of Penzance (1985) and Conway Christ Redneck Superstar (1985), Hound of Music was staged at the much larger Princess Theatre. The production featured more than 250 cast and crew members. The story was based on The Sound of Music and Frankenstein with reference to numerous horror movies to create an "Austro-goth comedy". The production satirised the conservative Queensland State Government led by Premier Joh Bjelke-Petersen.

== History ==
Conway Christ Redneck Superstar was the third of six musicals produced between 1985 and 1996 by ToadShow Pty Ltd. All productions blended two or more well-known stories and interspersed the story with popular songs while satirising local politics and providing social comment.

ToadShow produced The Paisley Pirates of Penzance (1985), Conway Christ Redneck Superstar (1985) and Hound of Music (1986), SherWoodstock (1990), Phantoad of the Opera (1991) and Glamalot (1996). Theatre critic John Harris said, "The musicals are unique to Brisbane, conceived and written by a combination of talents undoubtedly unlike any to be found anywhere else in the world. They employ music with a rock beat, satire with a light touch, and casts of dozens, scores, or hundreds, depending upon the venue."

== Synopsis ==
The story is set in Brisberg, Austria where the Nazis are on the rise. Because of her tendency to turn into a werewolf, Maria is banished to the convent of the Little Nuns of Christ the Social Worker. Not suited to the church, Maria accepts a position at the castle of the mysterious Dr Georg Von Frankentrapp. Maria's role is to act as a therapist to the Von Frankentrapp children who are the results of his experiments. Maria teaches the children to sing and dance. Following the Nazi invasion of Austria, Dr Von Frankentrapp is drafted into the public service. The Von Frankentrapp children are invited to compete at a local singing festival. When the children are announced as the winners, the Nazis realise they have escaped. The Von Frankentrapps are hunted down by the Nazis but Maria turns into a werewolf and chases off the Nazis allowing the whole family to escape to freedom.

== Music ==
- "Bad Moon Rising"
- "Don't Let Me Be Misunderstood"
- "There Are Worse Things I Could Do"
- "The Loco-Motion"
- "Do-Re-Mi"
- "Power and the Passion"
- "I Heard It Through the Grapevine"
- "Dedicated to the One I Love"
- "Rhythm of Life"
- "Fascist Groove Thang"
- "I Say a Little Prayer"
- "River Deep – Mountain High"
- "Puppet on a String"
- "I Couldn't Live Without Your Love"
- "Tomorrow Belongs To Me"
- "Life Is Great in the Sunshine State"
- "Don't Sleep in the Subway"
- "Space Oddity"
- "We Can Work It Out"

== Cast ==
- Maria - Justine Anderson
- Dr Von Frankentrapp - Pat Leo
- Baroness Didi - Toni Mott
- Weasel - Mary-Ann Jolley
- Reverend Mother Dan - Brian Cavanagh
- Sister Peter - Sally Patience
- Herr Kurt Schurrt - Stephen Clark
- Herr Karl Lipp - Paul Sugars

== Reception ==
Writing in the Daily Sun, John Harris said, "The most entertaining and multi-talented musical to hit Brisbane this year had its audience yelling and stamping for more." Adrienne Brown called it "one of the funniest pieces of theatre seen in this town for some time." Kerry McGovern in Time Off wrote, "It's a mixture of new and old, of common and vulgar, of music and dance, with a cast of 1000s."
