= Russell Dykstra =

Australian actor of screen, stage and TV

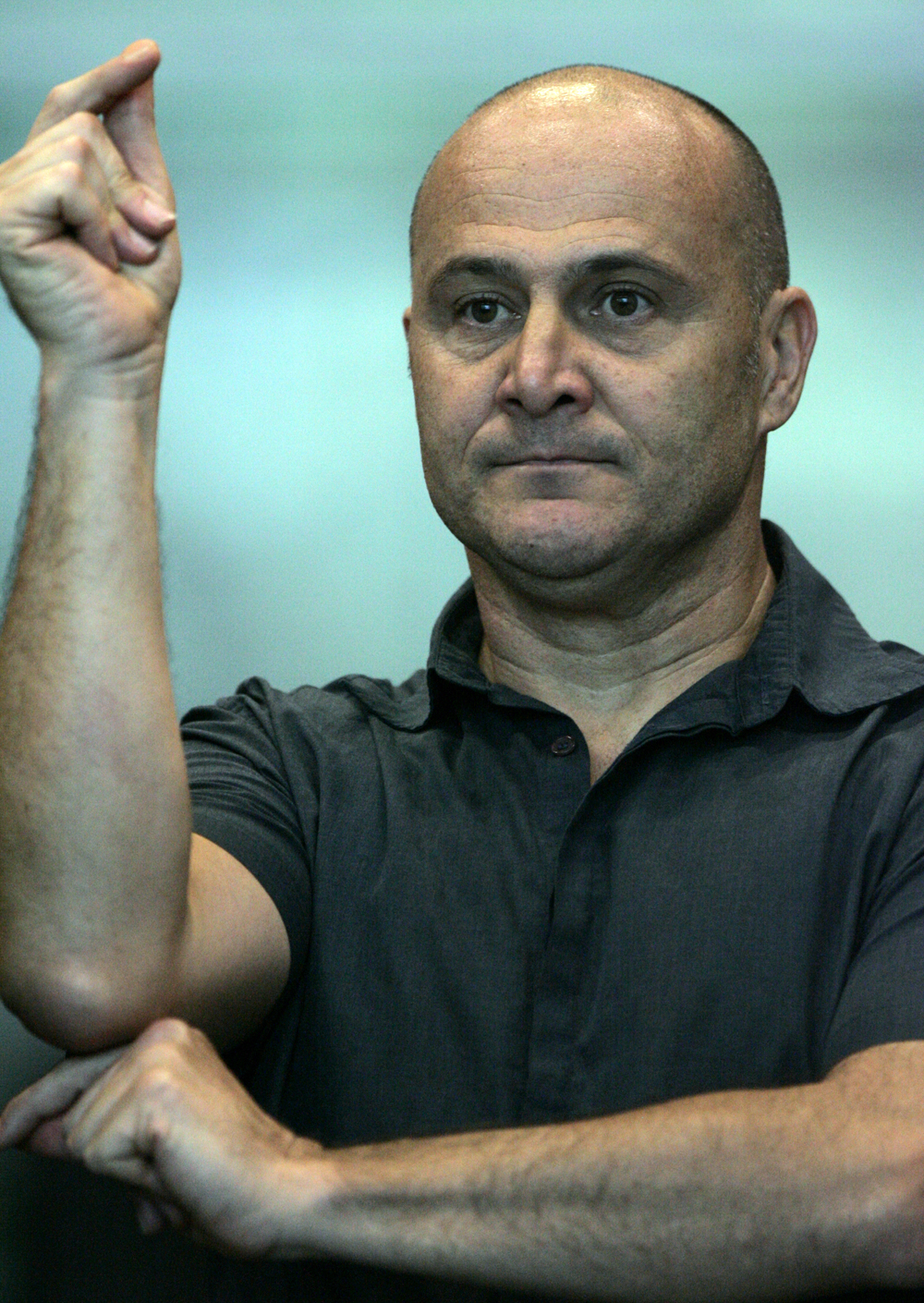
- Dykstra in 2013, at the Addams Family rehearsal
- Born: 31 December 1966 (age 59); Brisbane, Queensland, Australia
- Education: University of Southern Queensland
- Occupation: Actor
- Known for: Soft Fruit; Romulus, My Father; Rake; Irreverent

Russell Dykstra (born 31 December 1966) is an Australian actor of screen, stage and TV.

== Early life ==
Dykstra grew up in the Brisbane suburb of Calamvale.

Dykstra first appeared on stage at age 10 in a theatre production of Toad of Toad Hall. He later studied acting at the University of Southern Queensland, graduating with a Diploma of Creative Arts in 1987, and in his early career worked alongside fellow actor Geoffrey Rush with the Grin and Tonic theatre troupe. Dykstra also studied at the school of Jacques Lecoq in Paris and Philippe Gaulier in London.

== Career ==
Dykstra made his feature film debut in the critically acclaimed Soft Fruit, directed by Christina Andreef, for which he received an AFI Award for Best Actor in a Leading Role (1999) and a Film Critics’ Circle Award nomination (2000).

Dykstra's one-man show Children of the Devil had previously toured nationally in 1996–98 with funding from the Australia Council, earning him a Matilda Award and a Victorian Green Room Award nomination for Best Actor.

In 2007 Dykstra was nominated for an AFI Award for Best Supporting Actor for his performance in Romulus, My Father directed by Richard Roxburgh. Other film appearances include Oranges and Sunshine, Clubland, Lantana, Garage Days, Ned Kelly, The View from Greenhaven, The Wannabes and Hey, Hey, It's Esther Blueburger.

Dykstra's theatre credits are extensive, including God of Carnage, The Wonderful World of Dissocia, The Unlikely Prospect of Happiness, for the Sydney Theatre Company and Babyteeth, Ray’s Tempest, The Underpants, The Laramie Project, Yibiyung and The Ham Funeral for Company B. His performances in Toy Symphony and Stuff Happens earning him national theatre Helpmann Awards for Best Supporting Actor in 2006 and 2008 and a Sydney Theatre Award (2007). Dykstra has also worked with the Malthouse Theatre, Theatre of Image, Griffin Theatre, Ensemble, La Boite Theatre and Queensland Theatre Company.

Television credits include the Australian TV series Spirited, Wild Boys, My Place, Scorched, BlackJack (film series), Loot, All Saints and White Collar Blue.

Dykstra is perhaps most well known for his portrayal of the character Barney, in the award-winning ABC TV series Rake.

In 2013 Dykstra appeared as Uncle Fester in the Australian production of the Broadway musical The Addams Family. For this performance Dykstra was honored with his third Helpmann Award, for Best Male Actor in a Supporting Role in a Musical (2013).

Dykstra played Pumbaa in the Australian tour of Disney's The Lion King. For this performance Dykstra received a Sydney Theatre Award nomination for Best Performance by an Actor in a Musical (2013) and was nominated Best Male Actor in a Supporting Role in a Musical at the 14th Annual Helpmann Awards.

In 2015 Dykstra won his second Equity Award, for Most Outstanding Ensemble in a Drama Series, for his portrayal of Barney in the ABC TV series Rake.

In 2016 Dykstra received an AACTA Award Nomination for Best Supporting Actor in a Television Drama for his performance as Barney in season 4 of Rake.

More recently Dykstra portrayed Lester in the Matchbox Pictures production Irreverent streaming on Peacock in the US and Netflix Australia. He also appeared in the ABC TV series Fires and In Limbo produced by Bunya Productions.

In 2024 Dykstra appeared in the ABC TV production of Ladies in Black.

Dykstra was honoured as a Fellow of the University at University of Southern Queensland (USQ)on September 26, 2024.

== Filmography ==
=== Film ===
Year	Title	Role	Notes
1999	Paperback Hero	Stage Hand	Feature film
1999	Soft Fruit	Bo	Feature film AFI Award for Best Actor in a Leading Role (1999); Film Critics’ Circle Award nomination (1999)
2001	Lantana	Neil Toohey (Mystery Man)	Feature film
2001	Beach Story	Frank	Short film
2001	Garage Days	Bruno	Feature film
2002	Stuffed Bunny	Man	Short film
2001	Versus	Jay	Short film
2002	BlackJack: Murder Archive	Buchanan	TV film
2002	Ned Kelly	Wild Wright	Feature film
2002	The Wannabes	Marcus	Feature film
2004	Loot	Bruno Batelli	TV movie
2004	BlackJack: Sweet Science	Buchanan	TV film
2004	Amorality Tale	Brian Chappell	Short film
2005	BlackJack: In the Money	Buchanan	TV film
2005	BlackJack: Ace Point Game	Buchanan	TV film
2005	The Water Diary	Rog (Father)	Short film
2007	Clubland	Shane	Feature film
2007	Romulus, My Father	Mitru	Feature film AFI Award Nomination for Best Supporting Actor (2007)
2007	BlackJack: Ghosts	Buchanan	TV film
2007	Hey Hey It's Esther Blueburger	Osmond Blueburger	Feature film
2008	Scorched	Keith	TV film
2008	The View from Greenhaven	Tim	Feature film
2008	The Adventures of Charlotte and Henry	Henry's Dad / Tough Guy	TV movie
2009	Nightwalking	Voices	Short film
2010	Oranges and Sunshine	Dan	Feature film
2013	Maiden	Mick	Short film
2018	Slam	Paul Koustakidis	Film

=== Television ===
Year	Title	Role	Notes
1996	Medivac	Fitzpatrick	TV series, episode 12
2000	Bondi Banquet	Rufus	TV series
2001	Water Rats	Tino	TV series, season 6, 2 episodes
2001	Grass Roots	Bill Hooks	TV series, season 2, episode 8: "Cars"
2002	BackBerner	Mr Dennis McCauley	TV series
2003	White Collar Blue	Dale Trindle	TV series, season 2, episode 15
2003	All Saints	Grant Jenkins	TV series, season 7, episode 4: "Wolf"
2009	My Place	Mr. Merry	TV series, 2 episodes
2009	Spirited	Adam One	TV series, season 1, 8 episodes
2010–16	Rake	Barney 'Barnyard' Meagher	TV series, seasons 1–4, 32 episodes Equity Award for Most Outstanding Performance by an Ensemble in a Drama Series
2011	Wild Boys	Winston	TV series, 2 episodes
2021	Why Are You Like This	Secret Boy	TV series, episode 2: "The Pressures of Late Capitalism"
2021	Fires	David Jasic	TV miniseries, 2 episodes
2022	Irreverent	Lester	TV series, 10 episodes
2023	Last King of the Cross	Bartuccio	TV series, episode 3
2023	In Limbo	Frank	TV miniseries, 6 episodes
2024	Ladies in Black	Stefan Szombathelyi	TV series, 6 episodes

== Theatre ==
=== As actor ===
Year	Title	Role	Venue / Co.
1981	Peter Rabbit	Tommy Brock	Arts Theatre, Brisbane
1988	Macbeth	Macbeth	Grin and Tonic
1988	A Midsummer Night’s Dream	Helena	Grin and Tonic
1988; 1989	Hamlet	Hamlet	Grin and Tonic
1989	Gilgamesh	Enkidu	Grin and Tonic
1989	Macbeth	Porter / Defence Lawyer	Grin and Tonic
1989	Our Country’s Good	Various roles	Grin and Tonic
1989	Troilus and Cressida	Priam the King	Old Museum Building, Brisbane with Grin and Tonic
1990	Little Wings	Baby	Grin and Tonic
1990	Dreamworld	Various roles	Natural Theatre Company
1990	Playing for Time		La Boite Theatre, Brisbane
1990	Shimada	Billy	Cremorne Theatre, Brisbane with Queensland Theatre
1990	The Ring Cycle	Alberich	Cremorne Theatre, Brisbane with QPAC
1992	Motor Bill and the Lovely Caroline		Queensland Arts Council
1992; 1993; 1994	Body Slam	Circus Style Performer	La Boite Theatre, Brisbane, Wharf Theatre, Sydney, Princess Theatre, Brisbane, Space Theatre, Adelaide, Malthouse Theatre, Melbourne with Rock 'n' Roll Circus
1993	Knock 'Em Dead		Queensland Arts Council
1993	And a Nightingale Sang		Cremorne Theatre, Brisbane
1994	Top Pops		Queensland Philharmonic Orchestra
1994	Greek Theatre Project		University of Southern Queensland
1994	Worlds Apart		Queensland Theatre
1994	The Winter’s Tale	Archidamus, a lord of Bohemia / Norman	Suncorp Theatre, Brisbane with Queensland Theatre
1994	The Gift of the Gorgon	Attendant Spirit / Guard / Soldier	Suncorp Theatre, Brisbane with Queensland Theatre
1995	Gigi		Queensland Theatre
1995	Carmen	Lillias Pastia	Lyric Opera of Queensland
1995	Miss Bosnia	Boris / Lidija	La Boite Theatre, Brisbane
1996	Glamalot	Sir Galahad	Queensland with ToadShow
1996	Snapshots from Home		The Paint Factory for Brisbane Festival & Queensland tour
1996; 1998	Children of the Devil	One man show (various characters)	Canberra, La Boite Theatre, Brisbane, Majestic Cinemas, Sydney, Metro Arts, Brisbane, Carlton Courthouse, Melbourne
1998	A Beautiful Life	Ahmad	La Boite Theatre, Brisbane with Matrix Theatre for Brisbane Festival
1999	The Taming of the Shrew	Wandering Minstrel	
1999	The Imaginary Invalid	Beralde / Dr Krahper	Ensemble Theatre, Sydney
1999	The Milemonium Project		Glen Street Theatre, Sydney
2000	Below	John	Stables Theatre, Sydney with Griffin Theatre Company
2000	The Ham Funeral	Second Relative	Belvoir Street Theatre, Sydney
2001	The Gypsy Boy	Zazel	Seymour Centre, Sydney
2001	The Laramie Project	Andy Paris / Phillip Dubois / Matt Galloway / Stephen Mead Johnson / Jonas Slanaker / Jeffrey	Belvoir Street Theatre, Sydney
2003	The Underpants	Versati	Belvoir Street Theatre, Sydney
2004	The Odyssey		Company B workshop, Perth
2004	The Unlikely Prospect of Happiness	Ben O'Sullivan	Sydney Theatre with STC
2005	Ray's Tempest	Boris / Doctor / TV Presenter	Belvoir Street Theatre, Sydney
2005	Stuff Happens	Donald Rumsfeld	Seymour Centre, Sydney, Comedy Theatre, Melbourne
2006	Not Like Beckett	Walter Walloon Beckett	Malthouse Theatre, Melbourne
2007	Toy Symphony	Various roles	Belvoir Street Theatre, Sydney
2008	Violet Time	Liam	National Playwrighting Festival
2008	Rock, Paper, Scissors	Ronnie	National Playwrighting Festival
2008	Yibiyung	Doctor	Belvoir Street Theatre, Sydney, Malthouse Theatre, Melbourne
2009	The Wonderful World of Dissocia	Passenger 3 / Oath Taker / Attendant / Goat / Biffer / Nurse 2	Wharf Theatre with STC & MTC
2009	God of Carnage	Michael	Sydney Opera House with STC
2012	Babyteeth	Gideon	Belvoir Street Theatre, Sydney
2013	The Addams Family	Uncle Fester	Capitol Theatre, Sydney with Newtheatricals
2013–2015	The Lion King	Pumbaa	Capitol Theatre, Sydney, Lyric Theatre, Brisbane, Regent Theatre, Melbourne, Crown Theatre, Sydney with Disney Theatrical Productions
2017	Born Yesterday	Harry Brock	Southbank Theatre, Melbourne with MTC
2018	Twelfth Night	Malvolio	Southbank Theatre, Melbourne with MTC
2024	Holding the Man	Neil Armstrong / various roles	Belvoir Street Theatre, Sydney

=== As devisor / director ===
Year	Title	Role	Venue / Co.
1991	Playing for Time	Playwright / Director	La Boite Theatre, Brisbane
1996	Caca Courage	Director	Cremorne Theatre, Brisbane with D'Arts Program
1996; 1998	Children of the Devil	Playwright / Devisor	Canberra, La Boite Theatre, Brisbane, Majestic Cinemas, Sydney, Metro Arts, Brisbane, Carlton Courthouse, Melbourne
1997	Who Nose Romeo and Juliet?	Director	Queensland University of Technology with Vena Cava Theatre Company
1998	The Marriage of Figaro	Director	Stage X Festival & Zen Zen Do
1998	Kakos	Director	Queensland University of Technology
1999	The Milemonium Project	Writer / Devisor	Glen Street Theatre, Sydney
2003	Frocking Fantastic	Devisor	Visy Theatre, Brisbane

== Awards and nominations ==
Award	Year	Category	Result	Work
Green Room Award	1998	Best Male Actor	Nominated	Children of the Devil
Matilda Award	1998	Best Male Actor	Won	Children of the Devil
Film Critics’ Circle Award	1999	Best Male Actor	Nominated	Soft Fruit
Australian Film Institute Award	1999	Best Actor in a Leading Role	Won	Soft Fruit
Helpmann Award	2006	Best Male Actor in a Supporting Role in a Play	Won	Stuff Happens
Australian Film Institute Award (AFI)	2007	Best Supporting Actor	Nominated	Romulus, My Father
Critics' Circle Theatre Award	2007	Best Actor in a Supporting Role	Won	Toy Symphony
Helpmann Award	2008	Best Male Actor in a Supporting Role in a Play	Won	Toy Symphony
Equity Award	2011	Most Outstanding Ensemble in a Drama Series	Won	RAKE Series 1
USQ Alumnus Awards	2013	Outstanding Alumnus of the Year	Won	Outstanding Achievement
Helpmann Award	2013	Best Male Actor in a Supporting Role in a Musical	Won	The Addams Family
Critics' Circle Theatre Award	2013	Best Performance by an Actor in a Musical	Nominated	The Lion King
Canberra Film Festival Award	2013	Best Performance	Won	Maiden
Helpmann Award	2014	Best Male Actor in a Supporting Role in a Musical	Nominated	The Lion King
Equity Ensemble Award	2015	Most Outstanding Ensemble in a Drama Series	Won	RAKE Series 3
Australian Film Institute Award (AFI)	2016	Best Supporting Actor in a Television Drama	Nominated	RAKE Series 4
