= Helena Cronin =

British Darwinian philosopher, rationalist (born 1942)

Helena Cronin (born 1942) is a British Darwinian philosopher and rationalist. She is the co-director of the Centre for Philosophy of Natural and Social Science and the Darwin Centre at the London School of Economics. Her 1991 book, The Ant and the Peacock: Altruism and Sexual Selection from Darwin to Today brought her public attention; she has published and broadcast widely since.

== Life and work ==
Cronin attended Henrietta Barnett School in Hampstead Garden Suburb.

She is co-editor of Darwinism Today, a series of short books in evolutionary theory. She writes popular articles for newspapers such as The Guardian. She is a Patron of Humanists UK.

She ran a series of seminars, "effectively a salon at the London School of Economics specialising in the implications of Darwinian theory for humans" according to Times Higher Education. The seminars featured Richard Dawkins, David Haig, Daniel Dennett, Steven Pinker and Matt Ridley among others.

Cronin was acknowledged in the preface to the second edition of 'The Selfish Gene' by Richard Dawkins.

== Reception ==
Cronin's strong rationalistic views have brought her prominence in areas including sexual selection, Darwinism, the relative abilities of males and females, and gay rights. These are discussed in turn below.

=== Altruism and sexual selection ===
The evolutionary zoologist Mark Ridley, reviewing The Ant and the Peacock in the New York Times, writes that it is a "fine book" in which Cronin uses a modern understanding of altruism (the ant) and "dangerously gaudy sexual ornamentation" (the peacock). Ridley notes that there are two reasons for sex differences like the peacock's train, and that Cronin explains them through the debate of Charles Darwin and Alfred Russel Wallace. Darwin proposed female choice: female aesthetics drive male displays. Wallace both "ignored Darwin's problem" (ornamentation) and "denied Darwin's solution" (female choice rather than natural selection). Instead, Ridley observes, Cronin explains that Wallace preferred the explanation that peacock's tails "crop up almost automatically"; he believed that female choice was both unnecessary and impossible. Ridley finds Cronin "quite amusing as she reviews the 'misogynistic opinion' of the critics of female choice", citing Cronin's example of the universally unpleasant 19th century anti-Darwinian St. George Mivart, "such is the instability of a vicious feminine caprice, that no constancy of coloration could be produced by its selective action." But curiously (notes Ridley), Darwin and Wallace swapped roles in Cronin's problem of the ant, where Darwin argued for natural selection, while Cronin quotes Wallace arguing that for human "intellectual and moral faculties", "we can only find an adequate cause in the unseen universe of Spirit." In Ridley's opinion, "The subtlest and most original insights in "The Ant and the Peacock" concern differences between Darwin's ideas and modern ideas." Ridley writes that Cronin "moves easily between the Victorians and ourselves", not entirely avoiding the danger of anachronism, "the historian's mortal sin", that this movement creates. He suspects that the book will therefore "appeal more to philosophically minded readers than to historians", but states that "luckily" evolution is "one of the more philosophical of scientific ideas", and Wallace and Darwin can survive being treated as our contemporaries.

The review of The Ant and the Peacock in Biology and Philosophy comments that Cronin's book is "Beautifully written, [with] good strong examples, a nice sense of history, flashes of humour, plain forthright conclusions."

Nils K. Oeijord, in his book Why Gould was Wrong, noted that Stephen Jay Gould Gould's criticism of Cronin was misplaced, not least since Cronin was just presenting "the new consensus in evolutionary biology—the gene-selectionist approach", which contradicted Gould's position. Oeijord noted that two well-known figures in the philosophy of evolution, John Maynard Smith and Daniel Dennett, had defended Cronin against Gould's charges.

=== Darwinism ===
The English evolutionary anthropologist Camilla Power, in A reply to Helena Cronin, described Cronin as "authoress of 'The Ant and the Peacock' [who] was pontificating .. on how Darwinian theory should inform Blairite social policy...this is a Darwinian's response". Power sets out to "nail a few myths". She attacks Cronin's claim that women are disposed to wanting a single mate, noting that monogamy is rarer than biologists thought: females resist male efforts to control them; human females too seek "extra-pair copulations (EPCs) in the jargon of evolutionary ecology", while among indigenous peoples in the Amazon, females seek "backup fathers for each offspring". Power observes that men do not necessarily run around, but guard existing mates to limit female choice, contrary to Cronin's view; and among the Aka in the Central African rainforest, men often share in childcare. "Human male strategies are quasi-female by primate standards." Power then attacks Cronin's view of the lone mother, showing that grandmothers assist their daughters' offspring. Power is critical of Cronin's "mysterious statement about women" that "'They are the species as it existed before sexual selection drove men apart'", observing that human nature evolved in "small-scale, face-to-face societies where no one was richer or poorer."

=== Male qualities ===
Edge.org, in its "Annual Question" in 2008, hosted Cronin in a piece entitled More dumbbells but more Nobels: Why men are at the top. She stated that while she had once thought that "patterns of sex differences" were the product of average genetic differences between the sexes, men favouring things, women favouring people, she had changed her opinion. The differences were "of extremes", females grouping around the mean, but males having a "vast[ly]" larger variance, so "males are almost bound to be over-represented both at the bottom and at the top. I think of this as 'more dumbbells but more Nobels'."

== Bibliography ==
- The Ant and the Peacock: Altruism and Sexual Selection from Darwin to Today Cambridge University Press, 1991.
- The Battle of the Sexes Revisited, in Richard Dawkins: how a scientist changed the way we think. Oxford University Press, 2006.
