= Glamalot =

Glamalot: Knights in white satin is a satirical theatre production originally performed at the Lyric Theatre in Brisbane on 18 January - 3 February 1996. The show was produced by the Queensland Performing Arts Trust which donated $25,000, the door takings from the final performance, to the Queensland AIDS Council. The managing artistic director was David Pyle and the director was Sean Mee. The production featured more than 60 performers on stage and a 9-piece rock band. Glamalot was described as "a wickedly wonderful send-up of the Arthurian legend and the world of phoney political promises".

== History ==
Glamalot was the final of six plays staged by ToadShow Pty Ltd between 1985 and 1996. All productions blended two well-known stories and interspersed the story with popular songs while satirising local politics and providing social comment. Glamalot took story elements from the legend of King Arthur and contemporary Queensland politics. The final performance of the production was on 3 February 1996, the same day as the Mundingburra by-election. The Labor Government lost the by-election which resulted in a change of government. In his farewell speech Premier Wayne Goss quoted Glamalot saying under his leadership for "one brief shining moment" Queensland had experienced good government.

ToadShow had produced five musicals prior to Glamalot – The Paisley Pirates of Penzance, Conway Christ Redneck Superstar, Hound of Music, SherWoodstock and Phantoad of the Opera. Theatre critic John Harris said, "The musicals are unique to Brisbane, conceived and written by a combination of talents undoubtedly unlike any to be found anywhere else in the world. They employ music with a rock beat, satire with a light touch, and casts of dozens, scores, or hundreds, depending upon the venue."

== Synopsis ==
=== ACT 1 ===
The Black Knight and Mordred are preparing for a challenge. The first man to pull the sword from the stone will win the hand in marriage of Queen Guenevere, become king and win a year's supply of beer. Meantime Sir Kay and her bumbling squire Arthur are the first to arrive at the site of the sword in the stone. Sir Kay is unhappy because Arthur has forgotten to bring her sword. While she goes off to find another weapon, Merlin the magician casts a spell on Arthur who easily pulls the sword from the stone. A crowd arrives to see the contest but it's all over, Merlin declares Arthur the once and future king. Queen Guenevere arrives to meet her king but the situation is awkward. The Black Knight and Mordred immediately begin plotting to overthrow the king. To combat the dark forces, Merlin recommends Arthur implement good government and a jousting competition to be called the All Righteous League (ARL). Arthur calls for all the knights across the land to assemble at Glamalot to audition for the ARL. Following the auditions, Arthur meets Guenevere by the lake but they are interrupted by the knights who are fishing at the lake. Arthur starts fishing but instead of catching a fish, he pulls out the Lady of the Lake who is not happy. The next day the Black Knight and Mordred are still plotting. Famed knight Sir Lancelot arrives to join the ARL. By chance he meets Queen Guenevere and the two fall immediately in love. The Knights of the Round Table assemble for the big game. They think they can't lose but they do. In the ensuing chaos, Mordred stabs Merlin to death.

=== ACT 2 ===
It's the off-season of the ARL jousting competition and the knights are bored. Arthur hears the voice of God telling him to send the knights on a quest to find the Holy Grail. Hoping to strike while the Knights of the Round Table are away, the Black Knight and his followers meet with Sir Rupert the Blackhearted who has plans to set up a rival jousting competition called the Supertable. With the dark forces gathering, the knights away and his plans in disarray, Arthur is dejected. The Lady of the Lake appears. She summons Merlin back from the dead. Together, the Lady of the Lake and Merlin summon back the Knights of the Round Table. The knights arrive just in time to do battle with the dark forces but there are many deaths. Surrounded by carnage, his kingdom lost, Arthur must travel to Avalon. Arriving in Avalon, Arthur finds all the good and bad knights have revived and are enjoying a barbecue together.

== Music ==
- Black Night
- Dancing Queen
- Spinning Wheel
- Hooked on a Feeling
- Nobody Does It Better
- I Think I Love You
- Play That Funky Music, White Boy
- Bohemian Rhapsody
- If
- Knock On Wood
- Close to You
- I Love the Nightlife
- Ballroom Blitz
- Blame it on the Boogie
- Great Gig in the Sky
- Avalon
- I've Got the Music in Me

== Cast ==
- The Black Knight - Paul Sugars
- Mordred - Mark Williams
- Morgana Le Fey - Toni Mott
- Lady Morgause - Helen Howard
- Sir Kay - Alison St Ledger
- Arthur - Donald MacKee
- Merlin the Magician - John Kenny
- Queen Guenevere - Justine Anderson
- Sir Bedevere - Andrew Buchanan
- Sir Percival - David Brown
- Lady of the Lake - Caroline Kennison
- Sir Lancelot - Simon Burvill-Holmes
- Lady Elaine - Karen Anderson
- Sir Galahad - Russell Dykstra
- Sir Rupert the Blackhearted - Pat Leo

== Reception ==
Paul Galloway said Glamalot was an "ungainly hybrid of pantomime and rock eisteddfod with a broad larrikin streak…" Alison Cotes said "The theatrical year has started with a bang – a very silly bag, but a wonderfully entertaining one at that." Writing in The Courier-Mail, Des Partridge said "It's tough, sitting there and having to constantly fight the urge to leap into the aisles and start dancing."
