= Romulus, My Father =

1998 biographical memoir by Raimond Gaita

- Author: Raimond Gaita
- Language: English
- Genre: Biography
- Publisher: The Text Publishing Company Pty. Ltd., Melbourne
- Publication date: 1998
- Publication place: Australia
- Media type: Print
- Pages: 207
- ISBN: 1-875847-61-8
- OCLC: 38833652

Romulus, My Father is a biographical memoir, first published in 1998, written by the Australian philosopher Raimond Gaita. The memoir outlines the life of his father, Romulus Gaita (1922 – May 1996).

== Plot ==
Romulus Gaita fled his hometown of Markovac in 1935 at the age of 13. He worked as a farmer apprentice until he was 17, after which he moved to Austria and eventually migrated to Australia on an assisted passage in 1950 at the age of 28, with his young wife Christine and their four-year-old son Raimond soon after the end of the Second World War. Romulus and his family were transferred to Bonegilla Migrant Reception and Training Centre, a camp near Wodonga. Romulus was then sent to Baringhup on the Loddon River, where he met two Romanian brothers Pantelimon (known as Hora) and Mitru.

The Gaițăs then moved to a farmhouse called Frogmore, where they lived for the next ten years, and where Raimond spent most of his childhood.

Christine did not stay at Frogmore to take on the responsibility as a wife and mother. She had an affair with Mitru and moved to Melbourne to be with him. As a result of the affair, they had two daughters. Mitru committed suicide before the birth of the second child. Christine later also committed suicide. Both the daughters of Christine and Mitru were adopted. Raimond is reminiscent that indeed, Christine may have had a mental illness.

After some attempts at farming, Romulus established a business supplying wrought iron furniture, popular at the time, by the way of using the skills he brought from his native country.

Romulus had also suffered from a mental illness, requiring admission to a psychiatric hospital. While Romulus was unable to provide care for Raimond, Hora came to live with Raimond and cared for him.

To an immense degree, Romulus had recovered from his mental illness and saw Raimond live to adulthood. Romulus later suffered heart problems and eventually died of a heart attack.

== Themes ==
The story of Romulus, My Father details the struggle of many immigrants during and after the Second World War, and how these adversities were faced and sometimes overcome.

It portrays the never dwindling love of Romulus for his son Raimond, in spite of the challenges of being abandoned by his wife and the confusion caused by his mental illness.

The major literary themes displayed in relation to belonging are that of:

- belonging to family;
- belonging to a place;
- belonging to a culture; and
- the effect of mental illness.

== Awards and recognition ==
The book was the recipient of the 1998 Nettie Palmer Prize for Non-fiction.

It was chosen to be placed on both the Victorian Certificate of Education and New South Wales Higher School Certificate English reading lists, and was examined in both final English exams.

== Adaptions ==
A film adaptation, Romulus, My Father, was released in 2007, directed by Richard Roxburgh and starring Eric Bana, Franka Potente, and Kodi Smit-McPhee.
