= Conway Christ Redneck Superstar =

Satirical theatre production

Conway Christ Redneck Superstar: The greatest country'n'western story ever told is a satirical theatre production originally performed at La Boite Theatre's late night cabaret La Bamba on 13–16 November 1985. The production was directed by David Pyle and Sean Mee. The 1985 production featured 80 cast members and a 26-piece band. The season was booked out prior to opening night.

== History ==
Conway Christ Redneck Superstar was the second of six plays produced between 1985 and 1996 by a group of arts workers who formed a company called ToadShow Pty Ltd in 1986. All productions blended two well-known stories and interspersed the story with popular songs while satirising local politics and providing social comment.

ToadShow produced The Paisley Pirates of Penzance (1985), Conway Christ Redneck Superstar (1985) and Hound of Music (1986), SherWoodstock (1990), Phantoad of the Opera (1991) and Glamalot (1996). Theatre critic John Harris said, "The musicals are unique to Brisbane, conceived and written by a combination of talents undoubtedly unlike any to be found anywhere else in the world. They employ music with a rock beat, satire with a light touch, and casts of dozens, scores, or hundreds, depending upon the venue."

== Story ==
The story of Jesus Christ, Superstar is relocated to the Southern United States where downtrodden rural workers are exploited by the evil Boss Roman. The workers seek assistance from retired gunslinger Joe Christ whose son Conway goes to the rescue. The satire includes elements of classic country and western music and films particularly The Magnificent Seven and High Noon.

== Music ==
- Heaven Is My Woman's Love
- Working For The Man
- Wand'rin' Star
- Walk Tall
- If I Were A Carpenter
- Convoy
- Jesus Christ, Superstar
- Stand By Your Man
- These Boots Were Made For Walkin'
- Gethsemane
- Are You Lonesome Tonight?
- (The Man Who Shot) Liberty Valance
- Ring Of Fire
- I Remember You
- Here You Come Again

== Cast ==
- Conway Christ - Pat Leo
- Boss Roman - Paul Sugars
- Mary Lou Magdalene - Justine Anderson
- Judith Iscariot - Toni Mott
- Qantas Pilot - Barry Searle
- Mary Christ - Lisa Hickey
- Joseph Christ - Adam Couper
- Mayor - Maria Cleary
- Sheriff - Andrew Blackman
- Roman I - Stephen O'Keefe
- Roman II - Scott Witt
- Roman III - Lil Kelman
- Juan - Simon Stocks
- Doo - Tony Biggs
- Trey - Annie Henderson
- Peter Bob - Roger Rosser
- Luke - Katrina Devery

== Reception ==
Sue Gough in The Australian said it was "the cleverest and most energetic show I have seen all year."
