= Soft Fruit =

- Theatrical release poster
- Directed by: Christina Andreef
- Written by: Christina Andreef
- Produced by: Helen Bowden
- Starring: Jeanie Drynan; Russell Dykstra; Sacha Horler; Genevieve Lemon; Linal Haft
- Cinematography: Laszlo Baranyai
- Edited by: Jane Moran
- Music by: Antony Partos
- Distributed by: Fox Searchlight Pictures
- Release date: 28 October 1999
- Running time: 101 minutes
- Country: Australia
- Language: English
- Box office: A$598,704

Soft Fruit is a 1999 comedy drama film about a dying mother and her children who come together to fulfill her last wishes. It is an Australian American co-production produced by New Zealand filmmaker Jane Campion and directed by Christina Andreef.

== Plot ==
Four adult children reconvene in the steel-town of Port Kembla when their mother Patsy becomes terminally ill. The family includes sisters Josie, Nadia, and Vera, lone son Bo, and father Vic. It is the first time in eight years that all of the family has been under the same roof. Josie, herself a mother, is coming from San Diego in the U.S., while ex-con Bo is coming from prison. Nadia is having an affair with her ex-husband, and Vera is the shy one of the family.

== Cast ==
- Jeanie Drynan as Patsy Haft
- Russell Dykstra as Bo
- Linal Haft as Vic
- Genevieve Lemon as Josie
- Sacha Horler as Nadia
- Alicia Talbot as Vera
- Pat Bishop as Nursing sister

== Production ==
On the themes of the film, Andreef said:

As you grow older, it's so difficult to stay in relationship with your adult brothers and sisters. When you get into your thirties and forties, paths are dividing. Soft Fruit is about that sibling struggle. You think you don't care when you have a fight and fall out. Someone is always on the outer. It's about that struggle to get back on the inner, on the inside.

== Box office ==
Soft Fruit grossed $598,704 at the box office in Australia.

== Critical reception ==
On Rotten Tomatoes, Soft Fruit has an approval rating of 64% based on 14 reviews. The site's consensus reads, "Critics say that while Soft Fruit might be difficult to watch -- dealing as it is with terminal illness -- it is an emotionally genuine, warm film. The ensemble cast are also praised for their excellent portrayals of a family."

A. O. Scott of The New York Times wrote, "Soft Fruit shares with Sweetie, Ms. Campion's 1989 study of domestic monstrosity, as well as with such provincial antipodal slice-of-life comic melodramas as Muriel's Wedding, a commitment to showing human beings as they are, which is often highly unpleasant." He added, "The general talent and dedication of the ensemble mitigate the script's occasional lapses into sentimentality and noisy confrontation…Soft Fruit belongs, however, to the divine Ms. Drynan, who plays a dying, unfulfilled, ordinary woman without embellishment or overstatement but with mischievous reserve and surprising sensuality. Patsy is simultaneously dying and coming alive for the first time."

== Awards and nominations ==
Australian Film Institute Awards 1999

- Australian Film Institute Award for Best Actor - Russell Dykstra (winner)
- Australian Film Institute Award for Best Supporting Actress - Sacha Horler (winner)
- Australian Film Institute Award for Best Film (nominated)
- Australian Film Institute Award for Best Actress - Jeanie Drynan (nominated)
- Australian Film Institute Award for Best Director - Christina Andreef (nominated)
- Australian Film Institute Award for Best Screenplay - Christina Andreef (nominated)
- Australian Film Institute Award for Best Original Music Score – Antony Partos (nominated)

ARIA Music Award

- Best Original Soundtrack Album (nominated)

== See also ==
- Cinema of Australia
