= SherWoodstock =

Satirical theatre production

SherWoodstock: The Real Legend of Rockin' Robin Hood is a satirical theatre production originally performed at the Lyric Theatre in Brisbane on 12-25 January 1990. 18,000 people attended the production which raised $100,000 for the Queensland Spastic Welfare League. The executive producer and music director was David Pyle and the director was Sean Mee. The production featured more than 200 performers on stage and a 20-piece rock band. SherWoodstock was "described as a cross between The Secret Policeman's Ball, a Live Aid concert and Black Adder.

== History ==
SherWoodstock was the fourth of six plays produced by ToadShow Pty Ltd between 1985 and 1996. All productions blended two well-known stories and interspersed the story with popular songs while satirising local politics and providing social comment. SherWoodstock took elements from the legend of Robin Hood and the 1969 Woodstock music festival while drawing attention to environmental issues.

ToadShow had produced three smaller-scale musicals prior to SherWoodstock – The Paisley Pirates of Penzance (1985), Conway Christ Redneck Superstar (1985) and Hound of Music (1986). SherWoodstock was followed by Phantoad of the Opera (1991) and Glamalot (1996). Theatre critic John Harris said, "The musicals are unique to Brisbane, conceived and written by a combination of talents undoubtedly unlike any to be found anywhere else in the world. They employ music with a rock beat, satire with a light touch, and casts of dozens, scores, or hundreds, depending upon the venue."

The production of SherWoodstock was underwritten by Jarden Morgan, one of the original backers of the film Crocodile Dundee. It relied on sponsorship of more than 100 organisations. Executive producer David Pyle said, "The project relies on enthusiasm and goodwill from all involved. What we are basically doing is putting on a $3.5 million show for about a tenth of that price…"

== Synopsis ==
=== ACT 1 ===
Robin Hood returns from the crusades to learn that Sherwood Forest is threatened by a proposed real-estate development. At the castle Sir Guy of Brisbourne and his backer Prince John are pitching the Sherwood Cove real-estate development to his filthy rich friends. Robin crashes the event to announce he will dedicate his life to saving the forest. Here he meets Maid Marian, Prince John's public relations consultant. Robin returns to the forest where he forms a band of hippie supporters. Sir Guy, the Sheriff and Maid Marian go to Sherwood Forest to confront Robin. Sir Guy and the Sheriff are driven off by the hippies but Marian stays behind to go for a walk in the forest with Robin. Sir Guy is concerned the Sherwood Cove project is losing public support. To restore public support and neutralise Robin, Sir Guy decides to put on a rock concert called SherWoodstock. The rich and poor alike attend the rock concert where Robin takes the stage and implores everyone to unite to save the planet.

=== ACT 2 ===
Robin Hood has been captured at SherWoodstock and placed in shackles in the Dungeon Room cabaret where the rich are entertained by cabaret singer Will Scarlet. The Sheriff and Sir Guy gloat about capturing Robin. Sir Guy pulls out a crossbow and threatens to shoot Robin. In the ensuing chaos, Marian unshackles Robin which allows him to escape. Marian and several others are captured. Back in Sherwood Forest, Robin gets news that Marian has been captured. He is torn between saving the forest or saving Maid Marian. Meantime, Will Scarlet frees Marian. At SherWoodstock Robin and the hippies arrive to stage a protest to save the forest. There Robin is reunited with Marian. Sir Guy and Prince John have decided to bulldoze the forest. Robin, Marian and the hippies seize the castle to stop the bulldozers. Their victory is short-lived when King Richard arrives to evict the rich, the poor and the hippies. All the players are soon reunited in death after the plague strikes. In heaven they continue their squabbles on the golf course.

== Music ==
- American Pie
- I-Feel-Like-I'm-Fixin'-To-Die-Rag
- I Feel The Earth Move
- Hip to be Square
- Downtown
- Big Yellow Taxi
- Gimme Some Lovin'
- Piece of my Heart
- The Look of Love
- Evil Ways
- Scarborough Fair
- Each Tiny Tree
- Good Vibrations
- It's Not Unusual
- Ciao, Baby
- Moondance
- A Day in the Life
- We Gotta Get Out of This Place
- (You Make Me Feel Like) A Natural Woman
- You Are So Beautiful
- All Along The Watchtower
- Think

== Cast ==
- Robin Hood - David Brown
- Maid Marian - Justine Anderson
- Sir Guy of Brisbourne - Pat Leo
- The Sheriff - Paul Sugars
- Prince John - Toni Mott
- Much - Donald MacKee
- Bess - Karen Anderson
- Mother Hood - Sally McKenzie
- Friar Tuck - Brian Cavanagh
- Little John - Simon Monsour
- Will Scarlet - Simon Houghton
- King Richard - Paul Dellit

== Reception ==
David Bentley said "SherWoodstock … is a powerful show – bigger than big and spiced with some very funny gags. Last time I saw so many people in one spot was during peak hour on a London subway." "What do you get when you combine the music of Jimi Hendrix, Aretha Franklin and The Beatles? A damn good show, that's what!" said Liz Smith in The Albert and Logan News. Writing in The Sunday Mail Ronnie Gibson said the show was high on energy but the message about saving the forest was lost in sight gags and dancing. Peta Koch in The Courier-Mail said SherWoodstock was one of the first greenie musicals to emerge and praised the top-class musicians. Tracey Pollock in the Sunday Sun called SherWoodstock "energetic, dynamic and spectacular" although she criticised the production as slow to get started. Time Off's Mary Nemeth said, "… offers the biggest yet niftiest example of fine (totally live) musicianship allied to current music technology you're likely to hear in Brisbane – Australia? the world? – for many a year."

== Television broadcast ==
The theatre production of SherWoodstock was filmed by Channel 7 Brisbane and broadcast on 26 November 1990. The television broadcast was introduced by Queensland Premier Wayne Goss who was reported to have been bopping in his seat during the theatrical performance.

== Other productions ==
SherWoodstock was performed at high schools including:

Pine Rivers State High School (1992)

Hillbrook Anglican School (1995)

Downlands College (2005)

Cavendish Road State High School (2015)
