= Stories for Chip =

Festschrift collection edited by Nisi Shawl and Bill Campbell, fiction/essays, 2015

Stories for Chip: A Tribute to Samuel R. Delany
- Editor: Nisi Shawl and Bill Campbell
- Language: English
- Subject: festschrift
- Genre: speculative fiction, literary fiction, postmodern lit, essays
- Publisher: Ingram distribution
- Publication date: August 3, 2015 (U.S.)
- Publication place: United States
- Media type: Print (hardback & paperback)
- Pages: 380
- ISBN: 9780990319177
- OCLC: 893709976

Stories for Chip: A Tribute to Samuel R. Delany (2015) is a collection of 33 pieces of short fiction, essays, and creative non-fiction by a group of global writers in honor of author Samuel R. "Chip" Delany, coinciding with his retirement from his career of university teaching.

== Development and inspiration ==
The collection is compiled and edited by SF and fantastic fiction writer Nisi Shawl, and published by author and Rosarium Publishing founder, Bill Campbell. Publication was the result of crowdfunding and donations coordinated at Wiscon's (SF)³ website and Indiegogo.

== Content ==
The book includes:

1. "Introduction (Stories for Chip)", essay by Stanley Robinson
2. "Michael Swanwick and Samuel R. Delany at the Joyce Kilmer Service Area" (2007) a short story by Eileen Gunn
3. "Billy Tumult", short story by Nick Harkaway
4. "Voice Prints", short story by Devorah Major
5. "Delany Encounters: or, Another Reason Why I Study Race and Racism in Science Fiction", essay by Isiah Lavender, III of Extrapolation
6. "Clarity", short story by Anil Menon
7. "When Two Swordsmen Meet", short story by Ellen Kushner
8. "For Sale: Fantasy Coffins (Ababuo Need Not Apply)", short story by Chesya Burke
9. "Holding Hands with Monsters", short story by Haralambi Markov
10. "Song for the Asking", short story by Carmelo Rafalà
11. "Kickenders", short story by Kit Reed
12. "Walking Science Fiction: Samuel Delany and Visionary Fiction", essay by Walidah Imarisha
13. "Heart of Brass", short fiction by poet Alex Jennings
14. "Empathy Evolving As a Quantum of Eight-Dimensional Perception", 2013 short story by Claude Lalumière
15. "Be Three", short story by Jewelle Gomez
16. "Guerrilla Mural of a Siren's Song", 1989 short story by Ernest Hogan
17. "An Idyll in Erewhyna", short story by Hal Duncan
18. "Real Mothers, a Faggot Uncle, and the Name of the Father: Samuel R. Delany's Feminist Revisions of the Story of SF", essay by L. Timmel Duchamp
19. "Nilda ", short story by Junot Díaz
20. "The First Gate of Logic", short story by Benjamin Rosenbaum
21. "The Master of the Milford Altarpiece", 1968 short story by Thomas M. Disch
22. "River, Clap Your Hands ", short story by Sheree Renée Thomas
23. "Haunt-Type Experience", 2009 short story by Roz Clarke
24. "Eleven Stations", short story by Fábio Fernandes
25. "Légendaire", 2013 novelette by Kai Ashante Wilson
26. "On My First Reading of The Einstein Intersection", essay by Michael Swanwick
27. "Characters in the Margins of a Lost Notebook", short story by Kathryn Cramer
28. "Hamlet's Ghost Sighted in Frontenac, KS", short story by Vincent Czyz
29. "Each Star a Sun to Invisible Plane", short story by Tenea D. Johnson
30. "Clones", short story by Alex Smith (II)
31. "The Last Dying Man", short story by Geetanjali Dighe
32. "Capitalism in the 22nd Century or A.I.r.", short story by Geoff Ryman
33. "Jamaica Ginger", novelette by Nalo Hopkinson and Nisi Shawl
34. "Festival", novelette by Chris Nakashima-Brown as by Christopher Brown (I)

== See also ==
- Dark Matter anthology
- List of festschrifts
