= Alan Grafen =

Scottish ethologist and evolutionary biologist

- Born: Dollar, Clackmannanshire
- Citizenship: United Kingdom
- Scientific career
- Fields: Ethology, Evolutionary biology
- Institutions: University of Oxford
- Thesis: The economics of evolutionary stability (1984)
- Doctoral advisor: Richard Dawkins
- Doctoral students: Laurence Hurst; Yan Wong
- Website: users.ox.ac.uk/~grafen/

Alan Grafen FRS is a Scottish ethologist and evolutionary biologist. He currently teaches and undertakes research at St John's College, Oxford. Along with regular contributions to scientific journals, Grafen is known publicly for his work as co-editor (with Mark Ridley) of the 2006 festschrift Richard Dawkins: How a Scientist Changed the Way We Think, honouring the achievements of his colleague and former academic advisor. He has worked extensively in the field of biological game theory, and, in 1990, devised a model showing that Zahavi's well-known handicap principle could theoretically exist in natural populations.

He also published a seminal paper in the field of phylogenetic comparative methods, in which he demonstrated how the tools of generalised least squares could be applied to perform phylogenetically informed statistical analyses.

Grafen was elected a Fellow of the Royal Society in 2011.

== Bibliography ==
- Hails, Rosemary; Grafen, Alan (2002). Modern statistics for the life sciences. Oxford [Oxfordshire]: Oxford University Press. ISBN 0-19-925231-9.
