= The Paisley Pirates of Penzance =

Satirical theatre production

The Paisley Pirates of Penzance is a satirical adaptation of Gilbert and Sullivan's comic opera The Pirates of Penzance. The satire was first performed in Australia at Brisbane's La Boite Theatre's late night cabaret La Bamba on 8–10 February 1985. It was directed by David Pyle and Sean Mee. The production coincided with a revival of Gilbert and Sullivan's The Pirates of Penzance that opened the Queensland Performing Arts Centre's Lyric Theatre season on 7 February 1985.

== History ==
The Paisley Pirates of Penzance was the first of six plays produced in Brisbane between 1985 and 1996 by a group of arts workers who formed a company called ToadShow Pty Ltd in 1986. All their productions blended two well-known stories and interspersed the story with popular songs while satirising local politics and providing social comment. In The Paisley Pirates of Penzance, the role of the Major-General was played by comedian Gerry Connolly impersonating Queensland Premier Joh Bjelke-Petersen. Connolly was known for impersonating Bjelke-Petersen and other public figures such as Queen Elizabeth II.

ToadShow produced The Paisley Pirates of Penzance (1985), Conway Christ Redneck Superstar (1985), Hound of Music (1986), SherWoodstock (1990), Phantoad of the Opera (1991) and Glamalot (1996). Theatre critic John Harris said, "The musicals are unique to Brisbane. ... They employ music with a rock beat, satire with a light touch, and casts of dozens, scores, or hundreds, depending upon the venue."

The production of The Paisley Pirates of Penzance was originally intended to last two performances, but ticket buyers queued around the block. A third performance in the early hours of 10 February was staged for patrons who had failed to obtain tickets, and for the cast and crew of The Pirates of Penzance who had heard of the production through word of mouth.

== Synopsis ==
=== Act 1 ===
Apprentice pirate Frederic is about to graduate but his heart is not in the job. His guardian Ruth has romantic designs on Frederic, but he has never seen another woman. He resolves to venture into the world to seek experience. Frederic meets the Major-General's daughters, and he is captivated by the enchanting Mabel. He tells the girls to be wary as there are pirates about. Despite the warning the pirates soon have the girls in their evil clutches and are entertaining matrimonial ambitions. The Major-General arrives to rescue his family.

=== Act 2 ===
Tearing himself away from Mabel, Frederic decides he must stop the pirates with the aid of the police. Just as he is about to set out on the mission, Frederic discovers he is still technically a pirate. Frederic is torn between his love for Mabel and his contractual fealty to the pirates. He rejoins the pirates. The police are still determined to stop the pirates. Mass arrests are avoided when it is revealed that the pirates are actually peers of the realm. Everyone can now live together in peace and harmony.

== Cast ==
- Narrator – Leah Cotterell
- Mabel – Justine Anderson
- Frederic – Pat Leo
- Pirate King - Sean Mee
- Major-General – Gerry Connolly
- Constable – Brian Cavanagh
- Ruth – Karen Anderson

== Music ==
- Leader of the Pack
- Oh, is there not one maiden breast?
- Stay, we must not lose our senses
- Get a Job
- I Just Don't Know What to Do with Myself
- Tarantara
- Mrs. Brown, You've Got a Lovely Daughter
- You Don't Have to Say You Love Me
- Have I the Right?
- Lazy Sunday Afternoon

== Reception ==
Writing in Time Off, Gavin Sawford said, "The Paisley Pirates of Penzance is a satirical reworking and updating of the Gilbert and Sullivan classic which proved a surprise hit of 1985." Sue Gough in The Australian said Paisley Pirates was hilarious.
