= Babyteeth (play) =

2012 play by Rita Kalnejais

- Author: Rita Kalnejais
- Language: English
- Genre: Play
- Publisher: Currency Press
- Publication date: 2012
- Publication place: Australia
- Media type: Print (paperback)
- ISBN: 978-0-86819-926-9

Babyteeth is a 2012 play by the Australian playwright Rita Kalnejais. Richard Roxburgh announced that he was planning to direct a film version in 2015.

== First production ==
Babyteeth was first produced by Belvoir at Belvoir St Theatre, Sydney, on 15 February 2012, with the following cast:

- Toby – Kathryn Beck
- Anna – Helen Buday
- Thuong – David Carreon / Sean Chu
- Gidon – Russell Dykstra
- Moses – Eamon Farren
- Henry – Greg Stone
- Milla – Sara West
- Director: Eamon Flack
- Set designer: Robert Cousins
- Costume designer: Alice Babidge
- Lighting designer: Niklas Pajanti
- Composer: Alan John
- Sound designer: Steve Francis
- Assistant director: Kit Brookman
- Fight choreographer: Scott Witt
- Stage manager: Luke McGettigan
- Assistant stage manager: Liz Astey
