= Hillbrook Anglican School =

Hillbrook

Location
- Brisbane, Queensland; Australia; 27°24′57″S 152°59′21″E

Information
- Type: Independent, co-educational, secondary school
- Motto: In Balance We Grow
- Denomination: Anglican
- Established: 31 May 1986
- Staff: 139
- Enrollment: 895
- Colours: Blue, red, green, yellow

Hillbrook Anglican School is an independent, co-educational secondary school in Enoggera, a suburb of Brisbane, Australia.

== History ==
Hillbrook was founded on 31 May 1986. The school officially opened for the 1987 school year, providing three Year 8 classes in 1991. The school's original buildings were an orphanage before becoming a school. These buildings now house Science, Languages/Geography, Home Economics classrooms and computer labs. Each year level consists of four home classes, named by the colours red, white, blue and green.

The school's development has seen significant building activity, most significantly with the addition of a Performing Arts Complex in 2003(refurbished in 2014), in 2006 the Tree of Life Chapel (which coincided with the school's 20th anniversary) in 2009 a new library complex, in 2010 the Science classrooms were updated. 2014 sees significant building work continue with a new two-story building housing the Year 7 precinct and purpose-built Maths classrooms for Years 8 to 12. 2020 sees the completion of multiple projects including an extension to the library, general improvements to the central area and a new building that currently houses the science labs and cafeteria.

With the introduction of Year 7 in 2015, the school's student population grew to average approximately 720 students. Additional streams will see the school grow to a student population of just over 1000.

Hillbrook was started by a small group of people, including past headmaster Norm Hunter, and his original co-principal, John Lindsay. Father Clarrie White was also part of this foundation group, along with Julie Lindsay and Rae Hunter.

== Members of the Hillbrook Leadership Team ==
Hillbrook began with an unorthodox Co-Principal arrangement, with one Deputy Principal. In 1997, it transitioned to a new model, with one Principal and two Deputies.

- John Lindsay (Co-Principal 1987–1997)
- Norm Hunter (Co-Principal 1987–1997, Principal 1998–2007)
- Yvonne Hawke (Deputy Principal until 2006)
- Geoff Newton (Deputy Principal 1997–2007, Principal until 2022)
- Stephanie Munday-Lake (Deputy Principal 2007–2023)
- Jason Sharland (Deputy Principal 2008–2009, acting Deputy Principal 2024)
- Craig Merritt (Deputy Principal 2010–2016)
- Mark Herriman (Deputy Principal 2016~, acting Principal 2024)
- Maria Woods (Principal) 2023–2024
- Mark Zietsch (Principal) 2024–present

As of 2024, the Hillbrook School Leadership Team consists of the Principal, the Deputy Principal, the Business Manager, the Dean of Student Wellbeing and the Dean of Teaching and Learning.

== Curriculum ==
The school offers a curriculum based on the syllabi offered by the Queensland Curriculum and Assessment Authority (QCAA). It offers a small range of vocational education subjects. Subjects unique to the school include PSD (Personal and Spiritual Development)and Philosophical Inquiry.

The school has a significant Outdoor Education program, with students participating in a yearly camp and numerous activities throughout the year. These activities can include: Rock climbing, Abseiling, Canoeing, Surf safety, various forms of Orienteering and a comprehensive Ropes Course. The activities are challenging and designed to promote confidence, resilience and teamwork. The school competes in various team sports as well as district cross-country, regional sports, athletics and swimming for interested students.

== Co-curricular ==
Hillbrook offers a range of co-curricular activities. Typically these are offered in an arrangement known as 'Project Active' which emphasises fitness and the opportunity to engage in less mainstream activities. The school offers dramatic options in the form of biennial school musicals and more informally as part of a drama extension program. Productions have included Mary Poppins (musical) (2026), Strictly Ballroom (musical) (2024), Charlie and the Chocolate Factory (musical) (2022), Annie (2018), The Addams Family (2016), Beauty and the Beast (2014), The Boyfriend (2012), Little Shop of Horrors (2010), The Wizard of Oz (2008), Biloxi Blues (2007), The Drought (2007), Peter Pan (2007), Away (2006), forget.me.never.after (2006), Grease (2006), The Insect Play (2006), The Crucible (2005), Pirates of Penzance (2004), Anything Goes (2002) and Joseph and the Amazing Technicolor Dreamcoat (2000), The Mikado (1998), SherWoodstock (1995) and Bugsy Malone (1990). Other productions have included staff and past-students, including A Midsummer Night's Dream (2007), The Importance of Being Earnest (2005), Cosi (2004) and Love Letters (2003).

== Governance ==
Hillbrook is governed by a School Council, consisting of 11 members. Nine of these members are democratically elected, four from the parent body and five from the teaching staff. One representative is appointed by the Archbishop, and the Principal is an ex officio member.

The school emphasises a comparatively flat leadership structure, but responsibility for the school's day-to-day running rests with the School Leadership Team.

== See also ==
- List of schools in Queensland
- List of Anglican schools in Australia
