= Philosophy, Ethics, and a Common Humanity =

2011 book edited by Christopher Cordner

Philosophy, Ethics, and a Common Humanity: Essays in Honour of Raimond Gaita
- Author: Christopher Cordner
- Subject: ethics
- Published: 2011
- Publisher: Routledge
- Pages: 248 pp.
- ISBN: 9780415546386

Philosophy, Ethics, and a Common Humanity: Essays in Honour of Raimond Gaita is a 2011 book edited by Christopher Cordner, honoring the work of Raimond Gaita.

== Contributors ==
- Lars Hertzberg
- Stephen Mulhall
- Jonathan Glover
- Christopher Cordner
- Antony Duff
- Marina Barabas
- Avishai Margalit
- Martin Krygier
- Robert Manne
- M.M. McCabe
- Genevieve Lloyd
- Peter Coghlan
- Nick Drake
- Peter Steele
