= Fact and Value =

2001 book edited by Alex Byrne, Robert C. Stalnaker, Ralph Wedgwood

Fact and Value: Essays on Ethics and Metaphysics for Judith Jarvis Thomson
- Author: Alex Byrne, Robert C. Stalnaker, Ralph Wedgwood
- Subject: ethics
- Published: 2001
- Publisher: A Bradford Book
- Pages: 248 pp.
- ISBN: 978-0262525626

Fact and Value: Essays on Ethics and Metaphysics for Judith Jarvis Thomson is a 2001 book edited by Alex Byrne, Robert C. Stalnaker and Ralph Wedgwood in which the authors discuss moral and political issues, foundations of moral theory, metaphysics and epistemology. The book is dedicated to Judith Jarvis Thomson.

Philosopher Alan Soble, in a review of this Festschrift proposed 13 conditions that must be satisfied by any adequate Festschrift.
