= Romulus, My Father (film) =

2007 Australian film by Richard Roxburgh

- Theatrical release poster
- Directed by: Richard Roxburgh
- Screenplay by: Nick Drake
- Based on: Romulus, My Father by Raimond Gaita
- Produced by: Robert Connolly; John Maynard
- Starring: Eric Bana; Kodi Smit-McPhee; Franka Potente; Marton Csokas
- Cinematography: Geoffrey Simpson
- Edited by: Suresh Ayyar
- Music by: Basil Hogios
- Distributed by: Dendy Films
- Release date: 31 May 2007
- Running time: 104 minutes
- Country: Australia
- Language: English
- Box office: $2.5 million

Romulus, My Father is a 2007 Australian drama film directed by Richard Roxburgh. Based on the memoir of the same name by Raimond Gaita, the film tells the story of Romulus (Eric Bana) and his wife Christine (Franka Potente), and their struggle in the face of great adversity to raise their son, Raimond, played by the nine-year-old Kodi Smit-McPhee. The film marks the directorial debut for Australian actor Richard Roxburgh. It was commended in the Australian Film Critics Association 2007 Film Awards.

== Plot ==
The film tells the story of Romulus Gaita, a Yugoslavian immigrant to Australia after World War II and his struggle to bring up his son, Raimond, in an isolated shack in the Victorian bush. Raimond's mother has an undiagnosed mental illness and engages in promiscuous behaviour, before taking her own life, and Raimond has to deal with the deterioration of his father's mental health.

== Cast ==
- Eric Bana as Romulus Gaita, the father of Raimond.
- Kodi Smit-McPhee as Raimond Gaita, the son of Romulus and Christine.
- Franka Potente as Christine Gaita, the mother of Raimond and the wife of Romulus.
- Marton Csokas as Hora, friend of Romulus, and temporary father figure for Raimond while his father is in a psychiatric hospital.
- Russell Dykstra as Mitru
- Jacek Koman as Vacek
- Alethea McGrath as Mrs Lillie
- Terry Norris as Tom Lillie
- Esme Melville as Miss Collard
- Heather Mitchell as Television Presenter

== Production ==
Roxburgh wanted to make a film straight after reading the book, Romulus, My Father, given to him by his sister. However, there were seven years between his first meeting with Gaita and the film's release. Gaita fielded several offers soon after the publication of the book, but turned them down "because it's very hard to make a film about people with mental illness without being kitschy or in some way offensive". Although Gaita warmed to Roxburgh after meeting him in London, it was not until Roxburgh had secured Robert Connolly and John Maynard as producers that Gaita felt that he could trust the three of them to make a good film. Roxburgh later described making the film as "absolutely terrifying", because he didn't want to mess it up. Gaita said finding nine-year-old Kodi Smit-McPhee to play the young Raimond was a turning point because he "miraculously captured exactly as I felt".

== Locations ==
In an article with The Guardian, the director, Richard Roxburgh, said that they'd shot the film on location, "Very close to where Rai’s house once stood" in Frogmore, NSW.

- Ballarat, Victoria
- Bendigo, Victoria
- Carisbrook, Victoria
- Castlemaine, Victoria
- Maldon, Victoria
- Maryborough, Victoria

== Soundtrack ==
- "Real Wild Child" (Johnny O'Keefe, Dave Owens, John Greenan) — Jerry Lee Lewis
- "My Prayer" — The Platters

== Awards ==
- Winner, Golden Tripod Award, Australian Cinematographers Society — 2007
- Winner, AFI Award for Best Film, Best Lead Actor (Eric Bana), Best Supporting Actor (Marton Csokas), and Young Actor's Award (Kodi Smit-McPhee) – 2007
- Nominated, AFI Award for Best Cinematography (Geoffrey Simpson), Best Costume Design, Best Direction, Best Editing, Best Lead Actor (Kodi Smit-McPhee), Best Lead Actress (Franka Potente), Best Original Music Score, Best Production Design, Best Screenplay, Best Sound, Best Supporting Actor (Russell Dykstra), Best Supporting Actress (Esme Melville) – 2007
- Winner, Australian Screen Sound Guild Award for Best Achievement in Sound for Film Sound Recording — 2007
- Nominated Australian Screen Sound Guild Award for Best Achievement in Sound for Film Sound Design, Best Achievement in Sound for Film Sound Mixing, Feature Film Soundtrack of the Year — 2007
- Winner, FCCA Award for Best Actor in Supporting Role [Marton Csokas) – 2008
- Winner, Special Achievement Award, FCAA to Kodi Smit-McPhee — 2008
- Nominated, FCAA Award for Best Actor (Eric Bana), Best Actor in Supporting Role (Kodi Smit-McPhee), Best Cinematography, Best Director, Best Editing, Best Film, Best Music Score — 2008
- Nominated, Young Artist Awards, Best Performance in an International Feature Film (Kodi Smit-McPhee)

== Box office ==
Romulus, My Father grossed $2,589,674 at the box office in Australia.
