= Puppet on a String =

Puppet on a String may refer to:

- Puppet on a String (album), by Sandie Shaw, 1967
  - "Puppet on a String" (Sandie Shaw song)
- "Puppet on a String" (Elvis Presley song), 1965
- "Puppet on a String" (Jo Jo Zep & the Falcons song), 1980
