= Mark Ridley (zoologist) =

British zoologist and writer

- Born: 1956 (age 69–70); England
- Scientific career
- Fields: Zoology, Evolutionary biology
- Workplaces: University of Oxford
- Thesis: The comparative economics of reproductive behaviour (1982)
- Doctoral advisor: Richard Dawkins

Mark Ridley (born 1956) is a British zoologist and writer on evolution.

He studied at both Oxford and Cambridge in the 1980s (his doctoral advisor being Richard Dawkins), and later worked at Emory University. As of 2010 he worked as a research assistant at the Department of Zoology, Oxford University. Ridley has worked on the evolution of reproductive behaviour and written a number of popular accounts of evolutionary biology, including articles for the New York Times, The Sunday Times, Nature, New Scientist and The Times Literary Supplement. He is sometimes confused with Matt Ridley, another writer on evolution who is also from the UK.

== Published works ==
- Ridley, Mark 1993. Evolution Blackwell; 2nd ed 1996 Blackwell ISBN 0-86542-495-0; 3rd ed 2003 Wiley ISBN 978-1-4051-0345-9. A comprehensive textbook: case studies, commentary, dedicated website and CD.
- Mendel's Demon: Gene Justice and the Complexity of Life 2001 ISBN 978-0-7538-1410-9
  - Released in the US with the title: The Cooperative Gene: How Mendel's Demon Explains the Evolution of Complex Beings 2001 ISBN 978-0-7432-0161-2
- Animal Behavior: An Introduction to Behavioral Mechanisms, Development, and Ecology 1995 ISBN 978-0-632-01416-3
- The Problems of Evolution 1985 ISBN 978-0-19-219194-6
- The Darwin Reader (Second Edition) 1996 ISBN 978-0-393-96967-2
- How to Read Darwin 2006 ISBN 978-0-393-32881-3
- Evolution and classification: The reformation of cladism 1986 ISBN 978-0-582-44497-3
- Narrow Roads of Geneland (with W. D. Hamilton) 2006 ISBN 978-0-19-856690-8
- The Explanation of Organic Diversity: The Comparative Method and Adaptations for Mating 1983 ISBN 978-0-19-857597-9
- Oxford Surveys in Evolutionary Biology: 1985 (with Richard Dawkins) Vol. 2 1986 ISBN 978-0-19-854174-5, Vol. 3 1987 ISBN 978-0-19-854199-8
- Animal Behaviour: A Concise Introduction 1995 ISBN 978-0-86542-390-9
- Richard Dawkins: How a Scientist Changed the Way We Think (editor, with Alan Grafen) 2007 ISBN 978-0-19-921466-2
