= Kodi Smit-McPhee =

Australian actor (born 1996)

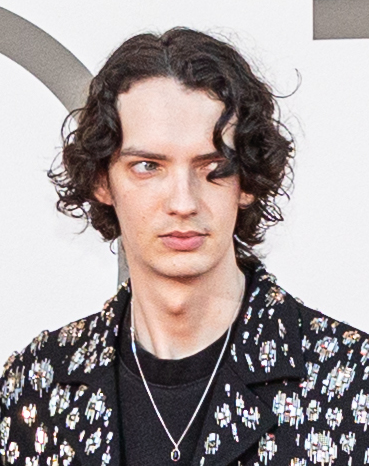
- Smit-McPhee in 2024
- Born: 13 June 1996 (age 30); Adelaide, South Australia
- Occupation: Actor
- Years active: 2005–present
- Relatives: Sianoa Smit-McPhee (sister)
- Awards: Full list

Kodi Smit-McPhee (born 13 June 1996) is an Australian actor. He gained recognition as a child actor for his leading roles in The Road (2009) and Let Me In (2010). He provided the voice of Norman Babcock in ParaNorman (2012) and Gilbert Pudel in Memoir of a Snail (2024), and appeared in Dawn of the Planet of the Apes (2014), Slow West (2015), Alpha (2018), and played Nightcrawler in X-Men: Apocalypse (2016) and Dark Phoenix (2019).

In 2021, Smit-McPhee garnered critical acclaim for playing a troubled teenager in Jane Campion's western film The Power of the Dog. He received various accolades for his performance, including a Golden Globe Award and a nomination for the Academy Award for Best Supporting Actor. He has since featured in the thriller miniseries Disclaimer and the biographical drama Maria (both 2024).

== Early life ==
Smit-McPhee was born on 13 June 1996 in Adelaide, South Australia, the son of Sonja Smit and Andy McPhee. His father is an actor and former professional wrestler. His older sister is actress and singer Sianoa Smit-McPhee.

At age 16, Smit-McPhee was diagnosed with ankylosing spondylitis, a degenerative form of arthritis which causes vertebrae in the spine to fuse and can lead to chronic pain and loss of vision. While filming The Power of the Dog, his vision was impaired in his left eye due to a severe cataract related to his condition.

== Career ==
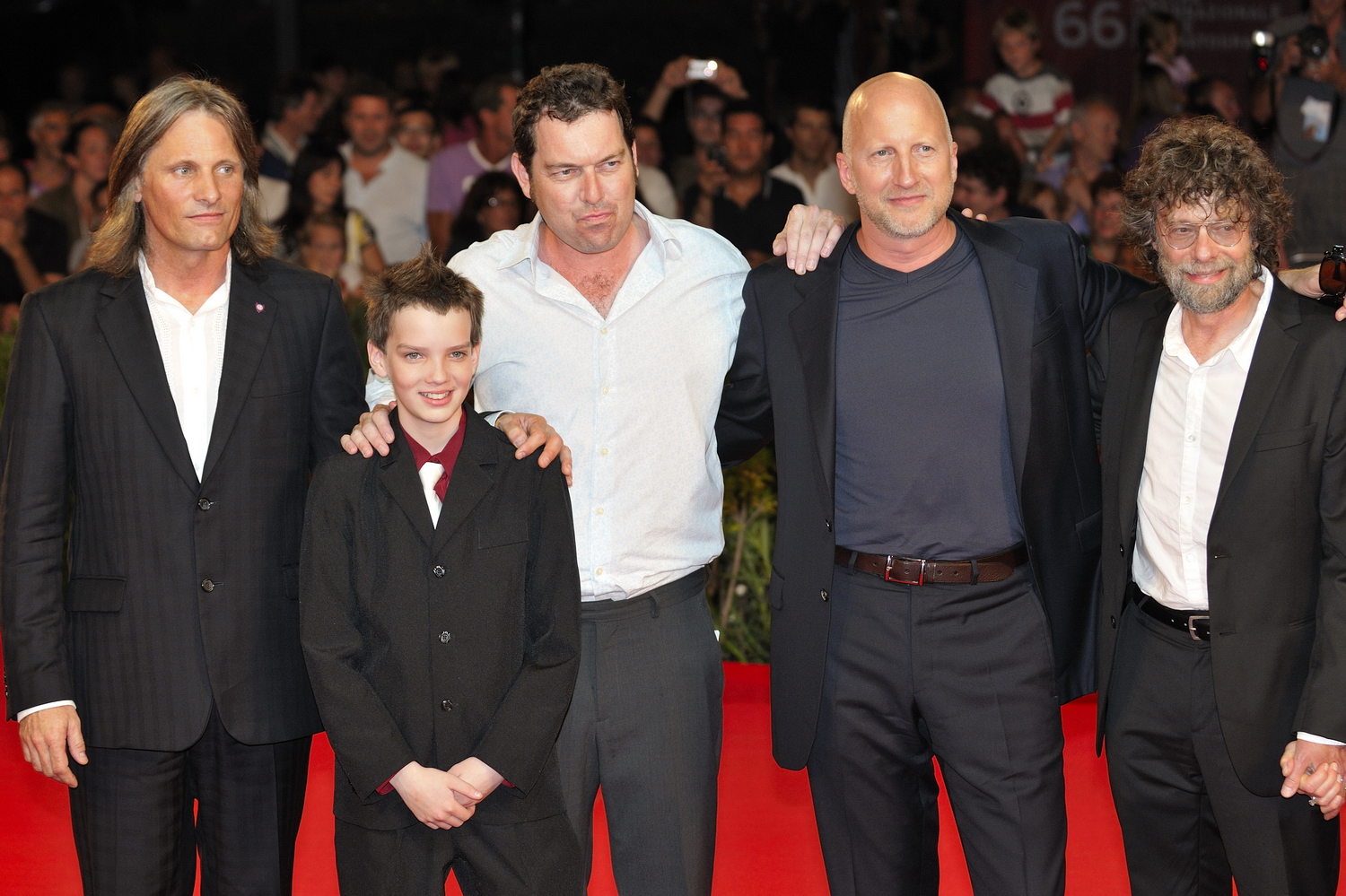
Viggo Mortensen, Smit-McPhee, Joe Penhall, John Hillcoat, and Steve Schwartz at the 2009 premiere of The Road at the 66th Venice International Film Festival.

Smit-McPhee's first feature film role was in Romulus, My Father, which garnered him the 2007 AFI Award for Best Young Actor as well as a Best Actor nomination. For his appearance in The Road (2009), he received a Critics' Choice Award nomination for Best Young Actor and a 2010 Australian Film Institute (AFI) nomination for Best International Actor. The following year, he starred in Let Me In, for which he received a 2010 Critics Choice Award nomination for Best Young Actor for his performance in the film.

Smit-McPhee then voiced the lead role of Norman in ParaNorman, a 2012 animated comedy horror film which was nominated for Best Animated Feature for the 2013 Academy Awards, and also received a 2013 BAFTA Award nomination for Best Animated Film. Later the same year, Smit-McPhee had a role in Dead Europe, which premiered at the 2012 Toronto International Film Festival. His next role came in The Wilderness of James in the title role of James. He also starred in A Birder's Guide to Everything, which premiered at the 2013 Tribeca Film Festival, and played Benvolio in a film adaptation of Romeo and Juliet. He co-starred in the 20th Century Fox film Dawn of the Planet of the Apes (2014).

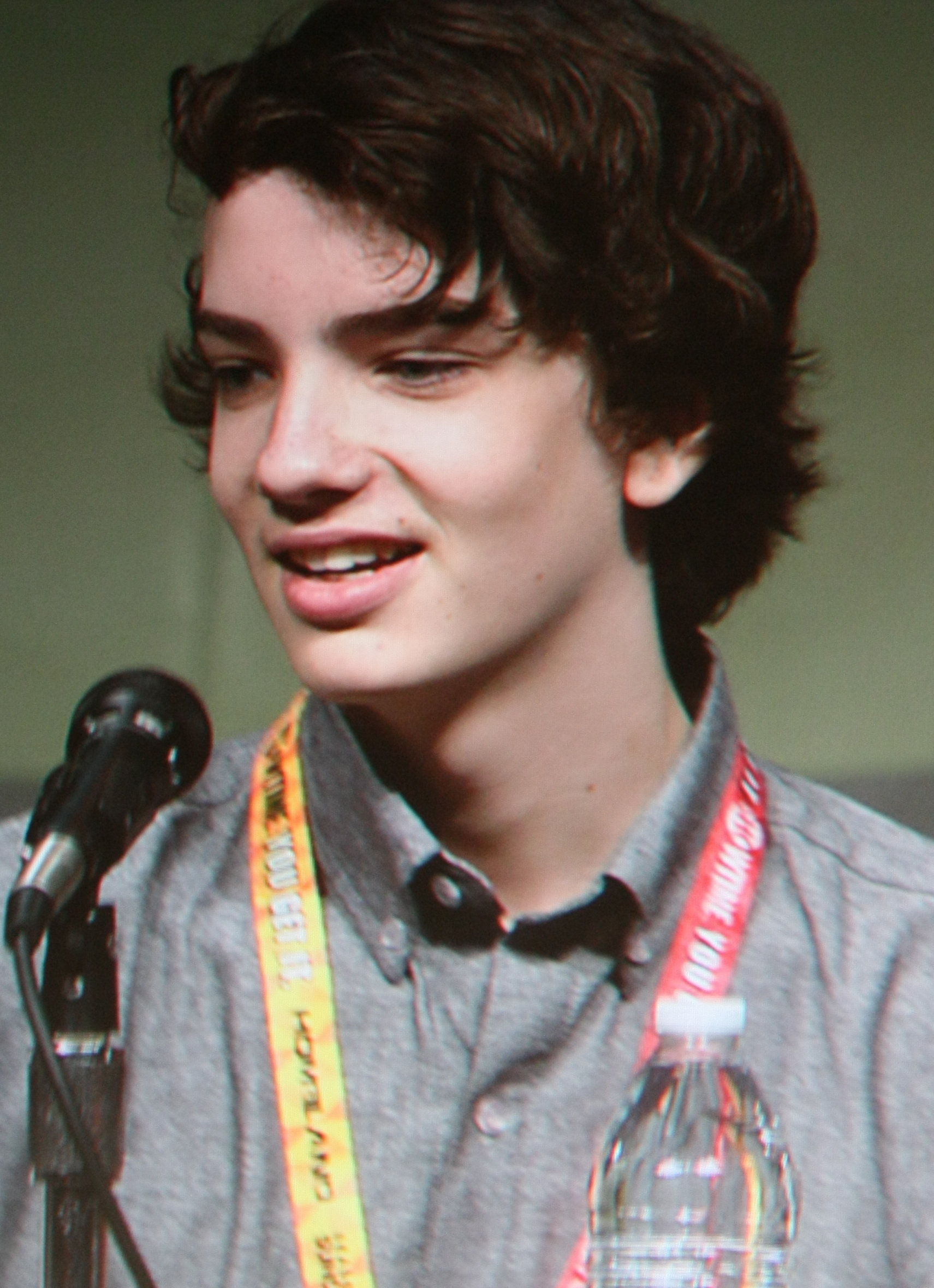
Smit-McPhee at the 2012 San Diego Comic-Con

In 2013, Smit-McPhee filmed the action science fiction film Young Ones. The film premiered at the Sundance Film Festival in January 2014. Soon afterwards he appeared in Slow West, which was released in 2015.

In March 2014, he was cast in the Nine Network's seven-part drama series Gallipoli which was broadcast in February and March 2015, the year that marks the 100th anniversary of the Gallipoli landing. He plays 17-year-old Thomas "Tolly" Johnson, who pretends to be older so that he can enlist with his brother Bevan and ends up fighting at Gallipoli in the campaign that helped create the Anzac legend. Aged 17 when he undertook the role, Smit-McPhee said afterwards that it showed "that soldiers aren't the patriotic brave souls they look like, it's showing them at their most vulnerable in tragic times and when they are terrified".

Smit-McPhee played Nightcrawler in X-Men: Apocalypse (2016), a character whose older version was previously played by Alan Cumming. Smit-McPhee reprised the role in Dark Phoenix, which was released in 2019.

In 2018, he played the central character Keda, an Ice Age adolescent who tames a wolf, in Alpha.

In 2021, Smit-McPhee starred in Jane Campion's film The Power of the Dog. The film premiered at the 78th Venice International Film Festival, where it opened to critical acclaim. Smit-McPhee's performance in particular received praise, with Carlos Aguilar of TheWrap calling him "terrifyingly remarkable" and Peter Bradshaw of The Guardian writing, "Smit-McPhee brings something inscrutably complex and reserved to his character's behaviour". In March 2022, Smit-McPhee joined Alfonso Cuarón's Apple+ series Disclaimer.

In 2024, he voiced the character of Gilbert, brother to main character Grace Pudel, in the adult animated film Memoir of a Snail.

In 2025, Smit-McPhee made his London stage debut as Konstantin Treplev in Thomas Ostermeier's production of The Seagull at the Barbican Theatre.

== Acting credits ==
=== Film ===
Key
†	Denotes films that have not yet been released

Kodi Smit-McPhee's film appearances
Year	Title	Role	Notes
2007	Romulus, My Father	Raimond	
2009	The Road	Boy	
2009	Tinytown	Davis	
2010	Let Me In	Owen	
2010	Matching Jack	Finn	
2012	Dead Europe	Josef	
2012	ParaNorman	Norman Babcock (voice)	
2013	A Birder's Guide to Everything	David Portnoy	
2013	The Congress	Aaron Wright	
2013	Romeo & Juliet	Benvolio Montague	
2014	All the Wilderness	James Charm	
2014	Dawn of the Planet of the Apes	Alexander	
2014	Maya the Bee	Willy (voice)	
2014	Young Ones	Jerome Holm	
2015	Slow West	Jay Cavendish	
2016	X-Men: Apocalypse	Kurt Wagner / Nightcrawler	
2018	Deadpool 2	Kurt Wagner / Nightcrawler	Cameo
2018	Alpha	Keda	
2019	Dark Phoenix	Kurt Wagner / Nightcrawler	
2019	Dolemite Is My Name	Nicholas Josef von Sternberg	
2020	2067	Ethan Whyte	
2021	The Power of the Dog	Peter Gordon	
2022	Elvis	Jimmie Rodgers Snow	
2024	Memoir of a Snail	Gilbert Pudel (voice)	
2024	Maria	Mandrax	
2026	The Passenger	Lloyd	
2026	Confession		
TBA	Untitled Mike Thornton biopic film †	TBA	Filming
TBA	Black Palace †	TBA	Post-production

=== Television ===
Year	Title	Role	Notes
2006	Monarch Cove	Young Jake	4 episodes
2006	Nightmares and Dreamscapes: From the Stories of Stephen King	Brandon	Episode: "Umney's Last Case"
2006	Nightmares and Dreamscapes: From the Stories of Stephen King	Jackson Evans	Episode: "The Fifth Quarter"
2006	Fatal Contact: Bird Flu in America	Toby Connelly	Television film
2007	The King	Young John Wesley	Television film
2011–2016	Poppy Cat	Ravi (voice)	
2015	Gallipoli	Thomas "Tolly" Johnson	Miniseries
2020	Interrogation	Chris Keller	Main role
2024	Disclaimer	Nicholas Ravenscroft	Miniseries

=== Theatre ===
Year	Title	Role	Venue(s)	Ref.
2025	The Seagull	Konstantin Treplev	Barbican Theatre, London	

== Awards and nominations ==
Smit-McPhee received many youth awards for his performances in films Romulus, My Father (2007), The Road (2009) and Let Me In (2010).

His critically acclaimed performance in The Power of the Dog (2021) earned him a Golden Globe Award for Best Supporting Actor, in addition to nominations for the Academy Award, Actor Award, BAFTA Award, and Critics' Choice Movie Award in the same category.

== See also ==
- List of Academy Award winners and nominees from Australia
