= Christopher Cordner =

Australian philosopher

- Born: 30 December 1949 (age 76)
- Awards: Rhodes Scholarship (1972)

Education
- Education: University of Oxford (PhD)

Philosophical work
- Era: 21st-century philosophy
- Region: Western philosophy
- School: Analytic
- Institutions: University of Melbourne
- Main interests: ethics

Christopher Donald Cordner (born 30 December 1949) is an Australian philosopher and associate professor of Philosophy at the University of Melbourne. He is known for his expertise on ethics. Cordner is a recipient of the Rhodes Scholarship (1972).

== Books ==
- Ethical Encounter: The Depth of Moral Meaning (Swansea Studies in Philosophy), Palgrave Macmillan UK, 2001, ISBN 9780333786369
- Philosophy, Ethics, and a Common Humanity: Essays in Honour of Raimond Gaita (ed.), Routledge, 2011, ISBN 9780415546386
