= David Haig (biologist) =

Australian biologist

David Addison Haig (born 28 June 1958) is an Australian evolutionary biologist, geneticist, and professor in Harvard University's Department of Organismic and Evolutionary Biology. He is interested in intragenomic conflict, genomic imprinting, and parent–offspring conflict, and he wrote the book Genomic Imprinting and Kinship. His major contribution to the field of evolutionary theory is the kinship theory of genomic imprinting.

The foreword of his 2020 book From Darwin to Derrida: Selfish Genes, Social Selves, and the Meanings of Life was written by Dan Dennett.

Haig was appointed an Officer of the Order of Australia in the 2026 King's Birthday Honours in recognition of "distinguished service to international academic relations, to tertiary education, and to organismic and evolutionary biology".

== Significant papers ==
- Haig, D. (1993). Genetic conflicts in human pregnancy. Quarterly Review of Biology, 68, 495-532.
- Haig, D. (1997). The social gene. In Krebs, J. R. & Davies, N. B. (editors) Behavioural Ecology: an Evolutionary Approach, pp. 284-304. Blackwell Publishers, London.
- Haig, D. (2000). The kinship theory of genomic imprinting. Annual Review of Ecology and Systematics, 31, 9-32.
- Wilkins, J. F. & Haig, D. (2003) .What good is genomic imprinting: the function of parent-specific gene expression. Nature Reviews Genetics, 4, 359-368.
- Haig, D. (2004). Genomic imprinting and kinship: how good is the evidence? Annual Review of Genetics, 38, 553-585.

== Books ==
- Haig, D. (2002) Genomic Imprinting and Kinship. Rutgers University Press, Piscataway, NJ. ISBN 0-8135-3027-X
- Haig, D. (2020) From Darwin to Derrida: Selfish Genes, Social Selves, and the Meanings of Life. MIT Press, Cambridge, MA. ISBN 0-2620-4378-5
