= Festschrift =

Academic work honoring a respected person

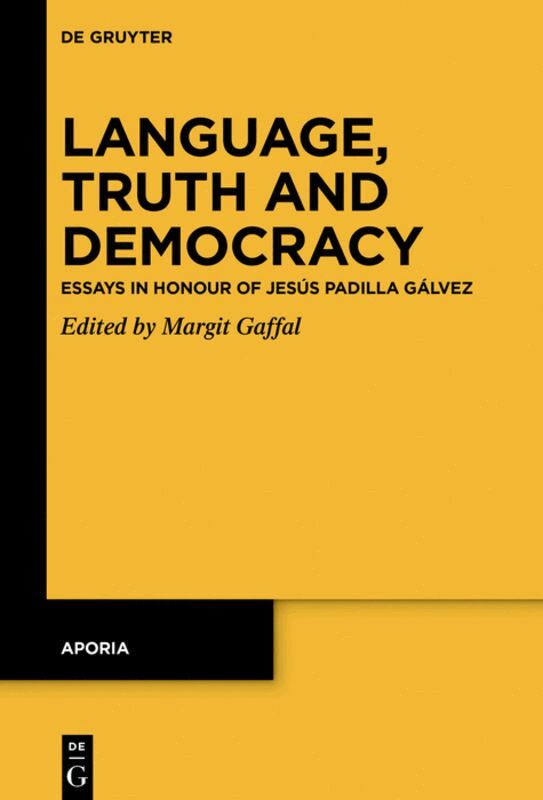
The cover of a Festschrift to the philosopher Jesús Padilla Gálvez

In academia, a Festschrift (German pronunciation: [ˈfɛst.ʃʁɪft]; plural, Festschriften [ˈfɛst.ʃʁɪftn̩]) is a book honoring a respected person, especially an academic, and presented during their lifetime. It generally takes the form of an edited volume, containing contributions from the honoree's colleagues, former pupils, and friends. Festschriften are often titled or subtitled something like Essays in Honour of [name] or Essays Presented to [name].

== Terminology ==
The term, borrowed from German and literally meaning "celebration writing", might be translated as "celebration publication" or "celebratory (piece of) writing". An alternative Latin term is liber amicorum (literally: "book of friends"). A comparable book presented posthumously is generally termed a memorial volume in English, or a Gedenkschrift (pronounced [ɡəˈdɛŋkʃʁɪft], "memorial publication") in German.

A Festschrift compiled and published by electronic means on the internet is called a Webfestschrift (pronounced either [vɛp-] or [wɛb-]), a term coined by the editors of the late Boris Marshak's Webfestschrift, Eran ud Aneran, published online in October 2003.

== History ==
Originating in Germany before World War I, this European tradition of honouring special achievements in science and culture was carried to the United States by scientists who escaped the Nazis. In the second half of the 20th century, the practice expanded internationally. Since no English term for such a book to mark a special occasion had been in use, the German word Festschrift has been incorporated into English and is frequently used without the italics that designate a foreign term, although the capitalization of the first letter is usually retained from German. Its plural may be either the original Festschriften or anglicized as Festschrifts.

== Description ==
A Festschrift contains original contributions by the honoured academic's close colleagues, often including their former doctoral students. It is typically published on the occasion of the honouree's retirement, significant birthday, or other notable career anniversary. A Festschrift can be anything from a slim volume to a work in several volumes. Aufstieg und Niedergang der römischen Welt, for example, began in 1972 as a Festschrift to commemorate the 75th birthday of Joseph Vogt, a German classical historian. Four volumes were planned, but it has since reached 89 volumes (including several which were planned for the next years, but put on hold in 1998). The essays usually relate in some way to, or reflect upon, the honouree's contributions to their scholarly field, but can include important original research by the authors. Many Festschriften also feature a tabula gratulatoria, an extended list of academic colleagues and friends who send their best wishes to the honouree.

In the case of prominent academics, several Festschriften might be prepared by various groups of students and colleagues, particularly if the scholar made significant contributions to different fields.

According to psychiatrist Claudio Naranjo, being selected by a prominent academic to edit a Festschrift can symbolize the proverbial passing of the torch. Thus, being designated to prepare such a collection is considered an honour in Germany.

== Critique ==
As Irving Louis Horowitz summarized, "Festschriften persist and multiply. Why? Because they are not just retrospective, but prospective. That is to say, the Festschrift is a Beruf, a call to further work, effort, and energy, a call to the improvement of learning, of a discipline, a science, an artistic vision, or an intellectual position. Even in this age of mass Festschriften, they remain a special literary genre".

Endel Tulving, a Canadian neuroscientist, proposed that "a Festschrift frequently enough also serves as a convenient place in which those who are invited to contribute find a permanent resting place for their otherwise unpublishable or at least difficult-to-publish papers."

In a 2014 review of the book Human Expeditions: Inspired by Bruce Trigger, Marxist archeologist Randall H. McGuire observed that "the festschrift [book] and the memorial volume are dying enterprises", and suggested that creating festschrift websites instead, because many observers think that the festschrift volumes are a waste of time, often lack coherence and frequently include articles that the authors could not publish elsewhere. He suggested that because of the weaknesses, festschrifts do not sell and publishers are reluctant to publish them.

Philosopher Alan Soble, in a review of the book Fact and Value in honor of MIT's philosopher Judith Jarvis Thomson, formulated – somewhat tongue-in-cheek – 13 conditions that should be satisfied by a Festschrift.

== See also ==
- Retrospective
- List of festschrifts
