= David Knijnenburg =

Australian actor

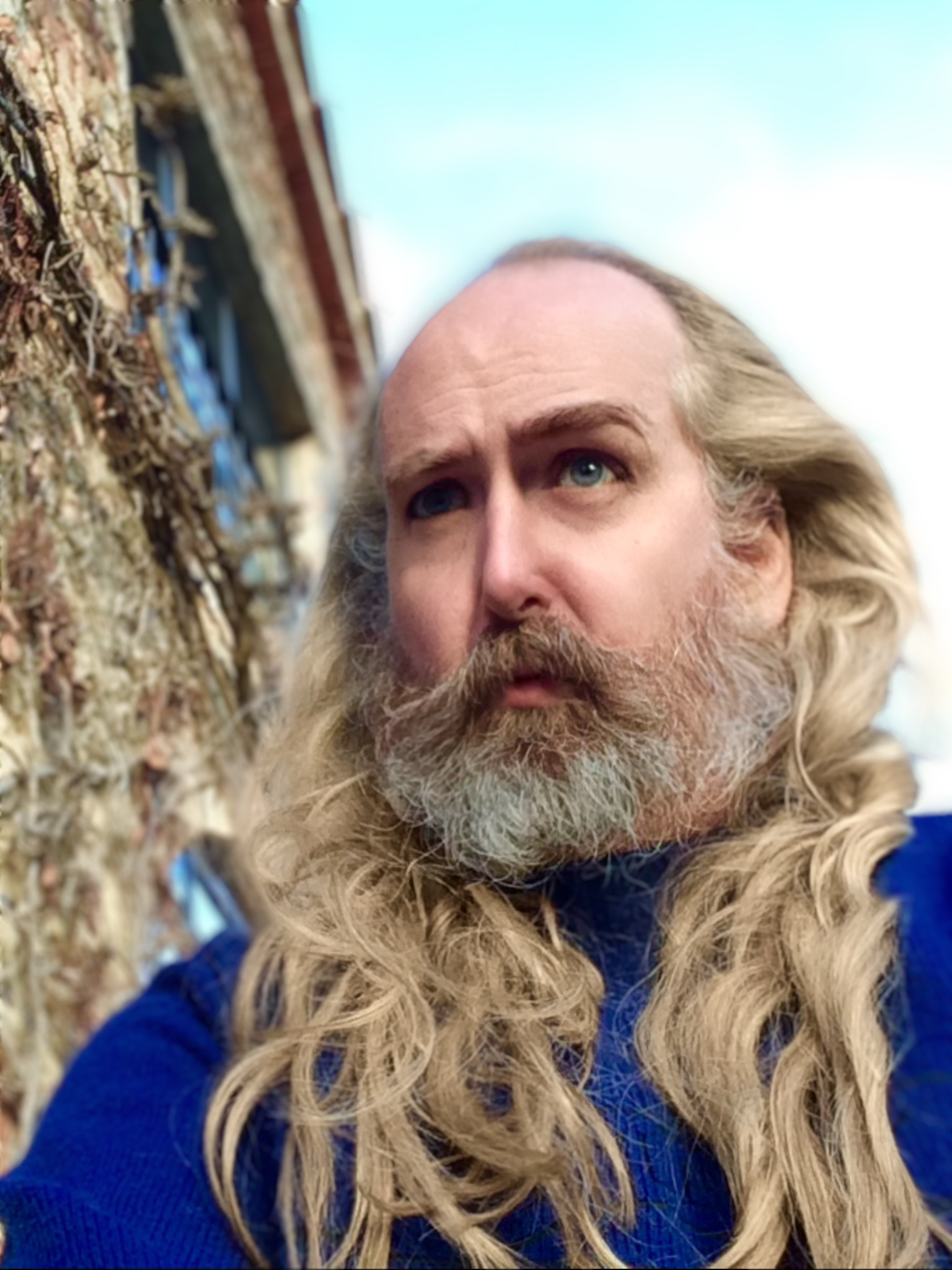
- Born: David Albertus Trelawney Knijnenburg
- Years active: 1988–present

David Albertus Trelawney Knijnenburg (/kəˈneɪnənbɜːrx/) is an Australian actor and author, best known for playing Alfred Hitchcock in his stage production Hitchcock & Herrmann, and for his novel An Australian Christmas Murder.

== Early life ==
David Albertus Trelawney Knijnenburg was born into a theatrical family of Dutch descent.

He started writing plays in primary school, and continued to create and perform comedy in high school and at university.

== Career ==
Knijnenburg began his career at the World Exposition of 1988 as a television presenter hosting a live show for NHK Japan – Japanese Television.

He performed on stage in assorted roles in Twelfth Night Theatre's numerous stage adaptations of classic BBC television series such as Dad's Army and 'Allo 'Allo!.

He wrote the play Hitchcock & Herrmann, which was his first to be performed, in March 2005 at the 4MBS performance studio. The play is based on the often stormy relationship between Alfred Hitchcock and film composer Bernard Hermann, and Knijnenburg played the character of Hitchcock in his own production, which earned good reviews. In October 2006 the play was once again staged at the Melbourne Fringe Festival, again to good reviews.

He was one of dozens of names mentioned during the media speculation over the casting of the eleventh Doctor Who, after David Tennant announced his resignation in 2008.

He was commissioned by Ulverstone's local council to write Robin Hood – Vampire Slayer, which was performed in Tasmania in 2010.

== Publications ==
Knijnenburg was the owner of The Brisbane Theatre Guide from 22 Apr 2002 until 6 December 2023, when registration was cancelled.

== Awards and nominations ==
In 2007 Knijnenburg was the voted "Best Dressed Male" for Style Magazine's "Melbourne Cup Fashions on the Field".

=== Stage awards ===
- 1999 – Winner, Harveys Award for The Importance of Being Earnest
- 2000 – Nominated, 4MBS Perform Award for Best Actor in a Drama for Whodunnit
- 2001 – Nominated, 4MBS Perform Award for Best Actor in a Drama for Agatha Christie's Murder on the Nile
- 2001 – Nominated, 4MBS Perform Award for Best Actor in a Musical for Oliver!, My Fair Lady and Joseph and the Amazing Technicolor Dreamcoat
- 2003 – Winner, Glugs Award Award for Excellence in Theatre
- 2003 – Nominated, Matilda Award for Emerging Artist
- 2005/6 – Nominated, The Book Nook Award for Best Playwright in the Matilda Award, Hitchcock & Herrmann

== Filmography ==
| Year | Title | Role | Director |
|---|---|---|---|
| 2008 | Awake | William | Skevos Mavros |
| 2008 | Daybreakers | Vampire Commuter | Michael Spierig and Peter Spierig |
| 2007 | Deadline | Detective Steve Jackman | Dean Francis |
| 2004 | Wendy's Christmas | Narrator | Johannes Knijnenburg |
| 2003 | Counterstrike | Secret Service Agent | Jerry London |
| 2003 | About Face | Peter | David Knijnenburg |
| 2003 | Timmy's Christmas | Narrator | Johannes Knijnenburg |
| 2002 | Other People | Football Player | Keiran Galvin |
| 2002 | Scooby-Doo | Traveller | Raja Gosnell |
| 2001 | No Man (Or Woman) Is An Island | Doorman | Linton Vivian |
| 2001 | The Gift | Rupert | David Knijnenburg |
| 2000 | Walk The Talk | Bank Manager | Shirley Barrett |
| 1998 | Deep Impact | Refugee | Mimi Leder |
| 1996 | Jackie Chan's First Strike | Man in China Town | Stanley Tong |

== Television ==
| Year | Title | Role | Other notes |
|---|---|---|---|
| 2003 | (s)truth | Pieter van Flaschen | Directed by Stephen Irwin for SBS Television |
| 2000 | Sir Arthur Conan Doyle's The Lost World | Tribal Trader | Season 2, Episode 3 – Tourist Season |
| 2000 | Stepsister From The Planet Weird | School Teacher | Directed by Steve Boyum for The Disney Channel |
| 2000 | Virtual Nightmare | Police Deputy | Directed by Michael Pattinson for UPN Pictures |

== Theatre ==
| Year | Title | Role | Other notes |
|---|---|---|---|
| 2009 | Tassie Talent Time | Reg Masters / Kermit the Frog | Directed by Brett Budgeon (Bass Strait Productions) |
| 2009 | The Brett Budgeon and Darryl Beaton Big Band Variety Show | MC / Kermit the Frog / Susan Boyle | Directed by Brett Budgeon (Bass Strait Productions) |
| 2009 | Ye Olde Britannia Music Hall | Chairman | Directed by Brett Budgeon (Bass Strait Productions) |
| 2008 | The Night Before Christmas | Godfather Drosselmeyer / Mouse King / Woodsman | Directed by Tama Matheson (4MBS Classic Players) |
| 2008 | Piccadilly Old Time Music Hall | Chairman | Directed by Kate Peters (Top Hat Productions/ NARPACA) |
| 2008 | Much Ado About Nothing | Friar Francis / Sexton | Directed by Tama Matheson (4MBS Classic Players / Shakespeare on Oxford Festival) |
| 2008 | One Flew Over the Cuckoo's Nest | Chief Bromden | Directed by Tony Bonner (Jally Productions) |
| 2007 | Concert with the Stars | Co-Host and Soloist | Directed by Brett Budgeon |
| 2007 | Carousel | David Bascombe | Directed by Tony Alcock (Twelfth Night Theatre) |
| 2007 | Three Little Pigs | Dame Prudence Trotter | Directed by Kate Peters (Top Hat Productions) |
| 2007 | A Midsummer Night's Dream | Francis Flute | Directed by Tama Matheson (4MBS Classic Players / Shakespeare on Oxford Festival) |
| 2007 | Cats | Bustopher Jones / Gus the Theater cat | Directed by Tim O'Connor (Harvest Rain Theatre Company) |
| 2007 | 'Allo 'Allo! | Officer Crabtree | Directed by Peter Farago (Twelfth Night Theatre) |
| 2007 | Lexie Turns To Stone | Lonny | Directed by Amy Ingram (Judith Wright Centre)played opposite Liana Werner-Gray |
| 2006 | Hitchcock & Herrmann | Alfred Hitchcock | Directed by David Knijnenburg and Jesse Rosenfeld (Melbourne Fringe Festival/ Darling You Were Marvellous Theatre Company) |
| 2005 | Run for Your Wife | Detective Sergeant Troughton | Directed by Peter Farago (Twelfth Night Theatre) |
| 2005 | Charlotte's Web | Mr Zuckermann | Directed by Lynn Pelgrave |
| 2005 | Dad's Army | The Vicar | Directed by Chris Betts (Bruce Mason Centre NZ) |
| 2005 | The Taming of the Shrew | Gremio, The Tailor and Vincentio | Directed by Mark Conaghan (Harvest Rain Theatre Company) |
| 2005 | Hitchcock & Herrmann | Alfred Hitchcock | Written and directed by David Knijnenburg (Shrine Pictures) |
| 2005 | Robin Hood And His Merry Men | Friar Tuck | Directed by Kate Peters (Top Hat Productions) |
| 2004 | The Rocky Horror Show | Doctor Scott | Directed by Tony Alcock (On The Boards Theatre Company) |
| 2004 | Piccadilly Old Time Music Hall | Chairman and Soloist | Directed by Kate Peters (Top Hat Productions) |
| 2004 | Dad's Army | The Vicar | Directed by Peter Williams (Twin Towns) |
| 2004 | Wit! | Ensemble | Directed by Jack Bradford (Bunbury Theatre Company) |
| 2004 | Dad's Army | The Vicar | Directed by Peter Williams (Twelfth Night Theatre) |
| 2004 | The Soldier's Tale | The Devil | (Collusion/ Queensland Conservatorium) |
| 2003 | Brave New World Order | Barry Jumper | Directed by Brett Heath (Brisbane Powerhouse) |
| 2002 | S.C.Superstar | Bernard, Santa's Head Elf | Directed by Damian Lee (Stage Door Dinner Theatre) |
| 2002 | Wit! | Technician 3 | Directed by Jack Bradford (La Boite Theatre D-Lab) |
| 2002 | La Bamba | The Great Cummerbundini | (La Boite Theatre) |
| 2002 | Annie | Daddy Warbucks | Directed by Jack Bradford (Brisbane Junior Theatre) |
| 2002 | La Bamba – Honk if you love... | Fritz Eberhardt von Kurfurstendam | (La Boite Theatre) |
| 2002 | Cole Porter's Can-Can | Boris Adzinidzinadze | Directed by Robert Young (Gold Coast Arts Centre) |
| 2002 | Annie | Daddy Warbucks | Directed by Jan Patterson (Ipswich Musical Theatre) |
| 2002 | La Bamba – Sunday Night Fever | Old Codger | (La Boite Theatre) |
| 2002 | Brave New World Order | Ensemble | Directed by Brett Heath (Brisbane Powerhouse) |
| 2002 | You Can't Take It with You | Paul Sycamore | Directed by Steven Tandy (Gold Coast Little Theatre) |
| 2002 | Salome | Herod Antipas | Directed by Leah Huxley (Nash Theatre) |
| 2001 | Joseph and the Amazing Technicolor Dreamcoat | Potiphar, Naphtali | Directed by Robbie Parkin (Harvest Rain Theatre Company) |
| 2001 | My Fair Lady | Zoltan Karpathy, Harry | Directed by Robert Young (Gold Coast Arts Centre) |
| 2001 | Oliver! | Mr Sowerberry | Directed by Jack Bradford (Harvest Rain Theatre Company) |
| 2001 | Agatha Christie's Murder on the Nile | Simon Mostyn | Directed by Lynn Wright (Starbuck / QPAC) |
| 2001 | Bye Bye Birdie | Ed Sullivan, Company | Directed by Robbie Parkin (Harvest Rain Theatre Company) |
| 2000 | Whodunnit | Perkins, the Butler | Directed by Alex Lanham (Brisbane Arts Theatre) |
| 2000 | Les Misérables | Student / Company | Directed by Robert Young (Gold Coast Arts Centre) |
| 2000 | Portrait -A Musical of Oscar Wilde's A Picture of Dorian Gray | Lord Fermor, Victor the Butler | Directed by John Wikman (A.P.I. Theatre Company) |
| 2000 | Joseph and the Amazing Technicolor Dreamcoat | Naphtali / Pharaoh's Guard | Directed by Robbie Parkin (Harvest Rain Theatre Company) |
| 1999 | The Importance of Being Earnest | Merriman, Lane, Oscar Wilde | Directed by Jack Bradford (Harvest Rain Theatre Company) |
| 1977 | Deidre the Dog | Deidre | Directed by Catherine Owen-Chandler (Lady of Lourdes Theatre Company) |
