= Luke Kennedy =

Australian performer (born 1982)

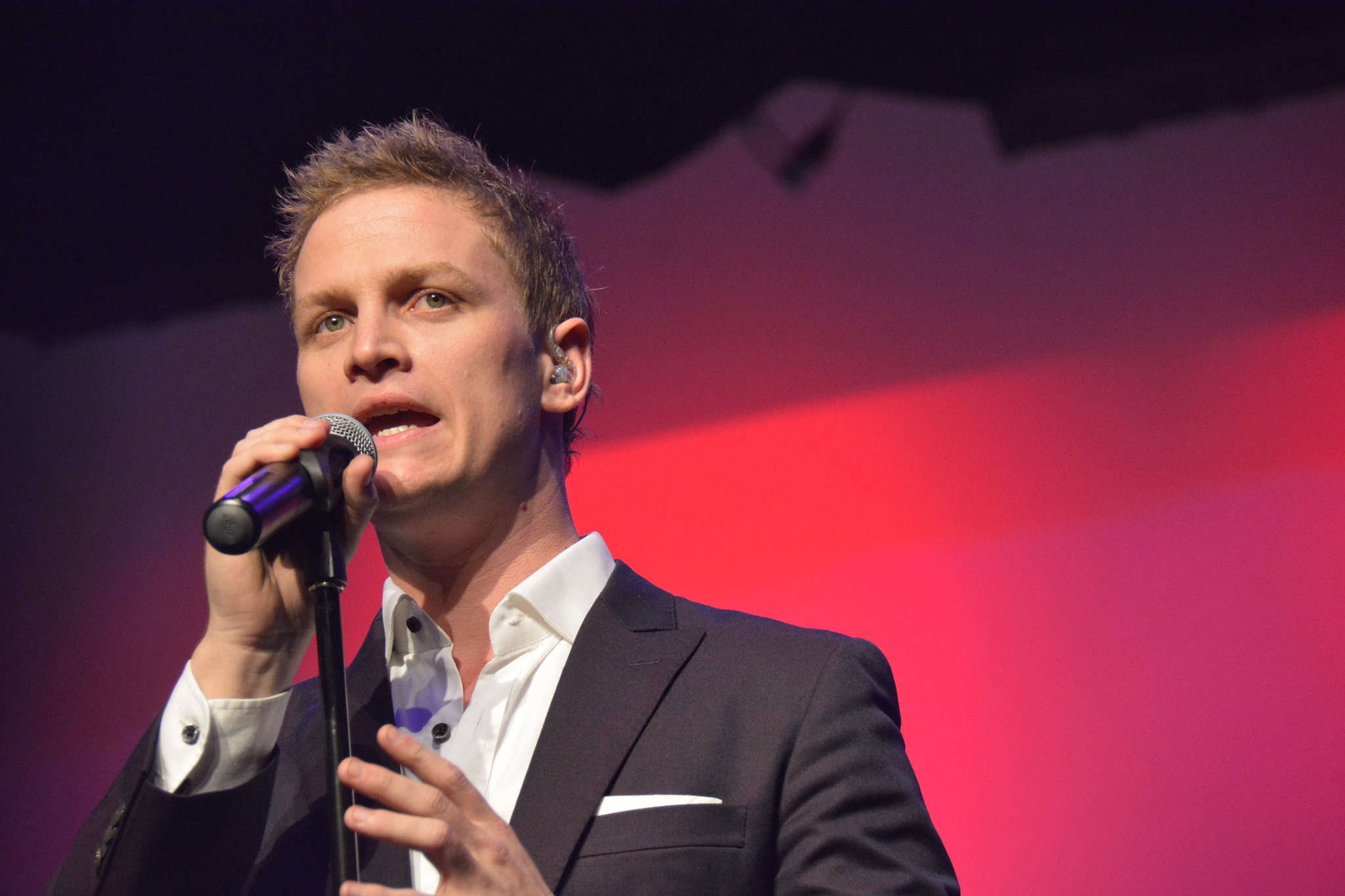
- Luke Kennedy performing at the Kingston Arts Centre on his A Time For Us tour

Background information
- Born: 1982 (age 43–44); Ipswich, Queensland, Australia
- Genres: Musical theatre, swing
- Occupations: Singer, host
- Years active: 2010–present
- Website: www.lukekennedy.com.au

Luke Kennedy is an Australian performer best known for placing second on the second season of The Voice (Australia). He has also toured internationally with the Ten Tenors and performed the title role in Jesus Christ Superstar in six different productions around Australia.

== Career ==
Luke Kennedy began his performance career in Townsville, Queensland where he performed in numerous local productions from the age of 16 onwards, including Jesus in Jesus Christ Superstar, Marius in Les Misérables and Mary Sunshine in Chicago. He moved to Brisbane in 2002 to again play the title role in Jesus Christ Superstar and continued in productions of The Wiz as the Lion, Alice, Beauty and the Beast as the Beast and Cain/Japheth in Children of Eden. In 2007, Luke played the role of Jamie in Jason Robert Brown's The Last Five Years co-starring his now-partner Brisbane-based actress Naomi Price for (Oscar Theatre Company/Judith Wright Arts Centre). In August and again in June 2011, he played the title role in a production of Jesus Christ Superstar at the QPAC Playhouse. He released his debut album, Overexposed, in July 2010 and reprised the title role in Jesus Christ Superstar, this time for the Gilbert and Sullivan Society of South Australia in Adelaide, South Australia. Kennedy returned to the role of Jesus in June 2015 for a sixth time at AIS Arena Canberra opposite Michael Falzon as Judas. Kennedy, along with Rachael Beck, Alexandra Flood and Michael Falzon joined Queensland Symphony Orchestra for Queensland Ballet's season of Strictly Gershwin in late May to early June 2016.

=== The Ten Tenors ===
Luke joined international touring group the Ten Tenors in early 2008 and in nearly two years on the road, he performed shows on nearly every continent in the world. Highlights of his time with TTT include the 2009 Jerry Lewis MDA Telethon which was broadcast to 32 million people across North America, the 2008 Emirates Melbourne Cup and the DVD recording of Amigos Para Siempre: Live in Madrid in August 2009 with the RTVE Orchestra.

=== The Voice Australia, Record Deal, and A Time For Us ===
In April 2013, Kennedy auditioned for Season 2 of The Voice Australia. He appeared on the fourth Blind Audition episode on 10 April 2013 singing "Un giorno per noi (A Time for Us)". All four coaches turned their chairs with standing ovations. Kennedy chose Ricky Martin as his coach . He was paired against "Belinda Adams" in the Battle Rounds singing Rose Laurens "I Dreamed a Dream". This resulted in Martin choosing Kennedy to go through to the Showdowns. In the Showdowns he sang "Con te partirò" by Andrea Bocelli and was voted through to the live finals by the public.

In the first Live Final he sang "Please Don't Ask Me" by John Farnham. This was the first time he has moved away from his Opera genre into a more pop genre. After impressing coach Ricky Martin the most on his team, Martin put him straight through to the top 12. In the second Live Final he sang "Freedom 90" by George Michael and this resulted in the public voting him through to the top 8. In the third Live Final Kennedy sang "Overjoyed" by Stevie Wonder. At the start of the semi-final it was revealed Kennedy was through to the last four because of this performance. In the semi-finals he had to sing two songs in one night for the first time. First up was "Caruso" by Lucio Dalla. After all of the final eight had performed their first song it was revealed that Kennedy was through to the final four after a close race between him and fellow Team Ricky member "Miss Murphy". He was through the Grand Final. He then performed his own original song "Love Is Gone".

In the Grand Final he again sang two songs. First was a group performance by the top 4 of "You're the Voice" by John Farnham and then a duet with coach Ricky Martin of "El Tango De Roxanne" by the Police. Kennedy eventually reached the top 2 but placed second to Harrison Craig.

Kennedy performed the following songs on The Voice:

Performed	Song	Original artist	Result
Blind Audition	"Un giorno per noi (A Time for Us)"		Joined Team Ricky
Battle Rounds	"I Dreamed a Dream" (against Belinda Adams)	Rose Laurens	Winner
The Showdowns, Part 3	"Con te partirò"	Andrea Bocelli	Public vote
Live Finals 1	"Please Don't Ask Me"	John Farnham	Ricky's choice
Live Finals 2	"Freedom 90"	George Michael	Public vote
Live Finals 3	"Overjoyed"	Stevie Wonder	Public vote
Semi-Finals	"Caruso"	Lucio Dalla	Public vote
Semi-Finals	"Love Is Gone"	Luke Kennedy	Public vote
Grand Final	"You're the Voice" (with Celia Pavey, Danny Ross and Harrison Craig)	John Farnham	2nd
Grand Final	"El Tango De Roxanne" (with Ricky Martin)	The Police	2nd

Just weeks after The Voice Australia finished, Kennedy along with other finalists Celia Pavey and Danny Ross signed a record contract with Universal Music Australia and it was announced his debut album, A Time For Us would be released on 12 July 2013.

Kennedy's debut single "Stay For a Minute" was released on 5 July 2013.

A Time For Us includes eleven tracks, eight of which were performed on The Voice. The other three tracks are the single, Stay For a Minute, and two other covers, Goodbye Yellow Brick Road and in My Life. A Time For Us debuted at number 6 on the Aria Charts on 13 July 2013 with 3,806 sales nationally. In its second week on the chart it stayed in the top ten at number 10. The album will be released in New Zealand later in the year when Season 2 of The Voice Australia finishes airing there. Kennedy has expressed interest in touring later in 2013 after appearing in a number of instores promoting "A Time For Us". He may also feature in Ricky Martin's upcoming Australian tour.

=== Swing on This ===
Kennedy performed in the new cabaret act Swing on This at the Adelaide Cabaret Festival on 7 June 2014. Festival Artistic Director, and singer in her own right, Kate Ceberano appeared as a special guest to perform with a cast that included Ben Mingay, Michael Falzon, and Matt Lee. Following Adelaide Cabaret Festival, they performed as the headline act at both the official black tie launch of the refurbished Bunbury Regional Entertainment Centre on 25 July and at the community concert the next evening, again playing to a full house, and this was followed in 2015 with a season at The Arts Centre Gold Coast.

== Discography ==
=== Studio albums ===
Title	Album details	Peak chart positions
Title	Album details	AUS
A Time For Us	Released: 12 July 2013; Formats: CD, digital download; Label: Universal Music Australia	6

=== Singles ===
Year	Title	Album
2013	"Stay For a Minute"	A Time for Us

== Live performance ==
Year	Title	Role	Other notes
2013	"The Voice Australia"	NA	Program created by John de Mol
2012	iWar	Achilles	Directed by Steven Mitchell Wright (Queensland Theatre Company/The Danger Ensemble)
2011	Grease	Teen Angel	Directed by Naomi Price (Harvest Rain Theatre Company/QPAC)
2011	Jesus Christ Superstar	Jesus	Directed by Tim O'Connor (Harvest Rain Theatre Company / QPAC)
2010	Carols in the City	Featured Artist	Produced by Leisa Barry-Smith (Channel Ten)
2010	Jesus Christ Superstar	Jesus	Directed by David Lampard (G&S Society of South Australia)
2010	Jesus Christ Superstar	Jesus	Directed by Tim O'Connor (Harvest Rain Theatre Company / QPAC)
2010	Songs for a New World	Man	Directed by Tim O'Connor (Harvest Rain Theatre Company / Judith Wright Centre)
2007	Alice	Various	Directed by Tim O'Connor (Harvest Rain Theatre Company)
2007	The Last Five Years	Jamie	Directed by Tim O'Connor (Oscar Theatre Company/The Judith Wright Centre)
2007	Children of Eden	Cain/Japheth	Directed by Tim O'Connor (Harvest Rain Theatre Company)
2006	Disney's Beauty and the Beast	Beast	Directed by Tim O'Connor (Harvest Rain Theatre Company)
2002	Jesus Christ Superstar	Jesus	Directed by Tim O'Connor (Harvest Rain Theatre Company)
2001	Jesus Christ Superstar	Jesus	Directed by Karen Vane ([NQOMT)
