= Oscar Theatre Company =

Theater company in Brisbane, Australia

The Oscar Theatre Company is a theater company operating in Brisbane, Australia. It is interested in the provision of further work opportunities for Queensland professional and emerging artists. The company seeks to introduce and engage youth with contemporary theatre, by offering live performance as an alternative in the Brisbane social scene. Oscar receives no funding and relies heavily on corporate sponsorship and patron support.

== History ==
Oscar Theatre Company was founded by local performer Emily Gilhome in 2004 with a view to support and produce new works and productions for young Queensland theatre artists.

== Productions ==
Year	Production	Author	Crew	Cast	Venue
2007	The Last Five Years	Jason Robert Brown	Tim O'Connor (director)	Luke Kennedy and Naomi Price	Judith Wright Arts Centre
2008	The 25th Annual Putnam County Spelling Bee	William Finn and Rachel Sheinkin	Emily Gilhome (director) and Lewis Jones (director)	Liz Buchanan, Leon Cain, Penny Farrow, Dirk Hoult, Cheyenne Kavanagh, Megan Shorey, Nick Skubij and Kimie Tsukakoshi	Roundhouse Theatre
2010-2011	[title of show]	Jeff Bowen and Hunter Bell	Emily Gilhome (Director), David Law (Musical Director)	Kynan Francis, Dash Kruck, Liz Buchanan and Bernadette Alizart	Roundhouse Theatre
2011	Spring Awakening	Steven Sater and Duncan Sheik	Emily Gilhome (Director), David Law (Musical Director), Rodney Pratt (Choreographer), Tim Wallace (Designer) and Daniel Anderson (Lighting Designer)	Featured: Dash Kruck, Charles Sells, Siobhan Kranz, Louise Brehmer and Norman Doyle	Queensland Performing Arts Centre(QPAC)
2013	Next to Normal	Brian Yorkey	Emily Gilhome (director)	Alice Barbery as Diana, Chris Kellett as Dan, Matthew Crowley as Gabe, Siobhan Kranz as Natalie, Tom Oliver as Henry and James Gauci as Dr. Fine/Dr. Madden	QPAC Cremorne Theatre
2014	Boy & Girl		Emily Gilhome (director), Jason Glenwright (lighting design), Dale Lingwood (Musical Director, Dan Venz (Choreographer) Kanika Maclean (Stage Manager), Joe Kelly (Assistant Stage Manager) and Kristen Barros (Company Manager). Band: Dale Lingwood (Keys), Daniel Robbins (Guitar), Justin Bliss (Bass) and Gene Stevens (Drums)	Company: Adwan Dickson, Aimee Butterworth, Andrew Kanofski, Ash McCready, Aya Valentine, Chris Kellett, Claire Walters, Conor Ensor, Dakota Striplin, Dan Venz, Danny Lazar, Ellen Reed, Garret Lyon, Jack Kelly, Jacqui Devereus, Jakob Evelyn, Kimie Tsukakoshi, Michael Hogan, Shannon Metzeling, Shelley Marshall, Vanessa Friscia and Josh Daveta	Visy Theatre, Powerhouse
2015	Boy & Girl 2: Mercury Rising		Emily Gilhome (director), Dan Venz (Choreographer), Joe Kelly (Co-Producer/Production Manager), Dale Lingwood (Musical Director), Jason Glenwright (Lighting Designer), Joel Devereux (Costume Designer), Falco Fox (Set Designer), Bec Lawes (Stage Manager), Jeremy Gordon (Assistant Crew), Krystal Russell(Assistant Crew), Heather Sheen (Assistant Crew) and Nick Willner (Assistant Crew). Band: Dale Lingwood (Keys), Daniel Robbins (Guitar), Justin Bliss (Bass) and Gene Stevens (Drums)	Erika Naddei	Powerhouse Theatre

== Artistic directors ==
The current Artistic and Managing Director is Emily Gilhome.
