= A Time for Us =

A Time for Us may refer to:

== Music ==
- "Love Theme from Romeo and Juliet", also known as "A Time for Us", an instrumental arranged by Henry Mancini, from Nino Rota's music for the 1968 film Romeo and Juliet
- A Time for Us (Donny Osmond album), 1973
- A Time for Us (Joey Yung album), 2009
- A Time for Us (Luke Kennedy album), 2013
- A Time for Us (Jack Jones album), 1969
- A Time for Us (Ray Conniff album), 1969

== Television ==
- A Flame in the Wind, an American soap opera, renamed A Time for Us in 1965
- Kahit Isang Saglit, a 2008 telenovela in the Philippines, Malaysia, and Singapore
