= KCWC =

KCWC may refer to:

- KCWC-DT, a television station (channel 8) licensed to serve Lander, Wyoming, United States
- KCWC-FM, a radio station (88.1 FM) licensed to serve Riverton, Wyoming
- KCWC, the Kolkata Metro station code for Chandni Chowk metro station, Kolkata, West Bengal, India
