= 2023 Australian Women in Music Awards =

Edition of annual Australian Women in Music Awards

- Date: 27 September 2023
- Venue: The Tivoli Brisbane
- Website: womeninmusicawards.com.au

The 2023 AWMA was the fourth Australian Women in Music Awards. The finalists were announced on 18 July 2023.

20 Award categories will be presented with two new awards added in the fields of Executive Leader Game Changer and Women in Heavy Music.

The winners were announced on 27 September 2023 with AWMA Founding Executive Producer and Program Director Vicki Gordon saying, "We support and promote women as vital, essential contributors to the future business growth of the sector and are calling on the industry to adopt gender equality as a core music industry value. Gender equity is still a long way in the future and we all need to remain vigilant."

== AWMA Honour Roll ==
- Renée Geyer (posthumous) and Judy Stone

== Nominees and winners ==
=== AWMA Awards ===
Winners indicated in boldface, with other nominees in plain.

Full list of nominees
Lifetime Achievement Award	Humanitarian Award
**Jeannie Lewis**; **Clare Moore**; **Kate Ceberano**; note: three winners	**Alison Hams**; Andrea Smith; Gemma Farrell
Diversity in Music Award	Studio Production Award
**Cerisa Benjamin**; Ruth O'Brien; Ripple Effect Band	**Robyn Lee Payne**; Candice Lorrae; Elise Reitze-Swensen
Live Creative Production Award	Live Production Touring Award
**Naomi Price**; Nikki Nouveau; Sarah Ponturo	**Jenny Moon**; Karen-lee Herrmann; Stacey Queffert
Music Leadership Award	Songwriter Award
**Marianna Annas**; Mary Jo Capps (AM); Beth Appleton	**Toni Watson**; Sarah McLeod; Tanya Batt
Music Photographer Award	Film-maker Award
**Mia Mala McDonald**; Ruby Boland; Lucinda Goodwin	**Triana Hernandez**; Philippa Bateman; Amy Louisee
Artistic Excellence Award	Creative Leadership Award
**Vika & Linda**; Jessica Mauboy; Beccy Cole	**Claire Edwardes**; Sharni Honor; Chelsea Wilson
Excellence in Classical Music Award	Music Journalist Award
**Celia Craig**; Jenny Duck-Chong; Anne Cawrse	**Jane Gazzo**; Tait McGregor; Stephanie Eslake
Women in Heavy Music Award	Emerging Artist Award
**Emmy Mack**; Jelena Goluza; Amy Simmons	**Ashli**; Jem Cassar-Daley; Merinda Dias-Jayasinha
Executive Leader Game Changer Award	Inspiration Award
**Emily Collins**; Nazlican Eren; Sophie Galaise	**Vanessa Amorosi**
