= Hitchcock & Herrmann =

2005 stage play by David Knijnenburg

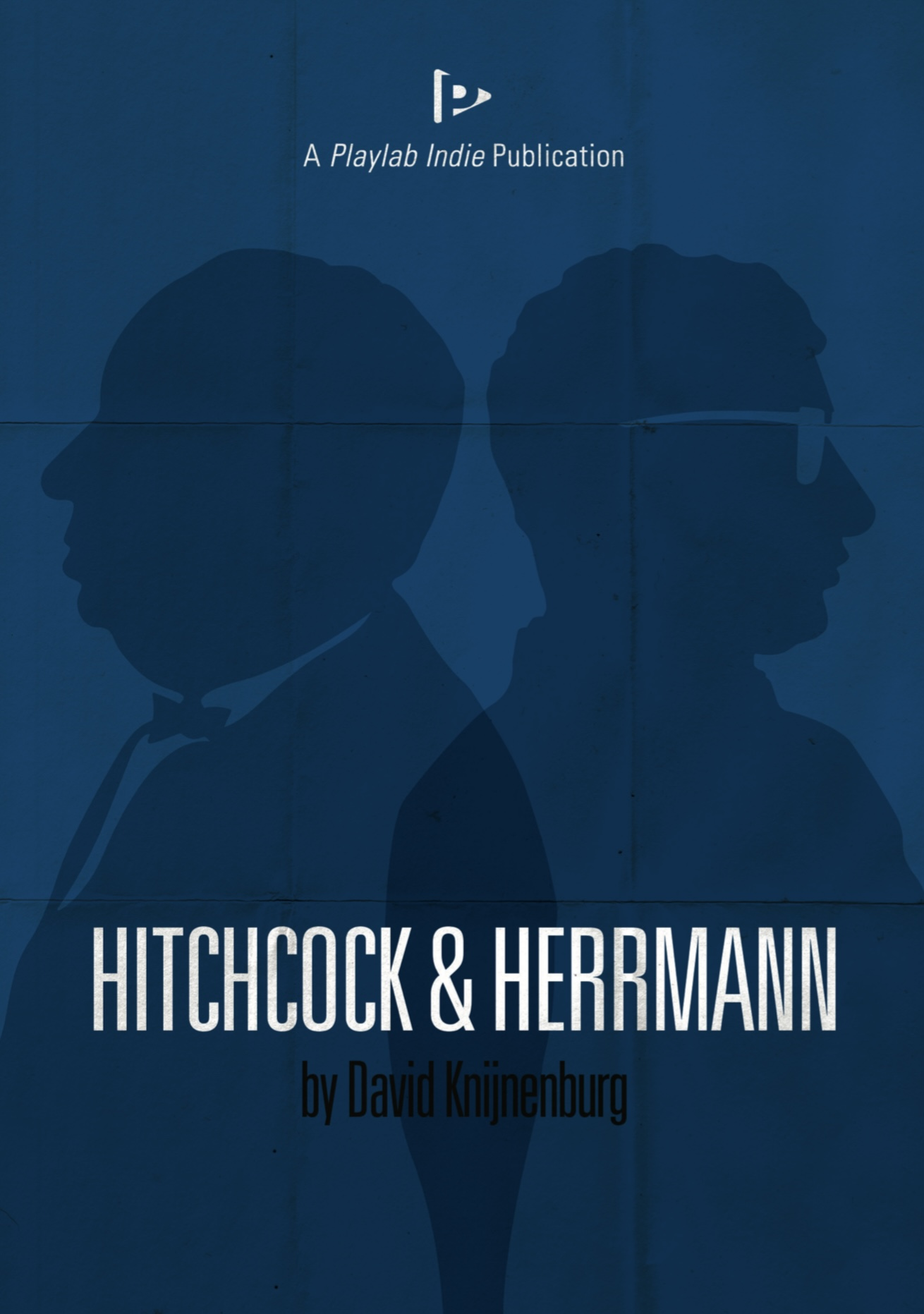
- First edition
- Author: David Knijnenburg
- Language: English
- Publisher: Playlab Press
- Publication date: August 2021
- Publication place: Australia
- Pages: 25
- ISBN: 978-1761610325

Hitchcock & Herrmann is a play written by David Knijnenburg which examines the relationship between film director Alfred Hitchcock and musical composer Bernard Herrmann.

== Synopsis ==
By combining a talent for self-promotion and producing films that were popular, Alfred Hitchcock became a director of motion pictures. A talent in the world of musical composition, Bernard Herrmann was a child prodigy who had worked with Orson Welles before finding a collaboration with Hitchcock on The Trouble with Harry, The Man Who Knew Too Much, The Wrong Man, North by Northwest, Vertigo, Psycho, The Birds and Marnie. After ten years the two men ended their collaboration.

== Themes ==
Through what is two intersecting monologues the play Hitchcock & Herrmann explores the relationship between these two geniuses and endeavours to explain in their own words why at the height of their creative talents they parted company and never worked together again. Interspersed throughout are examples of Herrmann's music - often taking the place for important dramatic points.

== Production history ==
=== Australia ===
The play was first performed in January 2005 as a rehearsed reading at the 4MBS Performance Studio in Brisbane, Australia with Knijnenburg himself playing the part of Hitchcock and Yalin Ozucelik as Bernard Herrmann. This reading was somewhat of a rushed affair in order to accommodate Ozucelik, who was soon to begin studies at NIDA and would subsequently be unavailable.

Nevertheless, the show was a success, resulting in a three-week performance season in March 2005. Knijnenburg again played Hitchcock, however this time the role of Bernard Herrmann was taken by Michael Priest.

Further successes followed culminating in a nomination for Best Playwright in the 2005 Matilda Awards for Excellence in Live Drama. Other nominees in the category included world-famous playwright David Williamson.

In 2006 Knijnenburg was invited to perform the show at the Melbourne Fringe Festival. With Michael Priest unavailable a new actor was cast in the role of Bernard Herrmann - Jesse Rosenfeld, a young actor who had recently graduated from the Victorian College of the Arts but had been acting since the age of twelve when he appeared in Bruce Beresford's film Paradise Road alongside Pamela Rabe, Pauline Collins, Glenn Close and Cate Blanchett and has since joined the cast of the television series Neighbours.

In 2021 the play was published by Playlab Press.
