= Talking Back at Thunder =

- Directed by: Esté Heyns, Aaron Davison
- Written by: Aaron Davison
- Produced by: Aaron Davison, Esté Heyns
- Starring: Steven Tandy; Melanie Zanetti; Aaron Davison
- Cinematography: Este Heyns
- Edited by: Mason Hoffman
- Music by: Mitch Pattugalan
- Production company: Head Productions
- Release date: 2014
- Running time: 88 minutes
- Country: Australia
- Language: English

Talking Back at Thunder is a 2014 Australian thriller film directed by Este Heyns and Aaron Davison, written by Aaron Davison, and starring Steven Tandy as the film's antagonist.

== Plot ==
All is good for Jacob. A plumber by trade, he has a job he enjoys, and a fiancé whom he loves. He’s the quintessential, everyday man living his life in a provincial coastal Queensland town. A veritable bomb soon shatters his path by way of an old demon from his childhood.

Surrounding lush cane fields turn to icy tundra, as Jacob tries to cope with the crippling anxiety and haunting trauma that he’s managed to suppress over the years. Facing his biggest task yet, he is forced to tackle these issues before they swamp him and ruin his life.

Set with Northern Australia’s cane country as its backdrop, Talking Back At Thunder delves fearlessly into the barely-lit cavern that is anxiety, trauma, and rage in the everyday Aussie male.

== Cast ==
- Steven Tandy as Phillips
- Melanie Zanetti as Kyra
- Kerith Atkinson as Dr. Wilson
- Aaron Davison as Jacob
- Nelle Lee as Tennielle
- Peter Marshall as Barry

== Production ==
The film was shot over four weeks, and set in Bundaberg, Queensland.

== Reception ==
Talking Back at Thunder was selected into the Colorado Film Festival.

=== Accolades ===
| Award | Category | Result |
|---|---|---|
| Colorado Film Festival | Special Jury Prize | Won |

== Release ==
Talking Back at Thunder came out on VOD via film streaming platform, Ozflix.tv on 26 January 2017.
