= List of actors considered for the part of the Doctor =

Many actors have been considered for the part of The Doctor in the British science fiction television show Doctor Who. The casting announcement is a significant event for fans of the show, and is speculated on by news media. The following is a list of actors who have been considered for the role.

== Primary Doctors ==
=== First Doctor ===
Geoffrey Bayldon declined the role of the Doctor as Doctor Who was scheduled for 52 weeks and required him to play an old man. He told his agent, "Tell them: Too long, too old". He later played an alternative version of the Doctor in two plays for the Doctor Who Unbound series of audio plays by Big Finish Productions: Auld Mortality (2003) and A Storm of Angels (2005). In addition, he played Organon in the Fourth Doctor serial The Creature from the Pit (1979).

Hugh David was the choice of Rex Tucker, who was the series' "caretaker producer" before the arrival of Verity Lambert. Lambert rejected this idea on the grounds that at 38, Hugh was too young. David later became a director and, in that capacity, worked on the Second Doctor serials The Highlanders (1966–7) and Fury from the Deep.

Alan Webb was then offered the role but declined, as did Cyril Cusack.

Leslie French was considered for the role. He later appeared in the Seventh Doctor serial Silver Nemesis (1988) as Lady Peinforte's mathematician.

The role of the First Doctor went to William Hartnell.

=== Second Doctor ===
Brian Blessed was offered the role, but declined because of scheduling conflicts; he later played King Yrcanos in the Sixth Doctor serial The Trial of a Time Lord. Rupert Davies, Valentine Dyall and Sir Michael Hordern were all approached for the role but none wanted to commit to a long-running series. Dyall later played the Black Guardian in the television stories The Armageddon Factor (1979), Mawdryn Undead (1983), Terminus (1983) and Enlightenment (1983) and Slarn in the audio drama Slipback (1985). Peter Cushing was also offered the role, but declined and later regretted his decision. He appeared in the big-screen versions of Doctor Who in Dr. Who and the Daleks (1965) and Daleks – Invasion Earth: 2150 A.D. (1966) as Dr. Who.

The role of the Second Doctor went to Patrick Troughton.

=== Third Doctor ===
Ron Moody was said to be the producers' first choice after his success in Oliver! but he turned down the role, which he later regretted. Stratford Johns was also offered the role. Johns went on to play Monarch in the Fifth Doctor serial "Four to Doomsday".

The role of the Third Doctor went to the producers' second choice, Jon Pertwee.

=== Fourth Doctor ===
Graham Crowden, who played Soldeed in The Horns of Nimon (1979), turned down the role as he would only commit to one year instead of the three years asked by producer Barry Letts, while Michael Bentine turned down the role when the production team felt he wanted too much influence over the series' scripts. Other actors considered included Bernard Cribbins, who played Tom Campbell in Daleks' Invasion Earth 2150 A.D. (1966) and later played Wilfred Mott in the Revived Series, and Fulton Mackay, who had previously played Dr. Quinn in Doctor Who and the Silurians (1970). Richard Hearne was offered the role but his insistence that he play the part in the style of his 'Mr Pastry' character was not acceptable to the series' producer, Barry Letts. Also considered was Carry On actor Jim Dale.

The role of the Fourth Doctor went to Tom Baker.

=== Fifth Doctor ===
Iain Cuthbertson was considered by producers for the role when Tom Baker left. In addition, Richard Griffiths was visited by producer John Nathan-Turner to discuss the role, but was unavailable.

The role of the Fifth Doctor went to Peter Davison.

=== Sixth Doctor ===
The role of the Sixth Doctor was offered to Colin Baker without an audition. No auditions were held for the role, as Baker was the first choice.

Sylvester McCoy did express interest.

=== Seventh Doctor ===
In 1986, the then Controller of BBC One, Michael Grade, unhappy with the current state of Doctor Who, wrote to Sydney Newman to enquire whether he had any ideas for reformatting the series. On 6 October 1986, Newman wrote back to Grade with a suggestion that Patrick Troughton should return to the role of the Doctor for a season, and then regenerate into a female, with Newman suggesting either Joanna Lumley, Dawn French or Frances de la Tour to succeed Troughton. Grade then suggested that Newman meet the current Head of Drama, Jonathan Powell, for lunch to discuss the ideas. Newman and Powell did not get on well, however, and nothing came of their meeting.

The final three actors considered for the role were Sylvester McCoy, Ken Campbell and Chris Jury. While Campbell's portrayal was considered too dark for the series, Jury was remembered by the production team and cast as Kingpin in 1988's The Greatest Show in the Galaxy, though many years later he disclosed that he had never known that he had been on the shortlist for the role.

McCoy's audition process included a read-through in costume of a sample scene, playing against Janet Fielding. The actors Dermot Crowley and David Fielder also auditioned for the role in the same manner. Andrew Sachs was offered the role of the Seventh Doctor but he turned it down. Later, he regretted it, saying "it was one of his sad tales of failure in life" and hoped the offer came around again. Hugh Futcher was also considered.

The role of the Seventh Doctor went to Sylvester McCoy.

=== Eighth Doctor ===
Michael Jackson and Bill Cosby were originally considered for the role as part of a proposed Paramount Pictures Doctor Who film in 1988. It is unclear whether the film would have followed the continuity of the television show. Peter Mackenzie Litten, co-founder of the Daltenreys production company which held the film rights to Doctor Who, turned down the Paramount deal as he felt it did not "protect the integrity of the Doctor Who brand". Daltenreys were also involved in further projects involving Donald Sutherland and Tim Curry in the role, which were cancelled in early stages.

Had the show continued past 1989, the producers were again considering Richard Griffiths for the role of the Eighth Doctor.

In the early 1990s, the BBC approached Verity Lambert to revive the show. Lambert wanted Peter Cook to play the new Doctor at the time, but he eventually declined involvement.

By 1993, Daltenreys had gained backing for a Doctor Who film starring Alan Rickman. The film was to be directed by Leonard Nimoy. However, production was shelved as the BBC withdrew the rights.

Actors who auditioned for the role in the 1996 film included Michael Crawford, Rowan Atkinson (who played a spoof version of the Doctor in The Curse of Fatal Death), Liam Cunningham (who appeared in the 2013 Doctor Who episode "Cold War"), Mark McGann (brother of Paul McGann), Trevor Eve, Michael Palin, Robert Lindsay, Eric Idle, Tim McInnerny (who appeared in the 2008 Doctor Who episode "Planet of the Ood"), Nathaniel Parker, Peter Woodward, John Sessions (who later played Tannis in the audio drama Death Comes to Time, and voiced Gus in the 2014 Doctor Who episode Mummy on the Orient Express), Anthony Head (who appeared in the 2006 Doctor Who episode "School Reunion", narrated episodes of the Doctor Who Confidential behind-the-scenes series, and provided voice-acting work for both the televised The Infinite Quest and the Excelis story arc from Big Finish Productions), Rik Mayall, and Tony Slattery. Billy Connolly has stated that he was also considered for the part. Peter Capaldi was invited to audition, but declined, as he "didn't think [he] would get it, and... didn't want to just be part of a big cull of actors." Capaldi was eventually cast as the Twelfth Doctor. Harry Van Gorkum was cast as the role for the Eighth Doctor but the BBC, unlike Fox and Universal did not find him a fitting choice. Roger Rees was approached and showed interest.

The role of the Eighth Doctor went to Paul McGann.

=== Ninth Doctor ===
In 2003, Bill Baggs was set to make a 40th-anniversary special for BBC South with Alan Cumming as the Doctor. Baggs had directed numerous unofficial Doctor Who-related productions since the show's cancellation, including The Airzone Solution, which featured Cumming in another role. The special was cancelled when the BBC instead commissioned Russell T Davies to revive the series.

Hugh Grant (who also played an incarnation of the Doctor in Curse of Fatal Death) has stated that he turned down the role and expressed his regret once he saw how the show turned out. According to Russell T Davies, Martin Clunes (whose television debut had been in the serial "Snakedance" in 1983) was considered at an early stage of development.

Producer Jane Tranter also considered casting Judi Dench as the Ninth Doctor.

The role of the Ninth Doctor went to Christopher Eccleston.

=== Tenth Doctor ===
The role of the Tenth Doctor went to David Tennant. This was decided before the first episode of the revival aired, due to Eccleston's departure after a single season.

=== Eleventh Doctor ===
Russell Tovey auditioned and screen-tested for the part of the Doctor, having been recommended to Steven Moffat's new production team by outgoing showrunner Russell T Davies. Moffat briefly considered casting Peter Capaldi. On November 27, 2008, an Australian Newspaper reported a story hinting that Dutch/Australian actor David Knijnenburg was under consideration for the part. Despite the highly speculative nature of the report, it was neither confirmed nor denied by the BBC or the actor himself and the story was picked up by other sources. Comparatively unknown outside Australia, his appointment seemed unlikely although he was favourably recommended by previous Doctor Sylvester McCoy. The role was reportedly offered to Chiwetel Ejiofor, who turned it down.

Other actors considered included Paterson Joseph, who appeared in the Doctor Who episodes "Bad Wolf" and "The Parting of the Ways", David Morrissey, who would be appearing in the 2008 Christmas special, "The Next Doctor", Sean Pertwee, son of Third Doctor actor Jon Pertwee, Catherine Zeta-Jones, James Nesbitt and Billie Piper, who played companion Rose Tyler in the first two series of the revival.

The role of the Eleventh Doctor went to Matt Smith.

=== Twelfth Doctor ===
Ben Daniels revealed to Digital Spy that he had been included on a shortlist of actors in the running for the role, but was not the production team's first choice.

The role of the Twelfth Doctor went to Peter Capaldi.

=== Thirteenth Doctor ===
Following the news that the tenth series would be Peter Capaldi's last as the Doctor, several media reports and bookmakers had speculated as to who would replace Capaldi as the Thirteenth Doctor. Bookmakers' favourites included Ben Whishaw, Phoebe Waller-Bridge, Kris Marshall, and Tilda Swinton.

When referring to if the new Doctor would be a woman, incoming Doctor Who showrunner Chris Chibnall originally was quoted in February 2017, as saying "Nothing is ruled out but I don't want the casting to be a gimmick and that's all I can say". The role of the Thirteenth Doctor went to Jodie Whittaker, the first woman to play the Doctor in the television series. She had previously worked with Chibnall in Broadchurch. Chibnall said that he always wanted a woman for the part and that Whittaker was their first choice. Whittaker has said that other actresses auditioned for the part.

=== Fourteenth and Fifteenth Doctor ===
Several actors and actresses were heavily rumoured to be taking over from Whittaker, including Hugh Grant, Michael Sheen, Kris Marshall, Richard Ayoade, Michaela Coel, Kelly Macdonald, and Lenny Henry. Davies' return also led to speculation that an actor he had previously worked with in other projects would join him as the Fourteenth Doctor, with Olly Alexander, Lydia West, Omari Douglas, T'Nia Miller and Fisayo Akinade ranking highly in bookies' odds. Rumours also circulated that David Tennant would reprise his role, having previously portrayed the Tenth Doctor during Davies' time as showrunner, or that Jo Martin, who debuted as the Fugitive Doctor during Whittaker's tenure, would be revealed as the Fourteenth incarnation.

Ncuti Gatwa had previously been announced as Jodie Whittaker's successor, making him the first black actor to lead the series and the second black actor to play the Doctor (after Jo Martin). Many reports stated he would play the Fourteenth Doctor and that Whittaker's Thirteenth Doctor would regenerate into an incarnation portrayed by Gatwa. Upon Whittaker's final episode, in 2022, "The Power of the Doctor", as the character, she instead regenerated into a form seemingly similar to the Tenth Doctor. This character, portrayed by David Tennant, was confirmed to be the Fourteenth Doctor, with later clarification that Gatwa would actually portray the Fifteenth Doctor.

== Others ==
=== Radio plays ===
Boris Karloff was approached to play the Doctor for a proposed radio series by Stanmark Productions in the late 1960s. Karloff declined, and Peter Cushing was hired to reprise his film version of "Dr. Who" for a pilot episode titled "Journey into Time" that was recorded, but the BBC passed on the series. As of 2014, the location of the recording is unknown.

=== Unspecified ===
In 2013, Bill Nighy said that the BBC had approached him about the possibility of him playing the Doctor, but that he had declined, feeling that the role came with "too much baggage". Nighy did not specify when this occurred out of respect to the actor who was eventually cast. Nighy had appeared in the role of Dr. Black in the 2010 Doctor Who episode "Vincent and the Doctor".

In 2017, Alan Cumming said that he had been approached about playing the character on two occasions, once by Russell T Davies and once by Mark Gatiss, but that the deal-breaker both times had been his reluctance to relocate to Cardiff. Cumming later appeared in the 2018 Doctor Who episode "The Witchfinders" portraying King James I and the 2025 episode "Lux" as Mr. Ring-a-Ding.

At a 2017 convention, John Challis spoke of his onetime desire to play the Doctor, and that he had been briefly, but not seriously considered for the role.

In 2019, Rafe Spall appeared on an episode of Sky's There's Something About Movies and claimed that he "got quite close to being Doctor Who". He explained that he was told not to tell anyone but told people regardless, and when the production team learned that he was "blabbing his mouth off", he was removed from consideration.

In 2022, Ben Miller stated on The One Show that he was asked if he would be interested in being Doctor Who "a few years" ago. He had said he was interested, but "never heard anything else ever again". Miller appeared as the Sheriff of Nottingham in the 2014 Doctor Who episode "Robot of Sherwood".
