= Central Wyoming College =

Community college in Riverton, Wyoming, US

Central Wyoming College (CWC)
- Type: Public community college
- Established: 1966; 60 years ago
- President: Dr. Brad Tyndall
- Students: 2,688
- Undergraduates: 2,688
- Location: Riverton, Wyoming, United States; 43°01′50″N 108°25′39″W
- Campus: Rural
- Nickname: Rustlers
- Sporting affiliations: NJCAA
- Mascot: Rusty the Rustler
- Website: cwc.edu

Central Wyoming College (CWC or CW) is a public community college in Riverton, Wyoming. In addition to its main campus, the college provides online classes and has outreach centers in Jackson, Lander, Dubois, and the Wind River Indian Reservation.

Central Wyoming College is best known for its associate degree nursing program. Additionally, it owns Wyoming's only public television network, Wyoming PBS, as well as a student-operated FM radio station, KCWC-FM.

== History ==
=== Founding ===
CWC was founded in 1966 by a county-wide vote, though community leaders originally conceived the idea of a community college in the county in 1950. The college took a long time to solidify because of a disagreement over its two proposed locations, Lander and Riverton. District boundary conflicts further postponed college planning until 1960. The Wyoming Community College Commission in 1964 informed the planning groups in Fremont County that the location dispute would have to be resolved before the proposed college would receive its serious consideration.

A June 1965 poll showed Fremont County residents favored a college by a 5-1 majority, and a 3-2 majority favored Riverton as the site. However, Lander supporters were persistent and returned once more to the commission, proposing the college be located in the county seat. The college commission heeded the results of the survey, though, and gave its approval to the Riverton proposal.

=== 1960s ===
In December 1966, the college board selected the former Mund/Dobler farm on the west edge of Riverton as the site for the college campus because of its highway frontage, mountain views, and fertile topsoil. Before campus buildings were constructed, the first classes were held in the basement of a downtown bank. The first buildings on the new college campus - a library, science/classroom facility, and utility building - opened on September 23, 1968. At the time, the college had 26 faculty and 230 students. The college's newly formed Foundation dedicated a portion of the campus property to a technical park with a philosophy the community would attract industry to Riverton oriented toward education.

With the first full-time students enrolled, CWC officials appealed to the people of Riverton for suitable housing. A local contractor built an off-campus girls' dormitory with room for 14 students in 1968.

A year after the college was established, the University of Wyoming leased its Sinks Canyon experimental farm to CWC, which the college formally acquired four years later. The university had been donated the land in 1892, and used it for agricultural experiments until 1943. The 126-acre (0.51 km^{2}) property, located four miles (6.4 km) south of Lander, is now known as the Central Wyoming College Sinks Canyon Center, and is used for both recreational and educational purposes.

=== 1970s ===
Central Wyoming College continued to construct campus facilities in the 1970s. The college was truly able to recruit from beyond its commuter area when a Residence Hall was constructed in 1973. An apartment complex, later named the East Apartments, was constructed in 1978 and inhabited by students with families as well as single students. In 1979, the West Apartments were built. Also in the 1970s, the campus grew with the construction of a student activities building in 1973 and a vocational-technical building in 1978.

The college's programs and services expanded with the campus and the community's needs as well. Programs such as construction trades, diesel mechanics, drafting, and electronics came about as the community flourished with during a boom in the minerals industry. With the times, and changes in the college service area's economy, those programs went away and others - such as nursing, broadcasting, equine studies and computer networking - were established. Being a comprehensive community college, CWC offered non-credit community services courses and adult basic skills classes as well.

The Rustler replaced the Shaman as the college mascot in 1975, after concerns were voiced by members of the local American Indian population.

=== 1980s ===
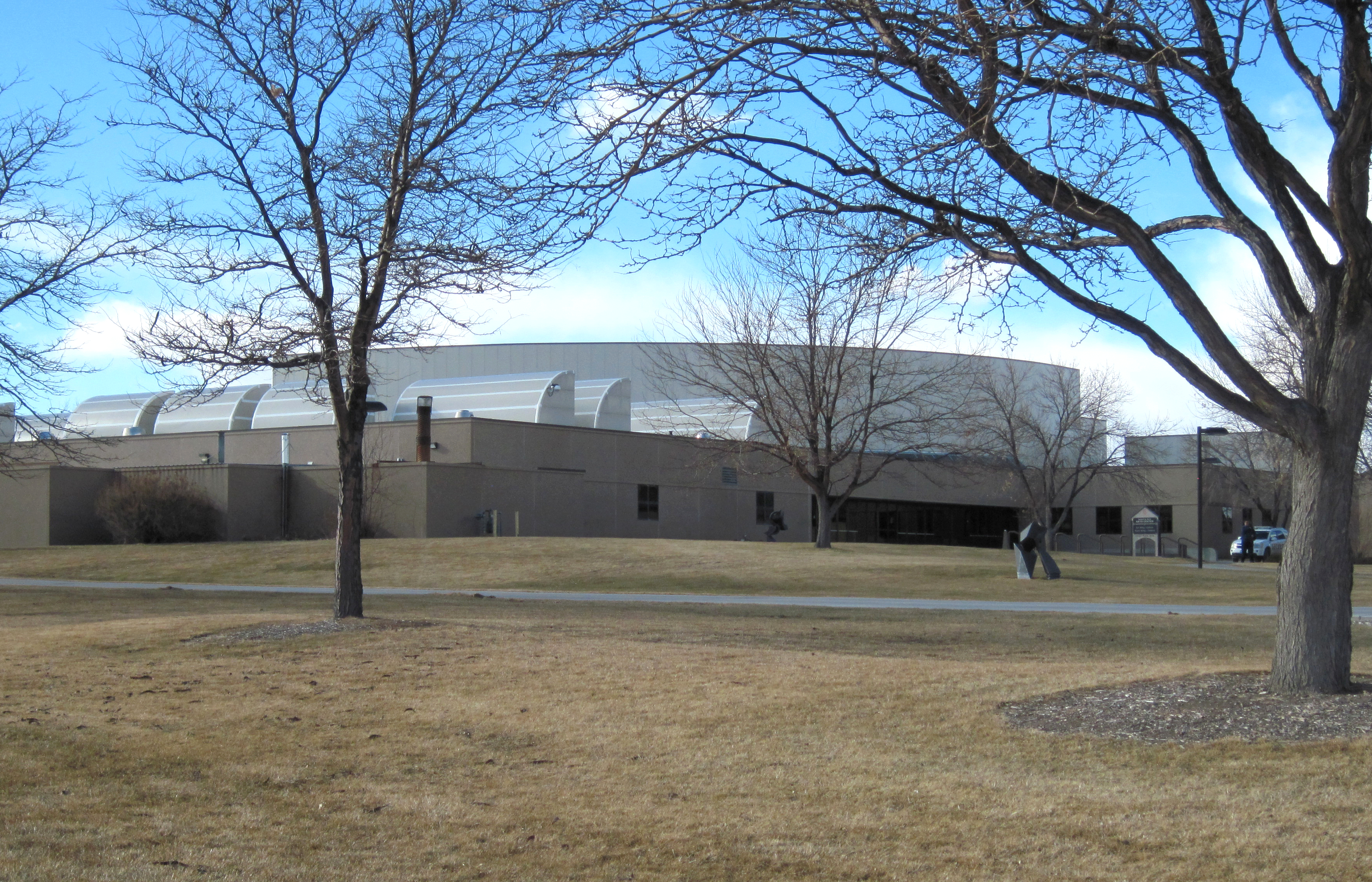
CWC's Robert A. Peck Arts Center, built-in 1983.

Activity awards for visual and performing art students were also added because CWC had established itself as the cultural center of the region with the construction of the Robert A. Peck Arts Center in 1983. Also in 1983, KCWC-TV went on the air for the first time, marking the beginning of what is now Wyoming PBS. Before then, students enrolled in broadcasting or journalism operated the station on the Riverton cable system using channel 4.CWC was instrumental in bringing educational television to the area even back then in the early days using Riverton cable and having a fully operational studio. Much of its programming however was in black and white in the late '60s and early '70s. Plans for the college FM station began at this decade as well. Longtime faculty member JoAnne McFarland was appointed college president in 1989.

=== 1990s ===
In the early 1990s, the college was faced with a huge decline in local tax revenue and a new problematic state funding formula. The institution was forced to take severe cuts in its budget. In the early years, CWC had intercollegiate athletics, and even won regional titles in basketball, volleyball and tennis. However, budget woes in the early 1990s forced the college to eliminate round ball sports. CWC converted the scholarships offered to athletes into academic scholarships. At the same time, the college was serving a severely economically depressed population, and these dismal factors were reflected in the college's student body, which was primarily low-income, educationally disadvantaged, and older than average. The combination of limited resources, changing technology, traditional curricula, and a diverse, rural and disadvantaged student population with a high attrition rate presented the college's administration with enormous challenges.

The college staff became aggressive in pursuing outside resources, and stepped up grant writing activities to help get the college back on track. As a result, Central Wyoming College secured millions of dollars in grants to assure the college was responsive to the educational needs of its community. CWC is the only Wyoming community college with a federally supported Student Support Services Program, which supplies tutorial support, counseling and transfer advisement free of charge to students. In 1996, CWC secured a $1.75 million Title III grant, which has had a major positive impact on the college in terms of curriculum development, computer-aided instruction and student retention. In 1997, the college was awarded a $10 million grant to implement distance education technology to improve access to education for rural and isolated schools, and to provide teacher training in the use of high tech multimedia and curriculum development.

Much of the campus was remodeled in 1994. During this period Main Hall was constructed, becoming the campus's flagship building. Also, the current food court was built onto the 1973 student activities center.

=== 2000s ===
In 2006, Central Wyoming College re-initiated an intercollegiate volleyball program that was followed by men's and women's basketball programs in 2008. CWC's rodeo team competes in the Central Rocky Mountain Region and consistently places highly at the College National Finals Rodeo.

The college's aggressive technology plan not only focuses on technology in education, but also includes agreements with private entities, boosting cooperation and sharing of resources. Through agreements with Microsoft and Cisco Systems, an innovative degree program in Computer Networking Technologies was developed.

The new millennium has marked significant increases in student enrollment for Central Wyoming College, in addition to new construction on campus. A new student residence hall was constructed in 2002, and the college's Intertribal Education and Community Center opened in the fall of 2010. A new health and science center was completed in 2013.

JoAnne McFarland retired from her position as college president in 2014 and was replaced by Dr. Cristobal Valdez. Valdez left the college in July 2016. During that same year, which marked the institution's fiftieth anniversary, the administration wing of CWC's Main Hall was remodeled. This was to create space for the college's new Rustler Central area, which brought together various departments, including advising, records, and financial aid, for easier student access. In 2020, Central Wyoming College, in partnership with the University of Wyoming, began offering two undergraduate courses in Business wherein students could earn their Bachelor of Science Degree either online or on campus at Central Wyoming College.

== Facilities ==
JoAnne Youtz McFarland Health & Science Center

=== Campus ===
Central Wyoming College's 60-acre (24 ha) campus is located on the west side of Riverton, Wyoming, along US Highway 26. It has six major buildings, with four residential structures located on the campus's northern edge.

- Intertribal Education and Community Center
- JoAnne Youtz McFarland Health & Science Center
- Lowell A. Morfeld Student Center
- Main Hall (library, classroom wing, administration wing)
- Professional-Technical Center
- Robert A. Peck Arts Center

Student housing

- East Apartments
- Mote Hall
- Residence Hall
- West Apartments

=== Outreach and additional facilities ===
The college's Equine Center, where its equine studies program is based, is located behind housing at the Main Campus in Riverton.

Central Wyoming College maintains a classroom building in Lander (the county seat), a community located 25 miles (40 km) from Riverton. The current Lander structure was built in 2015, replacing an older downtown facility that the college had used for decades. four miles (6.4 km) south of Lander is Central Wyoming College's 126-acre (0.51 km^{2}) Sinks Canyon Center, which has classroom and housing facilities used primarily by the college's outdoor education students.

The college also maintains outreach centers in Jackson, Dubois, and Fort Washakie.

== Television and radio ==
=== KCWC-TV ===
Wyoming PBS operates as a division of Central Wyoming College, with office and studio space located on-campus. As part of their degree program, students majoring in television broadcasting assist in the creation of programs for the station. KCWC-TV first went on the air in 1983. Before then, the college and a small studio on-campus operating on the cable system of Riverton on channel 4. In the 70's most of the programming was in black and white. CWC had its own modulator so it could control when it was on or off the air with the cable system. At the time, the college was awarded the largest single federal grant to operate the PBS station, and with the studios located on the CWC campus, it opened the doors for an instructional laboratory for the college's broadcasting program. As part of its association with the college, Wyoming PBS broadcast telecourses for the college for many years, even before they were popular in the education community.

=== KCWC-FM ===
KCWC-FM (88.1 FM "Rustler Radio") is Central Wyoming College's student-run radio station, playing mainly Top 40 music. It first went on the air in 1968 with a ten-watt transmitter, which was replaced with a 1000-watt model in 1976. The station played Jazz/Adult Alternative music for many years before switching to its current format in 2009.

=== Rustler Television ===
Rustler Television is a cable station with content created by Central Wyoming College's TV and Film students. It broadcasts on cable channel 189 in Riverton and Lander.

== Academics ==
Central Wyoming College offers approximately forty programs, including Western American Studies; Outdoor Education; Fire Science; International Studies; and Environment, Health and Safety; which make use of the college's historic and geographic location. However, the college is probably best known for its two-year nursing program. In addition to undergraduate degrees, Central Wyoming College also offers various certifications, e.g. automotive technology, GIS, and welding. Central Wyoming College is accredited by the Higher Learning Commission, and its nursing program is accredited by the Accrediting Commission for Education in Nursing.

The college has a focus on career-technical (applied) programs specifically for students looking to immediately enter the job market, although it also has numerous academic transfer programs for students planning to continue on for bachelor and advanced degrees. Central Wyoming College has articulation agreements with schools that include the University of Wyoming (which maintains an on-campus outreach center), NOLS, Chadron State College, and the North Dakota University System. Additionally, Central Wyoming College offers non-credit professional, personal development, and community-oriented courses.

CWC has a Board of Cooperative Higher Educational Services (BOCHES) that enables prepared high school students to earn college credit through a dual and concurrent enrollment program. Also, the college has been awarded federal Gear Up, Upward Bound and Educational Talent Search grants, ensuring pre-college age students in CWC's service area have more opportunities for higher education.

== Notable alumni ==
- Liz Bangerter – Montana State Representative, District 80
- Jack Bradford – actor and theatre director
- Hayden Dalton (born 1996) - basketball player for Hapoel Holon of the Israeli Basketball Premier League
- Patrick Goggles – former Wyoming State Representative, District 33
- Martin T. Rucker – former Missouri State Representative, District 29
