= Tod Strike =

- Born: Brisbane, Queensland, Australia

Tod Strike is an actor, singer and musical theatre performer best known as being one of the original members of The Ten Tenors.

== Theatre ==
Year	Title	Role	Other notes
2000	Joseph and the Amazing Technicolor Dreamcoat	Joseph	Directed by Robbie Parkin (Harvest Rain Theatre Company)
2011	Love Never Dies	Ensemble, Phantom & Raoul Understudy	Directed by Simon Phillips
2013	Assassins	Giuseppe Zangara	Directed by Tyran Parke
2014	Hair	Berger	Directed by Robbie Carmellotti (StageArt)
