= Steven Tandy =

Australian actor

Steven Tandy (born 23 October 1952) is an Australian stage, television and film actor. He is best known for playing Tom Sullivan, the second eldest son in the classic Australian television series The Sullivans.

== Biography ==
After graduating from the National Institute of Dramatic Art (NIDA) in 1971, Tandy landed the role in the Australian television series The Sullivans. Since then he has appeared often in film and stage roles. For thirteen years he played the role of Commodore Lassard in the Police Academy Stunt Show at Warner Bros. Movie World on the Gold Coast, Queensland. He returned to NIDA in 1995 to study directing.

== Filmography ==
Year	Title	Role	Director
1994	Rough Diamonds	Roger Bright	Donald Crombie
2003	Gettin' Square	Warren Halliwell	Jonathan Teplitzky
2014	Talking Back at Thunder	Phillips	Este Heyns and Aaron Davison

== Television ==
Year	Title	Role	Notes
1975	The Unisexers	Julian 'Tinsel' Tinsley	
1976	The Sullivans	Tom Sullivan	
1986	Sons & Daughters	Bill Sanders	Season 6
2006	H_{2}O: Just Add Water	Mr Hendrix	Season 1, episode 13 – "Shipwrecked"
2006	Mortified	Mr. McClusky	
2014	Secrets & Lies	Kevin Gresham	
2016	The Family Law	Security Guard	1 episode
2022	Young Rock	Classic Freddie Blassie	4 episodes

== Theatre ==
Year	Title	Role	Director and theatre
2004	Dad's Army	Warden Hodges	Peter Williams (Twelfth Night Theatre, Twin Towns)
2004	The Rocky Horror Show	The Narrator	Tony Allcock (On The Boards Theatre Company)
2005	Dad's Army	Warden Hodges	Chris Betts (Bruce Mason Centre, Auckland, New Zealand)
2005	Mack and Mabel	Mack Sennett	Joan Stalker-Brown (Javeenbah)
2005	Run for Your Wife	Detective Sergeant Porterhouse	Peter Farago (Twelfth Night Theatre)
2006	Last Drinks	Marvin McNulty	Ian Lawson (La Boite Theatre)
2007	'Allo 'Allo!	Colonel Kurt von Strohm	Peter Farago (Twelfth Night Theatre)
2007	Summer Wonderland		Ian Lawson (La Boite Theatre)
2009	25 Down	Gary	Jon Halpin (Queensland Theatre)
2010	Jesus Christ Superstar	Herod	Tim O'Connor (Harvest Rain Theatre Company)
2012	The Wizard of Oz	The Wizard	Tim O'Connor (Harvest Rain Theatre Company)
2017	Noises Off	Selsdon Mowbray	Sam Strong (Melbourne Theatre Company and Queensland Theatre)

== Awards and nominations ==
=== Stage awards ===
- 2006 – Won Gold Matilda Award for Best Actor in Last Drinks (play by Shaun Charles, based on Andrew McGahan's novel)
