= Carols in the City =

Christmas concert in Brisbane, Australia

Carols in the City (also known as IGA Lord Mayor's Carols in the City), is an annual free Christmas concert event held at Riverstage in Brisbane, Australia. It is currently held on the second Saturday in every December. The event is broadcast on the Nine Network across Queensland.

== History ==
The event was broadcast on the Nine Network from the 1970s until 2010. It was then on Network Ten for 2011 until 2013, returning to Nine in 2014. For a time it was a major supporter of the Royal Flying Doctor Service of Australia. It was also run by the City Tabernacle Baptist Church.

== Past and current performers ==
The concert features many established, as well as up and coming talent.

- Jack Vidgen
- Guy Sebastian
- Stan Walker
- Marina Prior
- Troy Cassar-Daley
- Paulini
- Dean Geyer
- Julie Anthony
- The Idea of North
- James Morrison
- Emma Pask
- Colin Buchanan
- Karen Knowles
- Jason Barry-Smith
- Harvest Rain Theatre Company
- Wurrawhy
- Lauren Porter
- Justice Crew

== Sponsors ==
- IGA
- Brisbane City Council
- RACQ
- Village Roadshow Theme Parks and Attractions
- Myer
- World Vision Australia
- Smart Business Services
- Lyndons
- Churches of Christ in Australia
- Hammered Silver Recording Studios
- Brisbane Concert Lighting
- CPC production Services
- Deep Blue Events
- City Tabernacle Baptist Church
- North Coast Joinery

== Charity partner ==
Royal Flying Doctor Service of Australia

== Media partners ==
- The Sunday Mail
- 4BC
- 4BH
- Nine Network
