= Liz Bangerter =

American politician

Liz Bangerter (born 1974) was a Republican member of the Montana House of Representatives.

Bangerter was elected to the Montana House of Representatives in 2010. Bangerter is a member of the Church of Jesus Christ of Latter-day Saints. She attended Central Wyoming College. She also has a certificate in medical office technology from the University of Montana-Helena College of Technology. Bangerter and her husband Carl are the parents of three daughters.

Moffie Funk (D), a Helena teacher defeated Bangerter in the November General Election of 2014.

== Sources ==
- Mormon Times, Feb. 5, 2011.
- "Project Vote Smart" entry for Bangerter
- Bangerter's campaign bio
- Helena Independent Record October 14, 2010
