= A Time for Us (Luke Kennedy album) =

Studio album by Luke Kennedy
- Released: 12 July 2013
- Recorded: 2013
- Label: Universal

Singles from Luke Kennedy
- 1. "Stay For a Minute" Released: 5 July 2013

A Time for Us is the debut studio album by Australian recording artist Luke Kennedy, who finished second on the second season of The Voice Australia. The album was released on 12 July 2013, through Universal Music Australia. It features eight songs Kennedy performed on The Voice, two original songs, as well as two newly recorded covers.

== Singles ==
- "Stay for a Minute" – Released on 5 July 2013. It did not reach the Aria Charts top 100.

== Track listing ==
No.	Title	Length
1.	""Un giorno per noi (A Time for Us)"" (Cover)	2:42
2.	"I Dreamed a Dream" (Cover)	2:52
3.	"Time To Say Goodbye" (Cover)	4:05
4.	"Please Don't Ask Me" (Cover)	3:25
5.	"Freedom 90" (Cover)	5:05
6.	"Overjoyed" (Cover)	3:47
7.	"Caruso"	2:54
8.	"Love is Gone"	4:12
9.	"Stay For A Minute"	3:03
10.	"Goodbye Yellow Brick Road" (Cover)	3:09
11.	"In My Life"	2:45

== Charts ==
Chart (2013)	Peak position
ARIA Albums Chart	6

== Release history ==
Region	Date	Format	Label
Australia	12 July 2013	CD, digital download	Universal Music Australia
