= Troughton =

Troughton is a surname, and may refer to

- Alice Troughton, British film and television director, not related to Patrick Troughton
- Bob Troughton (1904–1988), Australian rules footballer
- Charles Troughton (1916–1991), British businessman
- David Troughton (born 1950), English actor and son of Patrick Troughton
- Edward Troughton (1753–1835), British instrument maker
- Ellis Le Geyt Troughton (1893–1974), Australian zoologist
- Jim Troughton (born 1979), English cricketer and grandson of Patrick Troughton
- Lionel Troughton (1879–1933), English cricketer
- Michael Troughton (born 1955), English actor and son of Patrick Troughton
- Patrick Troughton (1920–1987), English actor best known for his role in Doctor Who
- Sam Troughton (born 1977), English actor and grandson of Patrick Troughton
- Sammy Troughton (born 1964), Northern Irish footballer
- William Troughton (born 1984), English actor and grandson of Patrick Troughton

== See also ==
- Troughton & Simms, company founded by Edward Troughton
- Cooke, Troughton & Simms, the same company post-merger
