= Jack Bradford =

American actor and theatre director

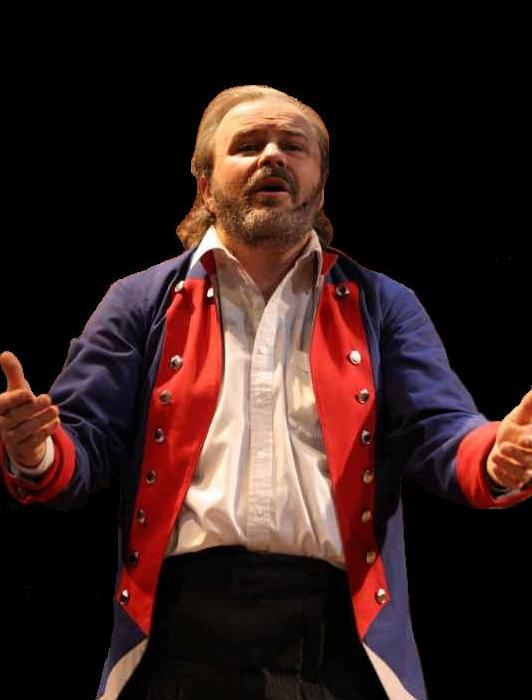
- Bradford as Jean Valjean in Les Misérables
- Born: July 26, 1959 (age 66); Milton, Florida
- Years active: 1975–present

Jack Bradford (born July 26, 1959) is an American / Australian stage actor and director. He is best known in Brisbane for founding Brisbane Junior Theatre which presented its first production The Pirates of Penzance in April 2001.

Bradford, the son of Gerald and Rose Bradford, was born in 1959 at Milton, Florida, in the USA. His father was a Navy captain, which meant that Jack and his seven siblings were regularly on the move.

His first stage role was Jesus in Godspell working alongside Kathy Najimy in 1975.

Upon completion of a Bachelor of Arts in theatre, he moved to Brisbane, Australia in 1988.

Jack was married to Australian Deborah Onions, whom he had met on a visit to Australia in 1986. From 1989 to 1993, he was the senior pastor of the Christian Praise Centre in Glen Innes, New South Wales.

In 1993, Jack, Debbie and their three boys moved back to Brisbane, which is where they currently reside.

== Stage ==
Year	Title	Role	Location
1975	Godspell	Jesus	Helix Summer Theatre, La Mesa CA. alongside Kathy Najimy
1976	The Roar of the Greasepaint	Cocky	Monte Vista High School. Director Ron Ray.
1977	Kiss Me, Kate	Hortensio	Grossmont College Summer Theatre, El Cajon CA.
1977	Equus	Alan, Strang	Grossmont College, El Cajon CA. working alongside John Castellanos
1978	Sweet Charity	Herman	Cajon Performing Arts Center
1979	The Roar of the Greasepaint	Cocky	Patio Playhouse, Escondido, CA.
1979	How to Succeed in Business	Bert Bratt	Grossmont College Summer Theatre, El Cajon, CA.
1979	Zoo Story	Director, Jerry	Central Wyoming College
1979	All the World's a Stage	Writer, editor and principal	Central Wyoming College. (A Shakespearean Review).
1980	Butterflies are Free	Donny Dark, Set and Light Designer	Central Wyoming College.
1980	Camelot	Arthur	Central Wyoming College.
1980	My Partner and Olio by Bartley Campbell	Sam Bowler, Imperial Players	Cripple Creek, Colorado. Professional Summer Stock, 150 Performances.
1983	Waiting for Lefty	Irv	Wright State University, Professional Actors Training Company, Ohio.
1983	Two by Two	Japheth	Dayton Playhouse, Ohio.
1984	Equus	Dalton	Wright State University, Professional Actors Training Company, Ohio (with George Grizzard.)
1984	Kiss Me, Kate	Petruchio, Fred	Dayton Playhouse, Ohio.
1984	Princess Ida	Cyril	Center Stage, Yellow Springs, Ohio.
1984	Royal Hunt of the Sun	De Candia	Fairborn Playhouse, Ohio.
1985	Amadeus	Baron Van Swieten	Wright State University, Professional Actors Training Company, Ohio.
1985	Annie	Director	Fairborn Playhouse, Ohio.
1985	Antigone	Creon	Yellow Springs Amphitheater, Ohio.
1989	Godspell	Jesus	Ballarat Light Opera Company, Ballarat Victoria Australia.
1995	Man of La Mancha	Sancho	Harvest Rain Theatre Company, Brisbane Australia.
1996	Godspell	Director	Harvest Rain Theatre Company, Brisbane Australia.
1997	Joseph and the Amazing Technicolor Dreamcoat	Director	Harvest Rain Theatre Company, Brisbane Australia.
1999	Guys and Dolls	Nicely Nicely Johnson	Harvest Rain Theatre Company, Brisbane Australia.
1999	The Importance of Being Earnest	Director	Harvest Rain Theatre Company, Brisbane Australia.
2000	Godspell	Director	Harvest Rain Theatre Company, Brisbane Australia.
2001	Bye Bye Birdie	Harry MacAfee	Harvest Rain Theatre Company, Brisbane Australia.
2001	Oliver	Director	Harvest Rain Theatre Company, Brisbane Australia.
2002	Les Misérables	Jean Valjean	Savoyards Theatre Company, Brisbane Australia. Winner of the 2002 4MBS Perform Award for best actor in a musical.
2002	Wit	Director	La Boite Theatre D-Lab, Brisbane Australia.
2002	The Music Man	Harold Hill	Queensland Musical Theatre, Brisbane Australia.
2004	West Side Story	Director	Savoyards Theatre Company, Brisbane Australia.
2004	Wit	Director	Bunbury Theatre Company, Brisbane Australia. In the 2004 Matilda Awards Caroline Kennison was a joint winner of Best Female Actor in a lead role for her role as Professor Vivian Bearing.
2004	Arsenic and Old Lace	Teddy Brewster	Harvest Rain Theatre Company, Brisbane Australia.
2005	Les Misérables	Jean Valjean	Ignatians Theatre Company, Brisbane Australia.
2006	Rent	Director and Joint Producer	Schonell Theatre, University of Queensland Brisbane Australia.
2006	Parade	Tom Watson, Old Soldier	Warehaus Theatre, Brisbane Australia.
2006	Godspell	Jesus, director and joint producer	Schonell Theatre, University of Queensland Brisbane Australia.
2007	Children of Eden	Father	Harvest Rain Theatre Company, Brisbane Australia.
2007	The Witches of Eastwick	Director and joint producer	Schonell Theatre, University of Queensland Brisbane Australia.
2008	The Importance of Being Earnest	Director	Starlight Theatre, Centre Stage Spring Hill, Brisbane Australia.
2008	Songs for a New World	Director (Qld Premiere)	Starlight Theatre, Centre Stage Spring Hill, Brisbane Australia.
2008	Proof	Robert (professor)	Starlight Theatre, Centre Stage Spring Hill, Brisbane Australia.
2008	Suds	Director (Australian Premiere)	Starlight Theatre, Centre Stage Spring Hill, Brisbane Australia.
2009	An Ideal Husband	Earl of Caversham	Starlight Theatre, Centre Stage Spring Hill, Brisbane Australia.
2009	Sweeney Todd	Sweeney Todd	Starlight Theatre, Centre Stage Spring Hill, Brisbane Australia.
2009	Speed the Plow	Charlie Fox	Starlight Theatre, Centre Stage Spring Hill, Brisbane Australia.
2009	Forbidden Broadway	Director	Starlight Theatre, Centre Stage Spring Hill, Brisbane Australia.
2010	Fiddler on the Roof	Director, Tevye	Starlight Theatre, Centre Stage Spring Hill, Brisbane Australia.
2010	13	Director	Starlight Theatre, Centre Stage Spring Hill, Brisbane Australia.
2010	How to Succeed in Business Without Really Trying	Director, J.B. Biggley	Starlight Theatre, Centre Stage Spring Hill, Brisbane Australia.
2015	The Prince of Egypt	Director, Jethro	Albany Hills Christian Church, Brisbane Australia.

== Brisbane Junior Theatre productions ==
Year	School Holiday	Title	Location
2001	Easter	1. The Pirates of Penzance	RiverCity Family Church, The Gap
2001	September	2. Joseph and the Amazing Technicolor Dreamcoat	RiverCity Family Church, The Gap
2002	Easter	3. H.M.S. Pinafore	RiverCity Family Church, The Gap
2002	September	4. Annie	RiverCity Family Church, The Gap
2003	Easter	5. The Mikado	Centenary Uniting Church, Middle Park
2003	July	6. The Pirates of Penzance	Bracken Ridge Baptist Church
2003	September	7. Guys and Dolls	Centenary Uniting Church, Middle Park
2004	July	8. Joseph and the Amazing Technicolor Dreamcoat	Bracken Ridge Baptist Church
2004	September	9. Fiddler on the Roof	Bracken Ridge Baptist Church
2005	June–July	10. The King and I	Bracken Ridge Baptist Church
2005	September	11. The Music Man	Bracken Ridge Baptist Church
2006	July	12. Aladdin	Bracken Ridge Baptist Church with performances at Redcliffe Cultural Centre
2006	September	13. Guys and Dolls	Clontarf Baptist Church with performances at Redcliffe Cultural Centre
2007	January	14. Oklahoma	Albany Hills Christian Church, Warner
2007	Easter	15. Joseph and the Amazing Technicolor Dreamcoat	Albany Hills Christian Church, Warner
2007	July	16. Mulan	Albany Hills Christian Church, Warner
2007	September	17. Fiddler on the Roof	Albany Hills Christian Church, Warner
2008	January	18. Cinderella	Albany Hills Christian Church, Warner
2008	January	19. Into the Woods	Centre Stage Theatre, Spring Hill
2008	Easter	20. Alice in Wonderland	Albany Hills Christian Church, Warner
2008	July	21. Annie	Albany Hills Christian Church, Warner
2008	September	22. Once Upon a Mattress	Albany Hills Christian Church, Warner
2009	January	23. Aladdin	Albany Hills Christian Church, Warner
2009	January	24. H.M.S. Pinafore	Centre Stage Theatre, Spring Hill
2009	Easter	25. King and I	Albany Hills Christian Church, Warner
2009	July	26. Beauty and the Beast	Albany Hills Christian Church, Warner
2009	September	27. High School Musical	Albany Hills Christian Church, Warner
2010	January	28. High School Musical 2	Albany Hills Christian Church with performances at Ferny Grove High School Theatre
2010	Easter	29. The Pirates of Penzance	Albany Hills Christian Church with performances at Centre Stage Theatre, Spring Hill
2010	June–July	30. Mulan	Albany Hills Christian Church with performances at Centre Stage Theatre, Spring Hill
2010	September	31. Seussical	Albany Hills Christian Church, Warner
2011	January	32. Oklahoma!	Albany Hills Christian Church, Warner
2011	June	33. The Music Man	Albany Hills Christian Church, Warner
2011	September	34. Thoroughly Modern Millie	Albany Hills Christian Church, Warner
2012	January	35. Guys and Dolls	Albany Hills Christian Church, Warner
2012	Easter	36. Joseph and the Amazing Technicolor Dreamcoat	Albany Hills Christian Church, Warner
2012	June	37. State Fair	Albany Hills Christian Church, Warner
2012	September–October	38. Les Misérables	Albany Hills Christian Church, Warner
2013	January	39. Alice in Wonderland	Albany Hills Christian Church, Warner
2013	April	40. Fiddler on the Roof	Albany Hills Christian Church, Warner
2013	June	41. Beauty and the Beast	Albany Hills Christian Church, Warner
2013	September	42. Honk!	Albany Hills Christian Church, Warner
2013	September–October	43. 13 the musical	Albany Hills Christian Church, Warner
2014	January	44. Aladdin	Albany Hills Christian Church, Warner
2014	April	45. Godspell	Albany Hills Christian Church, Warner
2014	July	46. The Little Mermaid	Albany Hills Christian Church, Warner
2014	September	47. Peter Pan	Albany Hills Christian Church, Warner
2014	September–October	48. The Pirates of Penzance	Mueller Community Church, Rothwell
2015	January	49. The Sound of Music	Albany Hills Christian Church, Warner
2015	April	50. Annie	Albany Hills Christian Church, Warner
2015	June–July	51. Hairspray	Albany Hills Christian Church, Warner
2015	October	52. The Wizard of Oz	Mueller College, Rothwell
2015	October	53. You're a Good Man, Charlie Brown	Mueller College, Rothwell
2016	January	54. Legally Blonde	Albany Hills Christian Church, Warner
2016	March–April	55. My Son Pinocchio	Albany Hills Christian Church, Warner
2016	June–July	56. Thoroughly Modern Millie	Albany Hills Christian Church, Warner
2016	September–October	57. Singing in the Rain	Mueller College, Rothwell
2017	January	58. Shrek	Albany Hills Christian Church, Warner
2017	April	59. The Sound of Music	Albany Hills Christian Church, Warner
