= Naomi Price =

Australian stage actress and singer

- Born: Brighton, England
- Occupations: Actress, artistic director
- Years active: 2006–present

Naomi Price is a British stage actress and singer, best known for her work as Artistic Director of The Little Red Company and appearing in the fourth season of the Australian version of The Voice, finishing in fifth place.

== History ==
Price moved from England to Australia to study at Queensland University of Technology in 2003. Since moving to Brisbane, she appeared in numerous productions including Into the Woods, Children of Eden, Alice, The Awfully Big Adventures of Peter Pan, Rent, Jesus Christ Superstar and Tell Me on a Sunday. She made her professional debut in The Wishing Well for La Boite Theatre. In 2007, Price played the role of Cathy in Jason Robert Brown's The Last Five Years co-starring The Voice Australia season 2 runner-up Luke Kennedy. She has performed alongside Ricky Martin, Tim Finn, Guy Sebastian, Kate Miller-Heidke, Troy Cassar-Daley and Broadway composer Scott Alan.

Price founded The Little Red Company with Adam Brunes in 2012 and together they have created original productions Rumour Has It, Wrecking Ball, Lady Beatle, Christmas Actually, There's Something About Music, Skyfall and Sisters Are Doing It For Themselves which have toured nationally and internationally.

She made her debut with Queensland Theatre Company in their 2014 production of Gloria. Price also auditioned for season 4 of The Voice Australia. She was mentored by Ricky Martin throughout the series and placed 6th overall.

Price was part of the Australian cast of Beautiful: The Carole King Musical as understudy for the role of Carole's friend and fellow songwriter Cynthia Weil.

In 2025, Price will take on the title role in Queensland Theatre's production of Calamity Jane.

The Voice performances and results (2015)
| Episode | Song | Original Artist | Result |
|---|---|---|---|
| Audition | "Rolling in the Deep" | Adele | Through to Battle Rounds |
| Battle Rounds | "Break Free" | Ariana Grande | Given a Fast Pass, through to the live shows |
| Battle Rounds | "Defying Gravity" | Idina Menzel | Through to live shows |
| Live show 1 | "Don't Cry for Me Argentina" | Madonna | Saved by coach |
| Live show 2 | "Too Darn Hot" | Major Lazer | Saved by public |
| Live show 3 | "Marry The Night" | Lady Gaga | Bottom four |
| Semi Final Part 1 | "The Winner Takes It All" | ABBA | Saved by public |
| Semi Final Part 2 | "A House Is Not a Home" | Cher | Eliminated |

== Live performances ==
| Year | Title | Role | Notes |
|---|---|---|---|
| 2015 | Ladies in Black | Fay | Directed by Simon Phillips (Queensland Theatre Company) |
| 2015 | Rumour Has It | Adele | Created and produced by the little red company with Queensland Theatre Company |
| 2014 | Gloria | Maggie | Directed by David Bell (Queensland Theatre Company) |
| 2014 | Wrecking Ball | Miley Cyrus | Created and produced by the little red company |
| 2013 | Rumour Has It | Adele | Created and produced by the little red company |
| 2012 | Women In Voice | Naomi | Produced by the Judith Wright Centre |
| 2012 | Rumour Has It | Adele | Created and produced by the little red company |
| 2012 | The Class of 69 | Petula Clark | Produced by Tony Grace (Harbour Agency) |
| 2012 | Macbeth | Lady Macbeth | Directed by Ross Balbuziente (shake & stir theatre company) |
| 2012 | Romeo and Juliet | Juliet/Tybalt | Directed by Ross Balbuziente (shake & stir theatre company) |
| 2012 | Hamlet | Gertrude/Ophelia/Player | Directed by Ross Balbuziente (shake & stir theatre company) |
| 2008 | The Wishing Well | Sarah / Bella / Lily / Jilly | Directed by Michael Futcher (La Boite Theatre) |

== Awards and nominations ==
=== Australian Women in Music Awards ===
The Australian Women in Music Awards is an annual event that celebrates outstanding women in the Australian Music Industry who have made significant and lasting contributions in their chosen field. They commenced in 2018.

| Year | Nominee / work | Award | Result | Ref. |
|---|---|---|---|---|
| 2023 | Naomi Price | Live Creative Production Award | Won | |
