= KCWC-FM =

- Riverton, Wyoming; United States
- Frequency: 88.1 MHz

Programming
- Format: Contemporary hit radio

Ownership
- Owner: Central Wyoming College

History
- First air date: October 7, 1974

Technical information
- Licensing authority: FCC
- Facility ID: 10030
- Class: C2
- ERP: 3,000 watts
- HAAT: 442 meters (1,450 ft)
- Transmitter coordinates: 42°34′58.8″N 108°42′38.4″W
- Translator: 102.3 K272BI (Mountain View)

Links
- Public license information: Public file; LMS
- Webcast: Listen live
- Website: cwc.edu/radio

KCWC-FM (88.1 FM) is a radio station broadcasting a contemporary hit radio format. Licensed to Riverton, Wyoming, United States, the station is owned by Central Wyoming College.

== History ==
The station went on the air as KCWC-FM on October 7, 1974. The transmitter was located on the science building on the campus of Central Wyoming College. It was initially only broadcasting with 10 watts. In 1977 the station moved its transmitter and increased its power to 3,000 watts.

In 1982, the station again moved its transmitter and increased its height above the average terrain, allowing it to be heard farther.

In January 2009, the name of the station, as well as its format, were changed. KCWC-FM became "Rustler Radio", with a Top 40/contemporary hits sound instead of its previous jazz/adult alternative format.

The station is non-commercial and frequently does public service announcements, many of which are produced by its live on air DJs and student employees. Students at the school can take classes regarding KCWC, which allows them to create their own shows and learn the day-to-day operations of radio broadcasting.

KCWC-FM shares facilities with Wyoming PBS on the campus of Central Wyoming College. KCWC-FM has been nominated for awards in the past, and was considered one of the most listed to radio stations in Fremont County.

The station has a translator, K272BI, broadcasting to Mountain View, Wyoming, on 102.5 FM.

== See also ==
- Campus radio
- List of college radio stations in the United States
