= Whodunnit (play) =

1977 play by Anthony Shaffer

Whodunnit? is a play written by Anthony Shaffer in 1977, originally called The Case of the Oily Levantine.

== Plot summary ==
Whodunnit? is a comedy / mystery play. The first act follows the traditional conventions of a country house mystery with an assortment of suspects, but in the second act it becomes apparent that nobody is truly what they seem.

== Act 1 ==
A collection of characters apparently drawn directly from old English detective fiction arrive for a party in an old country house. Among them there is an old Navy man, a ditzy woman, and a flamboyantly eccentric butler who keeps trying to serve up his own cocktail creation, the "Zombie Whammy". There is also Andreas Capodistriou, a smooth talking serpent of a man who demonstrates to each guest in turn that he knows something compromising about them and is intent on blackmailing each one.

The act climaxes as each guest, having a reason to want Capodistriou dead, conceals his or her self on the set to lie in wait for the victim, who arrives alone and kneels to perform his evening prayer. As he does so, a collection of sword-wielding hands appear around him. One blade falls, removing his head, and the curtain falls.

== Act 2 ==
The act opens on an incongruous scene. Policemen in modern dress mingle with the archaically dressed guests. They are investigating the murder that ended the first act. The old Navy man sneezes and loses his fake mustache in the process. He reveals that he is actually an actor, and was hired to participate in a role-playing party for the house's owner, who would act as detective and solve the mystery. It transpires that all of the "guests", and the butler, are also hired actors. The entire affair has been orchestrated in order to murder the man who played "Capodistriou". This in turn is revealed to be Gerry Marshall, a theatrical agent who held the contracts of all the actors except the one playing the host, with whom he had a different relationship. Each actor hated Marshall, but all deny knowing it was him playing Capodistriou. The organizer of the party was apparently Marshall himself. It is up to Inspector Bowden to unravel the tangle of relationships, real and unreal, to unmask the killer.

== Cast of characters ==
Cast of characters.

- Dame Edith Runcible, an eccentric archaeologist
- Lady Tremurrain, a dotty aristocrat
- Archibald Perkins, the butler
- Silas Bazeby, a respectable family lawyer
- Rear-Admiral Knatchbull Folliatt, an old sea dog
- Roger Dashwell, a black sheep
- Inspector Bowden, an unconventional Scotland Yard detective
- Andreas Capodistriou, an oily Levantine
- sergeant, a stolid copper
- Lavinia Hargreaves, a sweet young thing

== West End production ==
An earlier version of the play, under the title The Case of the Oily Levantine, opened at Her Majesty's Theatre on 13 September 1979. The designer was Hayden Griffin and the director was Patrick Dromgoole, with costumes by Anne Sinclair and lighting by Howard Eaton. The cast was as follows:

- Andreas Capodistriou - Hywel Bennett
- Archibald Perkins - Wolfe Morris
- Dame Edith Runcible - Gwen Nelson
- Lady Tremurrain - Anna Quayle
- Lavinia Hargreaves - Adrienne Posta
- Rear Admiral Knatchbull Folliatt - William Squire
- Roger Dashwell - Paul Angelis
- Sergeant - Roger Leach
- Silas Bazeby - Bernard Archard

== Broadway production ==
The Broadway production of Whodunnit? began previews at the Biltmore Theatre on 14 December 1982. After 19 previews, it opened on 30 December 1982. It closed on 15 May 1983 after 157 performances.

The production credits for opening night were as follows:

- Michael Kahn – director
- Patricia Zipprodt – costume designer
- Andrew Jackness – scenic designer
- Martin Acronstein – lighting designer
- Richard Fitzgerald – sound designer
- Patrik D. Moreton – hair and make-up designer
- Douglas Urbanski, Robert A. Buckley and E. Gregg Wallace, Jr. – producers

The opening night cast was as follows:

- Dame Edith Runcible – Hermione Baddeley
- Lady Tremurrain – Barbara Baxley
- Archibald Perkins – Gordon Chater
- Silas Bazeby – Jerome Dempsey
- Rear-Admiral Knatchbull Folliatt – Ronald Drake
- Roger Dashwell – John Glover
- Inspector Bowden – Fred Gwynne
- Andreas Capodistriou – George Hearn
- sergeant – Jeffrey Alan Chandler
- Lavinia Hargreaves – Lauren Thompson
