= Harvest Rain Theatre Company =

Australian theatre company

Harvest Rain Theatre Company was a not-for-profit theatre company based in Brisbane, Australia. Beginning as an amateur company, it evolved into a professional musical theatre company presenting arena productions around Australia, before closing in 2022.

== Early history ==
Harvest Rain began in 1985 as a small drama group in New Farm, Queensland, Australia. The founding members of the company were the brothers Robbie Parkin and David Parkin and the husband and wife team Chris Crooks and Judy Crooks. The name "Harvest Rain" was chosen because Chris Crooks liked the word "harvest" and the team felt that the word "rain" softened it. The company initially staged a range of amateur productions and the shows featured a small ensemble of dedicated actors, operating out of the Sydney Street Theatre in New Farm.

In 2008 the company moved to the Mina Parade Warehouse in Alderley and began presenting all its mainhouse productions at QPAC.

== Professional productions ==
In 2012, the company announced that it was in the final stages of transitioning into becoming a fully professional musical theatre company, the first of its kind in Queensland. Harvest Rain produced Oklahoma! in 2013 as its first fully professional production.

In 2014, the company's first fully professional season included Guys and Dolls starring Ian Stenlake and Daryl Somers, Spamalot starring Jon English, Simon Gallaher, Frank Woodley and Julie Anthony, and an arena production of Cats starring Marina Prior and featuring over 500 performers on stage, making it the largest production of Cats ever staged in the southern hemisphere.

In 2014, the company moved its training, rehearsals, and administration to a building on the north side of Brisbane known as the Hayward Street Studios.

Spamalot won Harvest Rain the Matilda Award for Best Musical or Cabaret in 2014.

In 2015, the company produced The Pirates of Penzance to celebrate QPAC's 30th birthday. The show starred Andrew O'Keefe, John Wood and Nancye Hayes and featured Billy Bourchier as Frederic and Georgina Hopson as Mabel, in their professional debut. The production was directed by Simon Gallaher.

In 2016, Harvest Rain presented an arena production of Hairspray in Brisbane, Adelaide and Newcastle, with a cast featuring Lauren McKenna, Simon Burke, Christine Anu, Tim Campbell, Wayne Scott Kermond and Amanda Muggleton. An arena production of Grease followed, performed in Brisbane, Newcastle and Adelaide in 2017, Sydney, Melbourne, Canberra, Perth and Brisbane again, in 2018. In 2019, an arena production of The Wizard of Oz toured Brisbane, Adelaide and Newcastle in 2019 and Sydney in 2020.

== Closure of the company ==
The company closed in November 2022.

Multiple media outlets reported that O'Connor and his partner had been charged with sex offences against children.

== Notable people ==
Notable people associated with the company include:

=== Crew and staff ===
- Jack Bradford, theatrical director, 1996–1997, 1999–2001
- Simon Gallaher, company chair, 2012–2015
- Tim O'Connor, administrator, theatrical director, CEO

=== Cast ===
- Jack Bradford, 1995, 1999, 2001, 2004, 2007, roles in multiple productions
- Tim Campbell, 2017, Johnny Casino in Grease the Arena Experience
- Mark Conaghan, 1999, 2005, roles in multiple productions
- Julie Eckersley, 1999, in Much Ado About Nothing
- Jon English, 2014, King Arthur in Spamalot
- Michael Falzon, 2009, in Joseph and the Amazing Technicolour Dreamcoat
- Simon Gallaher, 2012 in Hairspray, 2014, in Spamalot
- David Knijnenburg, 1999–2001, 2005, 2007, roles in multiple productions
- Tod Strike, 2000, Joseph in Joseph And The Amazing Technicolor Dreamcoat
- Daryl Somers, 2014, Nicely Nicely Johnson in Guys and Dolls.
- Steven Tandy, 2010, 2012, roles in multiple productions
- John Wood, 2019, The Wizard in "The Wizard of Oz"
