= Tim O'Connor (theatre director) =

Australian theatre director, producer, and playwright

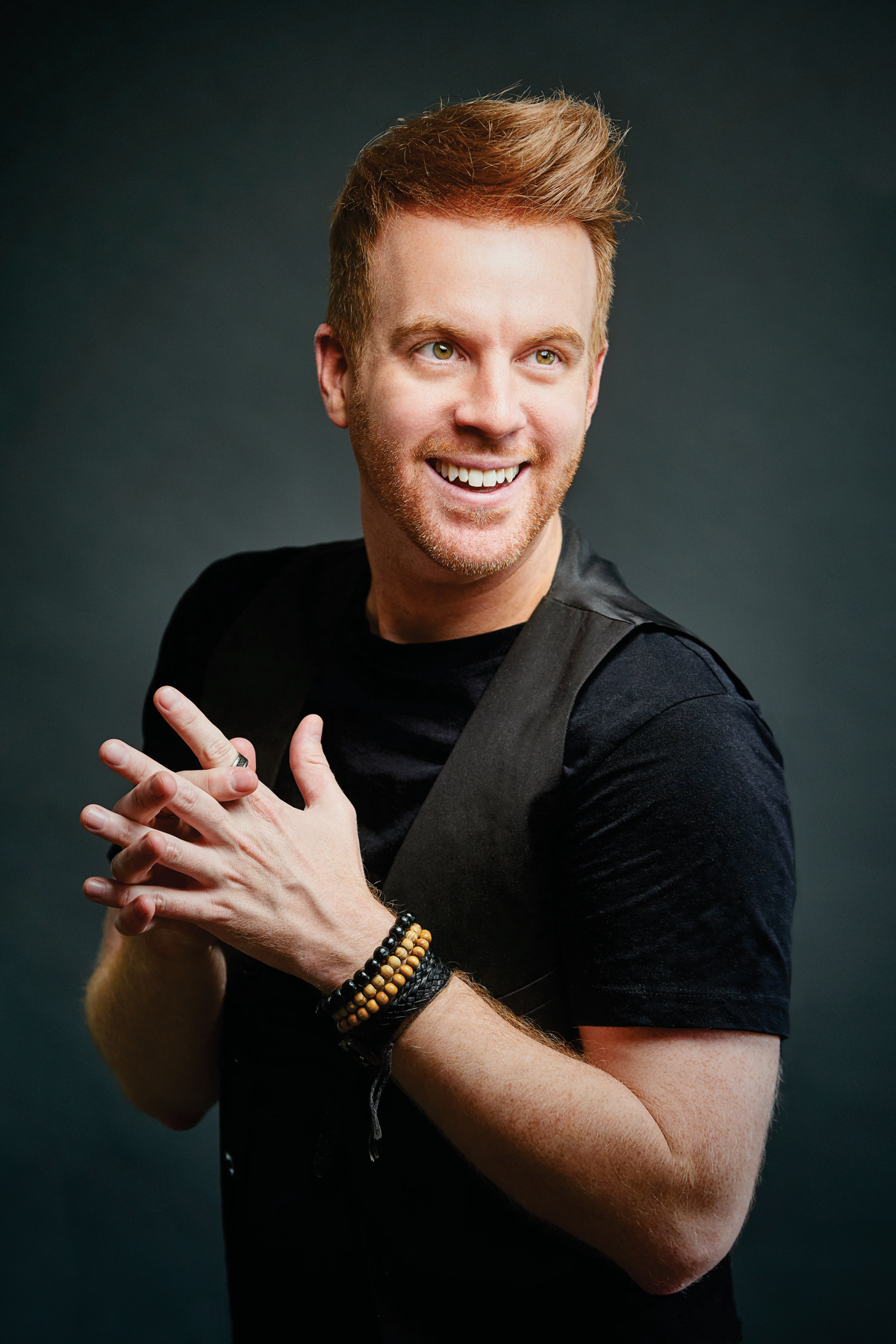
- O'Connor in 2019
- Born: Timothy Noel O'Connor; 13 September 1981 (age 44); Brisbane, Australia
- Occupations: Theatre director, theatrical producer, playwright, author
- Years active: 1993–2022

Timothy Noel O'Connor (born 13 September 1981) is an Australian theatre director, producer, and playwright.

== Career ==
When O'Connor finished school he volunteered in the office at Harvest Rain Theatre Company for three years. He was eventually employed and became more involved in administrative work. His first paid directors role was for a community play at Harvest Rain.

Since 2004, O'Connor was the artistic director of the Harvest Rain Theatre Company and subsequently became the CEO. The company, rebranded as AVT Live, closed in 2022 after multiple allegations of sexual crimes indicated Tim as the perpetrator.

He has directed Harvest Rain productions of musicals such as Jesus Christ Superstar, Hairspray, Oklahoma!, and Spamalot, as well as writing, directing, and producing the world premiere stage adaptation of The Neverending Story.

O'Connor founded the Brisbane Academy of Musical Theatre. Harvest Rain also ran Youth Theatre Workshops and the Australian Musical Theatre Workshop which hosted workshops and masterclasses in Brisbane and regional centres.

== Awards ==
In 2011, O'Connor won a Groundling Award for Outstanding Contribution to the Queensland Theatre Industry. In 2012 he was nominated for Brisbane's person of the year. In 2014, he won a Gold Matilda Award for his work with Harvest Rain and was also nominated for Best Director for Spamalot.

== Personal life ==
In November 2022, O'Connor was arrested and charged with multiple sex offences against children and young adults.
