= List of films shot on the Gold Coast =

The following is a list of films shot wholly or partly on the Gold Coast, Queensland, Australia. The Gold Coast is a popular location for the filming of Hollywood movies and high-budget Australian movies. The City of the Gold Coast has also emerged as a growing hub for independent feature film production between 2009 and 2019 by content creators living and working in the region.

== Films ==
Year	Film	Locations	Ref.
1935	Heritage	Barambah, Canungra	
1949	Sons of Matthew	Beaudesert, Natural Bridge, Numimbah Valley	
1972	Morning of the Earth	Kirra Beach, Coolangatta	
1975	Surrender in Paradise	Gold Coast (including Surfers Paradise)	
1978	In Search of Anna	Surfers Paradise	
1980	Final Cut	Surfers Paradise	
1981	Airhawk (Star of the North)	Gold Coast (including Surfers Paradise)	
1983	Bush Christmas (Prince and the Great Race)	Beaudesert, Rathdowney	
1983	Goodbye Paradise	Surfers Paradise, Southport, Currumbin (including Currumbin Wildlife Sanctuary)	
1984	The Coolangatta Gold	Gold Coast (including Coolangatta & Surfers Paradise)	
1987	The Odd Angry Shot	Land Warfare Centre (Canungra)	
1989	The Delinquents	Warner Brothers Studios, Oxenford	
1990	Blood Oath (Prisoners of the Sun)	Village Roadshow Studios, Oxenford	
1992	Hurricane Smith	Gold Coast, Village Roadshow Studios, Oxenford	
1992	Over the Hill	Gold Coast	
1993	Fortress	Village Roadshow Studios, Oxenford	
1993	Reckless Kelly	Village Roadshow Studios, Oxenford	
1994	Escape from Absolom (No Escape)	Village Roadshow Studios, Oxenford, Canungra Army Base, Land Warfare Centre – Department of Defence, Warner Roadshow Movie World Studios	
1994	Muriel's Wedding	Coolangatta, Elanora, Surfers Paradise Tugun, Tweed Heads	
1994	Street Fighter	Gold Coast (including Village Roadshow Studios, Oxenford)	
1995	Mighty Morphin Power Rangers: The Movie	Village Roadshow Studios, Oxenford	
1996	First Strike (Police Story 4)	Gold Coast	
1996	The Phantom	Village Roadshow Studios, Oxenford	
1997	The Real Macaw	Mount Tamborine, Stradbroke Island	
1999	Chameleon II: Death Match	Gold Coast (including Warner Roadshow Movie World Studios)	
1999	The Craic	Surfers Paradise	
1999	Komodo	Cape Moreton, Gold Coast	
1999	Chameleon 3: Dark Angel	Gold Coast (including Warner Roadshow Movie World Studios)	
2000	Pitch Black	Village Roadshow Studios, Oxenford, Surfers Paradise	
2000	Walk the Talk	Broadbeach, Surfers Paradise, Mermaid Beach, Palm Beach	
2001	Crocodile Dundee In Los Angeles	Village Roadshow Studios, Oxenford	
2001	Cubbyhouse (Hellion)	Gold Coast	
2001	Driven	Gold Coast Indy	
2001	Hildegarde	Gold Coast (including Coolangatta)	
2002	Blurred	Gold Coast (including Surfers Paradise)	
2002	The Crocodile Hunter: Collision Course	Gold Coast hinterland, Brisbane City Hall	
2002	Ghost Ship	Village Roadshow Studios, Oxenford, Moreton Bay	
2002	Scooby Doo	Village Roadshow Studios, Oxenford, Tangalooma (Moreton Island)	
2003	Darkness Falls	Village Roadshow Studios, Oxenford	
2003	George of the Jungle 2	Gorge Falls in Tallebudgera Valley, Gold Coast Airport, Conrad Jupiters Hotel & Casino	
2003	Gettin' Square	Southport (including Southport District Court & Australia Fair Shopping Centre), 2 Corporate Ct, Bundall	
2003	Peter Pan	Gold Coast (including Village Roadshow Studios, Oxenford)	
2003	Tempted (Returning Lily)	Gold Coast (including Village Roadshow Studios, Oxenford)	
2004	Bondi Tsunami	Gold Coast	
2005	The Great Raid	Village Roadshow Studios, Oxenford, Tallebudgera Valley, Tamborine Mountain	
2005	House of Wax	Village Roadshow Studios, Oxenford	
2006	Aquamarine	Village Roadshow Studios, Oxenford, Tallebudgera Creek, Sea World, Palm Beach, Burleigh Heads	
2006	Kokoda	Mount Tamborine	
2006	The Marine	Village Roadshow Studios, Oxenford, Bond University, Robina, Surfers Paradise	
2006	See No Evil	Village Roadshow Studios, Oxenford	
2007	The Condemned	Village Roadshow Studios, Oxenford, Mount Tamborine	
2007	Heyy Babyy	Dreamworld, Coomera	
2007	Unfinished Sky	Beaudesert (including Wyambin homestead)	
2008	Fool's Gold	Moreton Bay, Village Roadshow Studios, Oxenford	
2008	Nim's Island	Village Roadshow Studios, Oxenford, Gorge Falls in Tallebudgera Valley	
2008	The Ruins	Village Roadshow Studios, Oxenford, Mount Tamborine, Natural Arch (Springbrook)	
2009	Beauty and the Beast	Village Roadshow Studios, Oxenford	
2009	Daybreakers	Village Roadshow Studios, Oxenford, Robina railway station	
2009	Triangle	Raby Bay Marina, Southport Yacht Club, Southport Spit	
2010	The Chronicles of Narnia: The Voyage of the Dawn Treader	Village Roadshow Studios, Oxenford, South Stradbroke Island, The Southport School, Doug Jennings Park, Southport	
2010	Jucy	Ephraim Island, Gold Coast	
2011	The Railway Man	Gold Coast hinterland, Village Roadshow Studios, Oxenford	
2011	Sanctum	Village Roadshow Studios, Oxenford, Jacobs Well	
2012	Bad Karma	Village Roadshow Studios, Oxenford	
2012	Bait 3D	Village Roadshow Studios, Oxenford, Coolangatta Beach, ALDI Coolangatta	
2012	Iron Sky	Warner Roadshow Studios, Oxenford	
2012	Return to Nim's Island	Village Roadshow Studios, Oxenford, Magnetic Island	
2014	The Inbetweeners 2	Southport, Wet'n'Wild, Oxenford, Village Roadshow Studios, Oxenford	
2014	My Mistress	Currumbin Valley	
2014	Schapelle	Tugun, Southport Yacht Club	
2014	Unbroken	Village Roadshow Studios, Oxenford	
2015	The Fear of Darkness	Village Roadshow Studios, Oxenford, Bond University, Robina	
2015	Pirates of the Caribbean: Dead Men Tell No Tales	Helensvale, Southport, Maudsland, Village Roadshow Studios, Oxenford	
2015	San Andreas	Village Roadshow Studios, Oxenford, The Pines Shopping Centre Elanora, Outback Spectacular carpark, Oxenford, Bond University, Robina	
2015	StalkHer	Gold Coast (including Village Roadshow Studios, Oxenford)	
2016	Kong: Skull Island	Village Roadshow Studios, Oxenford, North Stradbroke Island, South Stradbroke Island, Mount Tamborine	
2016	Resident Evil: The Final Chapter	Village Roadshow Studios, Oxenford	
2016	The Shallows	Mount Tamborine, Village Roadshow Studios, Oxenford	
2017	Aquaman	Village Roadshow Studios, Oxenford, Main Beach, Coomera, Southport, North Stradbroke Island	
2017	Jungle	South East Queensland, Gold Coast hinterland (including Mount Tamborine & Bonogin Valley), Village Roadshow Studios, Oxenford	
2017	Pacific Rim: Uprising	Broadbeach, Southport, Surfers Paradise, Bulwer Island	
2017	Pirates of the Caribbean: Dead Men Tell No Tales	Village Roadshow Studios, Oxenford, The Spit, Southport	
2017	Thor: Ragnarok	Mount Tamborine (including Cedar Creek Falls), Village Roadshow Studios, Oxenford	
2018	Danger Close: The Battle of Long Tan	Village Roadshow Studios, Oxenford	
2018	Guardians of the Tomb	Village Roadshow Studios, Oxenford	
2019	Dora and the Lost City of Gold	Village Roadshow Studios, Oxenford, Gold Coast, Tamborine Mountain, Tallebudgera Valley, Palm Beach Currumbin State High School, Coomera River	
2019	Occupation: Rainfall	Helensvale, Mount Tamborine	
2020	6 Festivals	Main Beach, Lunar Electric Music Festival (Gold Coast)	
2020	Love and Monsters (Monster Problems)	Coombabah	
2020	Swimming for Gold	Tallebudgera Creek	
2021	Godzilla vs. Kong	Village Roadshow Studios, Oxenford, Tallebudgera Valley, Miami State High School, Roosevelt Lounge Broadbeach	
2021	The Possessed	Pinnacle Studios, Helensvale	
2021	You, Me and the Penguins	Gold Coast	
2022	Black Site	Pinnacle Studios Helensvale, Gold Coast	
2022	The Curious Case of Dolphin Bay	Snapper Rocks, Coolangatta, Mount Tamborine	
2022	Elvis	Village Roadshow Studios, Oxenford, Burleigh Heads	
2022	Spiderhead	Gold Coast Convention Centre, Gold Coast hinterland (including Hinze Dam, Advancetown & Tallebudgera Valley)	
2022	Thirteen Lives	Yatala, Mudgeeraba, Numinbah Valley, Carrara, Village Roadshow Studios, Oxenford	
2022	Ticket To Paradise	Village Roadshow Studios, Miami Beach, North Burleigh Hill, Home of the Arts, Tamborine Mountain (Curtis Falls), Griffith University, Southport, Tangalooma, Moreton Island	
2023	Bring Him to Me	Gold Coast	
2023	Land of Bad	Gold Coast hinterland (including Hinze Dam, Advancetown, Tallebudgera Valley, Springbrook National Park, Springbrook Plateau & The Pines Elanora)	
2023	The Portable Door	Pinnacle Studios, Helensvale, Miami Beach, Natural Bridge at Springbrook National Park	
2023	True Spirit	Village Roadshow Studios, Oxenford, Surfers Paradise	
2024	Audrey	Home of the Arts (HOTA), Gold Coast Turf Club, Southport State High School, Southport and Coomera TAFE, Sanctuary Cove, Robina, Nerang Bicentennial Hall	
2024	Eden	Village Roadshow Studios, Oxenford	
2024	Godzilla x Kong: The New Empire	Village Roadshow Studios, Oxenford	
2024	How to Make Gravy	Village Roadshow Studios, Oxenford, Gold Coast, Jacob's Well	
2024	Land of Bad	Gold Coast, Hinze Dam, Advancetown, Tallebudgera Valley, Guanaba Gorge, Springbrook National Park, Springbrook Plateau	
2024	Scurry	Gold Coast (including Sparke Film Studios)	
2025	Anaconda	Tallebudgera Valley, Tamborine Mountain, Springbrook National Park, Village Roadshow Studios, Oxenford	
2025	Beast of War	Village Roadshow Studios, Oxenford	
2025	Dangerous Animals	Gold Coast	
2025	Primitive War	Gold Coast	
2025	Spit	Gold Coast	
2026	Balls Up	Village Roadshow Studios, Oxenford, Tamborine Mountain, Robina Stadium	
2026	The Bluff	Village Roadshow Studios, Oxenford, Tamborine Mountain, North Stradbroke Island	
2026	The Get Out (Bear Country)	Gold Coast (including Village Roadshow Studios, Oxenford)	
2026	Love on Deck	Gold Coast, K'gari, Hervey Bay	
2026	Mortal Kombat II	Village Roadshow Studios, Oxenford, Pinnacle Studios, Helensvale, Tamborine Mountain, Hope Island	
2026	The Mosquito Bowl	Gold Coast hinterland, Pimpama Island & Districts Community Centre	
2026	Posthumous	Pinnacle Studios, Helensvale	
2026	Runner	Marine Parade, Labrador, Carrara	
2026	Spa Weekend	Gold Coast (including Sheraton Grand Mirage, Southport & Village Roadshow Studios, Oxenford)	
2027	Gundam	Gold Coast (including Village Roadshow Studios, Oxenford)	
TBA	Allen	Gold Coast	
TBA	Bluefly	Gold Coast	
TBA	Godzilla x Kong: Supernova	Village Roadshow Studios, Oxenford	
TBA	Headless	Gold Coast	
TBA	Honeymoon with Harry	Rainbow Bay Surf Lifesaving Club	
TBA	Jump	Gold Coast, Tamborine Mountain	
TBA	The Mark	Currumbin (including Currumbin Bridge & Currumbin Beach Vikings Surf Life Saving Club), Pinnacle Studios, Helensvale	
TBA	Subversion	Village Roadshow Studios, Oxenford	
TBA	Untitled Mike Thornton biopic film	Village Roadshow Studios, Oxenford	
TBA	Voltron	Village Roadshow Studios, Oxenford	
TBA	Zombie Plane	Gold Coast	

== See also ==
- Australian Film Commission
- Cinema of Australia
- Film Australia
- Screen Australia
- Screen NSW
- Screen Queensland
- Screen Queensland Studios
- Screen Tasmania
- South Australian Film Corporation
- Tasmanian Film Corporation
- Queensland Film Corporation
- VicScreen
- Village Roadshow Studios
- World cinema
- List of Australian films
- List of films set in Australia
- List of films shot in Adelaide
- List of films and television shows shot in Alice Springs
- List of films shot in Brisbane
- List of films shot in Melbourne
- List of films shot in the Northern Territory
- List of films shot in Queensland
- List of films shot in Sydney
- List of films shot in Tasmania
- List of films shot in Western Australia
- Television shows set on the Gold Coast, Queensland
