= List of films shot in Queensland =

The following is a list of films shot wholly or partly in Queensland, Australia.

== Films ==
Year	Title	Locations	Ref
1921	The Raiders	8km from Indooroopilly railway station	
1921	Retribution	Boggo Road Gaol, Queen Street, Brisbane	
1926	Greenhide	Walloon Station in the Dawson Valley, Oxford House (Ann St, Brisbane), Indooroopilly	
1926	The Moth of Moonbi	Franklyn Vale Cattle Station, Spicers Peak / Spicers Gap (including Governors Chair lookout), Fitzroy Vale, Mount Castle, at the foot of The Sleeping Assyrian in the Rosevale Valley, Brisbane (including Teneriffe House, Ascot Racecourse, Newmarket Saleyards and Brisbane River)	
1927	The Kid Stakes	Rockhampton	
1935	Heritage	Barambah, Canungra	
1936	Uncivilised	North Queensland (including Palm Island)	
1936	White Death	Great Barrier Reef (including Hayman Island)	
1938	Typhoon Treasure	North Queensland, Great Barrier Reef (including Green Island)	
1949	Sons of Matthew	Beaudesert, Natural Bridge, Numinbah Valley, Lamington Plateau, Christmas Creek, Running Creek, Rathdowney	
1954	The Back of Beyond	Birdsville (including Birdsville Track)	
1954	King of the Coral Sea	Thursday Island, Green Island	
1969	Age of Consent	Brisbane (including Albion Park racecourse), Dunk Island, Purtaboi Island	
1972	Morning of the Earth	Kirra Beach, Coolangatta	
1975	Surrender in Paradise	Brisbane, Gold Coast (including Surfers Paradise)	
1976	Eliza Fraser	Fraser Island, Mornington Island	
1977	The Deep	Great Barrier Reef	
1977	The Mango Tree	Bundaberg, Gayndah, Mount Perry, Cordalba	
1978	In Search of Anna	Surfers Paradise	
1978	The Irishman	Charters Towers	
1980	Final Cut	Surfers Paradise	
1980	Touch and Go	Sunshine Coast (including Maroochydore & Noosa Heads)	
1981	Airhawk (Star of the North)	Gold Coast (including Surfers Paradise), Queensland outback	
1982	The Little Feller (The Other Woman)	Brisbane (including St Lucia, Indooroopilly & Upper Mount Gravatt)	
1982	Turkey Shoot (Escape 2000 or Blood Camp Thatcher)	Cairns	
1983	Buddies	Emerald	
1983	Bush Christmas (Prince and the Great Race)	Beaudesert, Rathdowney	
1983	Goodbye Paradise	Surfers Paradise, Southport, Currumbin (including Currumbin Wildlife Sanctuary)	
1984	The Coolangatta Gold	Gold Coast (including Coolangatta & Surfers Paradise)	
1984	The Settlement	Marburg, Samford, Rosewood (St Brigid's Church), Ipswich	
1985	Burke & Wills	Burke's Grave near Innamincka at Cooper Creek	
1985	The Naked Country	Charters Towers	
1986	Australian Dream	Brisbane (including Carseldine & Space City shopping centre at Kallangur)	
1986	Crocodile Dundee	McKinlay	
1986	The Fringe Dwellers	Cherbourg, Murgon	
1987	Contagion	Brisbane	
1987	Dark Age	Cairns	
1987	Frenchman's Farm	Brisbane, Beaudesert	
1987	Jilted	Fraser Island	
1987	The Odd Angry Shot	Canungra (including Land Warfare Centre)	
1987	Travelling North	Port Douglas	
1988	Evil Angels (A Cry in the Dark)	Mount Isa	
1989	Dead Calm	The Whitsundays	
1989	The Delinquents	Brisbane (including Park Royal Hotel), Maryborough (including Customs House Hotel & Excelsior City Band Hall), Bundaberg (including Palais Theatre), Warner Brothers Studios, Oxenford	
1990	Bloodmoon	Brisbane, Redcliffe, Marist College Ashgrove	
1990	Blood Oath (Prisoners of the Sun)	Village Roadshow Studios, Oxenford	
1992	Hurricane Smith	Brisbane, Gold Coast, Village Roadshow Studios, Oxenford	
1992	Over the Hill	Glass House Mountains, Rainbow Beach, Gold Coast	
1992	Redheads	Brisbane	
1993	Bedevil	Charleville, Bribie Island	
1993	Broken Highway	Port of Brisbane (including Bishop Island in the Fisherman Islands), Moreton Bay	
1993	Fortress	Village Roadshow Studios, Oxenford	
1993	Reckless Kelly	Gold Coast	
1993	Sniper	Port Douglas, Paronella Park, Kuranda, Drumsara Sugar Plantation	
1994	Escape from Absolom (No Escape)	Cairns (including Barron Falls), Lake Tinaroo (Atherton Tableland), Port Douglas, Mossman, Innisfail, Gold Coast (including Village Roadshow Studios, Oxenford), Canungra Army Base, Land Warfare Centre – Department of Defence & Warner Roadshow Movie World Studios)	
1994	Muriel's Wedding	Coolangatta, Elanora, Surfers Paradise Tugun, Tweed Heads, Hamilton Island	
1994	Rough Diamonds	Boonah, Toogoolawah	
1994	Street Fighter	Village Roadshow Studios, Oxenford	
1994	Traps	Far North Queensland (including Innisfail & Cassowary Coast)	
1995	Mighty Morphin Power Rangers: The Movie	Village Roadshow Studios, Oxenford	
1995	Tunnel Vision	Brisbane	
1996	First Strike (Police Story 4)	Gold Coast	
1996	The Island of Dr. Moreau	Cairns, Bramston Beach, Mossman Gorge	
1996	The Phantom	Village Roadshow Studios, Oxenford, Brisbane (including Brisbane City Hall & Manor Apartment Hotel)	
1997	Beverly Hills Family Robinson	Far North Queensland	
1997	Mr. Nice Guy	Fortitude Valley	
1997	Paradise Road	Port Douglas, Cairns (Trinity Inlet), Atherton Tableland, Raffles Hotel	
1997	The Real Macaw	Brisbane CBD (including King George Square, Old Customs Office, Riverside Place, ANZAC Square & Brisbane City Hall), Brisbane Airport, Mount Tamborine, Stradbroke Island	
1998	Chameleon	Brisbane (Tennyson Powerhouse)	
1998	The Thin Red Line	Daintree Rainforest, Bramston Beach, Mossman, Cairns, Port Douglas	
1999	Chameleon II: Death Match	Gold Coast (including Warner Roadshow Movie World Studios)	
1999	City Loop (Bored Olives)	Brisbane (including West End & Yeronga)	
1999	The Craic	Surfers Paradise	
1999	Komodo	Cape Moreton, Brisbane, Gold Coast (including Village Roadshow Studios, Oxenford)	
1999	Paperback Hero	Nindigully (including Nindigully Pub), Brisbane (including Morrison Hotel, Woolloongabba)	
2000	Chameleon 3: Dark Angel	Gold Coast (including Warner Roadshow Movie World Studios)	
2000	Pitch Black	Gold Coast (including Village Roadshow Studios, Oxenford, Surfers Paradise)	
2000	Walk the Talk	Gold Coast (including Broadbeach, Surfers Paradise, Mermaid Beach & Palm Beach)	
2001	Crocodile Dundee In Los Angeles	Village Roadshow Studios, Oxenford	
2001	Cubbyhouse (Hellion)	Gold Coast (including Rainbow Bay)	
2001	Driven	Gold Coast Indy	
2001	He Died with a Felafel in His Hand	Brisbane (including 2 Taylor St Annerley & Taringa)	
2001	Hildegarde	Gold Coast (including Coolangatta)	
2002	Blurred	Brisbane, Surfers Paradise	
2002	The Crocodile Hunter: Collision Course	Gold Coast hinterland, Brisbane City Hall	
2002	Ghost Ship	Village Roadshow Studios, Oxenford, Newstead, Moreton Bay	
2002	Scooby-Doo	Village Roadshow Studios, Oxenford, Tangalooma (Moreton Island), Tennyson Power Station	
2003	Darkness Falls	Village Roadshow Studios, Oxenford	
2003	George of the Jungle 2	Gorge Falls in Tallebudgera Valley, Gold Coast Airport, Conrad Jupiters Hotel & Casino, Broadbeach	
2003	Gettin' Square	Southport (including Southport District Court & Australia Fair), 2 Corporate Ct, Bundall, Maryborough Correctional Centre, Fortitude Valley	
2003	Inspector Gadget 2	Brisbane (including South Bank Parklands, University of Queensland, Queensland Parliament House, William Jolly Bridge, ANZAC Square & Brisbane City Hall)	
2003	Paradise Found	Port Douglas	
2003	Peter Pan	Gold Coast (including Village Roadshow Studios, Oxenford)	
2003	Swimming Upstream	Spring Hill Baths	
2003	Tempted (Returning Lily)	Gold Coast (including Village Roadshow Studios, Oxenford)	
2003	Undead	Woodford	
2004	Big Reef	Cooktown, Queensland	
2004	Bondi Tsunami	Sunshine Coast (including Aussie World, Palmview & The Big Pineapple, Woombye), Gold Coast	
2004	Loop the Loop (Up and Down)	Brisbane	
2005	The Great Raid	Village Roadshow Studios, Oxenford, Bribie Island, Tallebudgera Valley, Tamborine Mountain, North Queensland	
2005	House of Wax	Village Roadshow Studios, Oxenford	
2005	The Proposition	Winton	
2006	48 Shades	Brisbane (including Brisbane Boys' College, Kangaroo Point, Story Bridge & Rosalie)	
2006	Aquamarine	Village Roadshow Studios, Oxenford, Tallebudgera Creek, Sea World, Palm Beach, Burleigh Heads, Shorncliffe	
2006	Kokoda	Mount Tamborine	
2006	The Marine	Village Roadshow Studios, Bond University, Robina, Surfers Paradise, Brisbane (including Waterfront Place), Gladstone, Townsville	
2006	See No Evil	Village Roadshow Studios, Oxenford	
2007	All My Friends Are Leaving Brisbane	Brisbane (including New Farm, Paddington, Kangaroo Point, Brookfield, Toowong, Story Bridge & Royal Exchange Hotel)	
2007	The Condemned	Village Roadshow Studios, Oxenford, Mount Tamborine, Brisbane (including Boggo Road Gaol)	
2007	Gone	Longreach, Winton	
2007	Heyy Babyy	Brisbane (including Exchange Hotel), Dreamworld, Coomera	
2007	Unfinished Sky	Beaudesert (including Wyambin homestead), Boonah, Fassifern Valley, Brisbane (including Story Bridge)	
2008	Acolytes	Glass House Mountains, Redcliffe	
2008	Australia	Bowen, Darling Downs	
2008	Fool's Gold	Hamilton Island, Port Douglas (including Central Hotel), Lizard Island, Airlie Beach, Hervey Bay, Cairns, Fraser Island, Moreton Bay, Village Roadshow Studios, Brisbane (including Queensland University of Technology, St Mary's Anglican Church, Brisbane City Botanic Gardens)	
2008	The Horseman	Burpengary	
2008	Nim's Island	Village Roadshow Studios, Oxenford, Gorge Falls in Tallebudgera Valley, Hinchinbrook Island, Bowen, Port Douglas	
2008	The Ruins	Village Roadshow Studios, Oxenford, Mount Tamborine, Natural Arch (Springbrook)	
2009	Beauty and the Beast	Gold Coast (including Village Roadshow Studios, Oxenford)	
2009	Charlie & Boots	Emerald (including Emerald Botanic Gardens), Rubyvale, Cape York Peninsula	
2009	Daybreakers	Village Roadshow Studios, Oxenford, Robina railway station, Brisbane (including Riparian Plaza & New Farm)	
2009	In Her Skin	Brisbane	
2009	Subdivision	Hervey Bay	
2009	Triangle	Queensland Maritime Museum (HMAS Diamantina), Raby Bay Marina, Southport Yacht Club, Southport Spit	
2010	Beneath Hill 60	Townsville	
2010	The Chronicles of Narnia: The Voyage of the Dawn Treader	Village Roadshow Studios, Oxenford, Cleveland Point, South Stradbroke Island, The Southport School, Doug Jennings Park, Stapylton Quarry	
2010	Jucy	Brisbane (including West End, The Gap, Paddington, New Farm), Ephraim Island, Gold Coast	
2010	The Reef	Hervey Bay, Bowen, Lady Elliot Island	
2010	Savages Crossing	Ipswich	
2010	The Tree	Boonah	
2010	Uninhabited	Masthead Island, Capricorn Coast	
2011	Come and Get Me	Sunshine Coast, Brisbane, Eudlo Forest	
2011	The Killage	Sunshine Coast, Ewen Maddock Dam Recreation Centre	
2011	Sanctum	Village Roadshow Studios, Oxenford, Muggy Beach on Dunk Island, Jacobs Well	
2011	Sinbad and the Minotaur	Glass House Mountains	
2012	Bad Karma	Village Roadshow Studios, Oxenford	
2012	Bait 3D	Village Roadshow Studios, Oxenford, Coolangatta Beach, ALDI Coolangatta	
2012	Daddy's Little Girl	Sunshine Coast	
2012	Iron Sky	Warner Roadshow Studios, Oxenford	
2012	Mabo	Rosewood Hotel	
2012	Return to Nim's Island	Village Roadshow Studios, Oxenford, Magnetic Island	
2013	The Railway Man	Gold Coast hinterland, Village Roadshow Studios, Oxenford, North Ipswich Rail Yards	
2014	500 Miles	Rosewood Hotel, Tallegalla	
2014	Charlie's Farm	Gympie	
2014	The Inbetweeners 2	Southport, Wet'n'Wild, Oxenford, Village Roadshow Studios, Oxenford	
2014	My Mistress	Currumbin Valley, Village Roadshow Studios, Oxenford	
2014	Unbroken	Village Roadshow Studios, Oxenford, Fort Lytton	
2014	Schapelle	Tugun, Southport Yacht Club	
2015	The Fear of Darkness	Village Roadshow Studios, Oxenford, Bond University, Robina, Lake Moogerah	
2015	The Pack	Glenorie Station (near Toowoomba)	
2015	San Andreas	Village Roadshow Studios, Oxenford, The Pines Shopping Centre Elanora, Outback Spectacular carpark, Bond University, Robina, Brisbane (including Myer Centre carpark), Tenthill Creek Rd Gatton, Lockyer Valley, Quarry Rd Stapylton, Ipswich	
2015	StalkHer	Gold Coast (including Village Roadshow Studios, Oxenford)	
2016	Broke		
2016	Kong: Skull Island	Village Roadshow Studios, Oxenford, North Stradbroke Island, South Stradbroke Island, Mount Tamborine	
2016	Lost & Found	Rockhampton	
2016	Resident Evil: The Final Chapter	Village Roadshow Studios, Oxenford	
2016	The Shallows	Mount Tamborine, Village Roadshow Studios, Oxenford	
2017	Aquaman	Village Roadshow Studios, Oxenford, Main Beach, Coomera, Southport, North Stradbroke Island	
2017	Australia Day	Brisbane (including Camp Hill, William Jolly Bridge, Yeerongpilly railway station, Montague Rd in West End, Darra & Rocklea)	
2017	Don't Tell	Ipswich, Woodlands, Marburg, Toowoomba (including Picnic Point, Toowoomba)	
2017	Jungle	South East Queensland, Gold Coast hinterland (including Mount Tamborine & Bonogin Valley), Village Roadshow Studios, Oxenford	
2017	Pacific Rim: Uprising	Broadbeach, Southport, Surfers Paradise, Bulwer Island, Brisbane (including Eagle Street)	
2017	Pirates of the Caribbean: Dead Men Tell No Tales	Village Roadshow Studios, Oxenford, Cleveland Point, The Spit, Gold Coast, Maudsland, Whitehaven Beach, Haslewood Island, North Stradbroke Island	
2017	Thor: Ragnarok	Mount Tamborine (including Cedar Creek Falls), Village Roadshow Studios, Oxenford, Brisbane (including Mary Street, Albert Street, Margaret Street, Brisbane & Esk Lane)	
2018	Celeste	Far North Queensland (including Paronella Park, Mena Creek, Mena Creek Falls & Cassowary Coast)	
2018	Danger Close: The Battle of Long Tan	Village Roadshow Studios, Oxenford	
2018	The Film from Lot 15		
2018	Guardians of the Tomb	Village Roadshow Studios, Oxenford	
2019	Dora and the Lost City of Gold	Village Roadshow Studios, Oxenford, Tamborine Mountain, Tallebudgera Valley, Palm Beach Currumbin State High School, Coomera River, South Brisbane, Old Museum Building, Brisbane, Brisbane Airport	
2019	Occupation: Rainfall	Helensvale, Mount Tamborine	
2019	Two Heads Creek	Cracow	
2020	6 Festivals	Main Beach, Big Pineapple, Lunar Electric Music Festival (Gold Coast)	
2020	Black Water: Abyss	Brisbane (including Screen Queensland Studios, Hemmant), South East Queensland	
2020	Love and Monsters (Monster Problems)	Coombabah, Mount Cotton, Screen Queensland Studios, Hemmant	
2020	Romance on the Menu	Shorncliffe, Brisbane	
2020	Swimming for Gold	South Bank Parklands, South Bank Beach, Tallebudgera Creek	
2021	Christmas on the Farm	Brookfield	
2021	Godzilla vs. Kong	Village Roadshow Studios, Oxenford, Tallebudgera Valley, Miami State High School, Roosevelt Lounge, Broadbeach, Chinatown Mall Fortitude Valley, ULTIQA Rothbury Hotel, Masonic Temple, Brisbane, North Ipswich Railway Workshops, Bundamba Advanced Water Treatment Plant	
2021	Kidnapped	Port Douglas (Thala Beach Nature Reserve)	
2021	Perfect Messy Love	Moffat Beach, Caloundra	
2021	The Possessed	Pinnacle Studios, Helensvale	
2021	This Little Love of Mine	Cairns (including Palm Cove)	
2021	You, Me and the Penguins (Love and Penguins)	Brisbane (including Screen Queensland Studios, Hemmant & Eclectea Vintage Café, Brighton), Redcliffe, Gold Coast	
2022	Black Site	Pinnacle Studios Helensvale, Gold Coast	
2022	Elvis	Village Roadshow Studios, Oxenford, Burleigh Heads	
2022	The Curious Case of Dolphin Bay	Snapper Rocks, Cooolangatta, Mount Tamborine, Pullenvale	
2022	Spiderhead	Gold Coast Convention Centre, Gold Coast hinterland (including Hinze Dam, Advancetown & Tallebudgera Valley)	
2022	Thirteen Lives	Yatala, Gold Coast (including Village Roadshow Studios, Oxenford, Mudgeeraba, Numinbah Valley, Carrara & Griffith University Logan Campus), Brisbane Domestic Airport	
2022	Ticket To Paradise	Village Roadshow Studios, Oxenford, Miami Beach, North Burleigh Hill, Griffith University Southport, Home of the Arts, Surfers Paradise, Tamborine Mountain (Curtis Falls), Tangalooma, The Whitsundays (Manta Ray Bay, Qualia on Hamilton Island, Palm Bay Resort on Long Island), Brisbane City Hall, Centenary Pool Complex, Rainforest Gardens (Mount Cotton), Queen's Wharf construction site, Brisbane	
2022	We Are Still Here		
2023	13 Summers	Hervey Bay	
2023	Bring Him to Me	Brisbane, Ipswich, Gold Coast	
2023	Land of Bad	Gold Coast hinterland (including Hinze Dam, Advancetown, Tallebudgera Valley, Springbrook National Park, Springbrook Plateau & The Pines Elanora)	
2023	Love is in the Air	The Whitsundays, Airlie Beach, Whitsunday Coast Airport	
2023	The Portable Door	Pinnacle Films Studios, Brisbane Central Station, Queen Street Mall, Treasury Brisbane, Old Museum Building, Brisbane, Brisbane's Bank of NSW, Miami Beach, Natural Arch at Springbrook National Park	
2023	True Spirit	Village Roadshow Studios, Oxenford, Oxenford, Surfers Paradise	
2024	Audrey	Gold Coast (including Home of the Arts (HOTA), Gold Coast Turf Club, Southport State High School, Southport and Coomera TAFE, Sanctuary Cove, Robina & Nerang Bicentennial Hall)	
2024	Eden	Gold Coast (including Village Roadshow Studios, Oxenford)	
2024	Godzilla x Kong: The New Empire	Village Roadshow Studios, Oxenford	
2024	He Loves Me Not	K’gari (including Kingfisher Bay Resort)	
2024	How to Make Gravy	Village Roadshow Studios, Oxenford, Gold Coast, Jacob's Well	
2024	In the Room Where He Waits	Brisbane	
2024	Land of Bad	Gold Coast, Hinze Dam, Advancetown, Tallebudgera Valley, Guanaba Gorge, Springbrook National Park, Springbrook Plateau	
2024	The Red	Southern Queensland, Central Queensland (including Cracow), Brisbane (including Screen Queensland Studios, Hemmant)	
2024	Scurry	Gold Coast (including Sparke Film Studios)	
2024	Sharko (documentary film)	Brisbane (including Wynnum Manly Seagulls Football Club, Wynnum Manly Junior Football Club & Screen Queensland Studios, Hemmant)	
2024	You, Always	Far North Queensland, Screen Queensland Studios Cairns	
2025	Anaconda	Gold Coast (including Tallebudgera Valley, Tamborine Mountain, Springbrook National Park & Village Roadshow Studios, Oxenford)	
2025	Beast of War	Village Roadshow Studios, Oxenford	
2025	Dangerous Animals	Gold Coast	
2025	The Edge	Glass House Mountains, University of the Sunshine Coast	
2025	Fear Below	Goondiwindi, Macintyre River, Screen Queensland Studios, Brisbane	
2025	Primitive War	Gold Coast, Tamborine Mountain, Fort Lytton National Park	
2025	Spit	Gold Coast, Brisbane, Toowoomba, World Camp Quarantine Facility	
2026	All My Friends Are Back in Brisbane	Brisbane (including Wilsons Lookout in New Farm, West End & Brisbane CBD)	
2026	Allen	Brisbane (including Screen Queensland Studios, Hemmant), Gold Coast	
2026	Balls Up	Village Roadshow Studios, Oxenford, Tamborine Mountain, Robina Stadium, Brisbane City Hall, Fortitude Valley	
2026	The Bluff	Village Roadshow Studios, Oxenford, Tamborine Mountain, North Stradbroke Island	
2026	Fing!	Brisbane (including Screen Queensland Studios, Hemmant & Thomas Dixon Centre, West End)	
2026	The Get Out (Bear Country)	Gold Coast (including Village Roadshow Studios, Oxenford)	
2026	Love on Deck	Gold Coast, K'gari, Hervey Bay	
2026	Mortal Kombat II	Village Roadshow Studios, Oxenford, Pinnacle Studios, Helensvale, Tamborine Mountain, Hope Island	
2026	The Mosquito Bowl	Gold Coast (including Gold Coast hinterland, Pimpama Island & Districts Community Centre), Ipswich	
2026	Posthumous	Brisbane, Pinnacle Studios, Helensvale	
2026	Runner	Marine Parade, Labrador, Carrara, New Farm Park	
2026	Spa Weekend	Gold Coast (including Sheraton Grand Mirage, Southport & Village Roadshow Studios, Oxenford)	
2027	Gundam	Gold Coast (including Village Roadshow Studios, Oxenford)	
2027	The Most Wonderful Secret	Queensland	
TBA	Bull (working title)	Brisbane	
TBA	Bluefly	Gold Coast	
TBA	Godzilla x Kong: Supernova	Brisbane, Village Roadshow Studios, Oxenford	
TBA	Headless	Gold Coast	
TBA	Honeymoon with Harry	Brisbane (including Teneriffe & Chelmer), The Whitsundays, Rainbow Bay Surf Lifesaving Club	
TBA	Jump	Gold Coast, Tamborine Mountain	
TBA	The Mark	Currumbin, Currumbin Bridge, Currumbin Beach Vikings Surf Life Saving Club, Pinnacle Studios, Helensvale	
TBA	A Royal Wedding: A Royal In Paradise III	Brisbane (including Treasury Building), Redcliffe	
TBA	Subversion	Village Roadshow Studios, Oxenford, Brisbane (including Brisbane River & Rivergate Marina, Murarrie)	
TBA	Untitled Mike Thornton biopic film	Village Roadshow Studios, Oxenford	
TBA	Voltron	Village Roadshow Studios, Oxenford	
TBA	Wizards!	Far North Queensland (including Cairns, Cape Tribulation, Daintree Rainforest & Douglas Shire)	
TBA	Zombie Plane	Brisbane (including Screen Queensland Studios, Hemmant), Gold Coast, Caboolture Historical Village	

== See also ==
- Australian Film Commission
- Cinema of Australia
- Film Australia
- Screen Australia
- Screen Queensland
- Screen Queensland Studios
- Village Roadshow Studios
- Queensland Film Corporation
- World cinema
- List of Australian films
- List of films set in Australia
- List of films shot in Adelaide
- List of films and television shows shot in Alice Springs
- List of films shot in Brisbane
- List of films shot in Darwin
- List of films shot on the Gold Coast
- List of films shot in Melbourne
- List of films shot in Sydney
- List of films shot in Tasmania
- List of films shot in Western Australia
