= List of films shot in Brisbane =

The following is a list of films shot wholly or partly in Brisbane, Australia.

== Films ==
Film	Year	Locations	Ref
1921	The Raiders	8km from Indooroopilly railway station	
1921	Retribution	Boggo Road Gaol (Dutton Park), Queen Street (Brisbane CBD)	
1926	Greenhide	Oxford House (Ann Street, Brisbane CBD), Indooroopilly	
1926	The Moth of Moonbi	Teneriffe House, Ascot Racecourse, Newmarket Saleyards, Brisbane River	
1969	Age of Consent	Albion Park racecourse	
1975	Surrender in Paradise	Brisbane	
1982	The Little Feller (The Other Woman)	St Lucia, Indooroopilly, Upper Mount Gravatt	
1986	Australian Dream	Brisbane (including Carseldine & Space City shopping centre at Kallangur)	
1987	Contagion	Brisbane	
1989	The Delinquents	Brisbane (including Park Royal Hotel, Brisbane CBD)	
1990	Bloodmoon	Brisbane, Redcliffe, Marist College Ashgrove	
1992	Hurricane Smith	Brisbane	
1992	Redheads	Brisbane	
1993	Broken Highway	Port of Brisbane (including Bishop Island in the Fisherman Islands), Moreton Bay	
1994	Street Fighter		
1995	Tunnel Vision	Brisbane	
1996	First Strike (Police Story 4)	Chinatown (Fortitude Valley), Old Museum Building (Bowen Hills)	
1996	The Phantom	Brisbane City Hall, Manor Apartment Hotel (Brisbane CBD)	
1997	Mr Nice Guy	Fortitude Valley	
1997	The Real Macaw	Brisbane CBD (including King George Square, Old Customs Office, Riverside Place, ANZAC Square & Brisbane City Hall), Brisbane Airport, Stradbroke Island	
1998	Chameleon	Tennyson Power Station	
1999	City Loop (Bored Olives)	West End, Yeronga	
1999	Komodo	Cape Moreton, Brisbane	
1999	Paperback Hero	Morrison Hotel, Woolloongabba	
2001	He Died with a Felafel in His Hand	2 Taylor St Annerley, Taringa	
2002	Blurred	Brisbane	
2002	The Crocodile Hunter: Collision Course	Brisbane City Hall	
2002	Ghost Ship	Newstead, Moreton Bay	
2002	Scooby-Doo	Tennyson Power Station	
2003	Gettin' Square	Fortitude Valley	
2003	Inspector Gadget 2	Brisbane CBD (including South Bank Parklands, Queensland Parliament House, William Jolly Bridge, ANZAC Square & Brisbane City Hall), University of Queensland	
2003	Swimming Upstream	Spring Hill Baths	
2004	Loop the Loop (Up and Down)	Brisbane	
2006	Aquamarine	Shorncliffe	
2006	The Marine	Brisbane CBD (including Waterfront Place)	
2006	48 Shades	Brisbane Boys' College (Toowong), Kangaroo Point, Story Bridge, Rosalie	
2007	Heyy Babyy	Brisbane (including Exchange Hotel)	
2007	Unfinished Sky	Brisbane (including Story Bridge)	
2007	All My Friends Are Leaving Brisbane	New Farm, Paddington, Kangaroo Point, Brookfield, Toowong, Story Bridge, Royal Exchange Hotel)	
2007	The Condemned	Boggo Road Gaol (Dutton Park)	
2008	Fool's Gold	QUT, St Mary's Anglican Church, Kangaroo Point, Brisbane City Botanic Gardens	
2008	The Horseman	Burpengary, Brisbane	
2009	Daybreakers	Riparian Plaza (Brisbane CBD), New Farm	
2009	In Her Skin	Brisbane	
2009	Savages Crossing	Ipswich	
2009	Triangle	Queensland Maritime Museum / HMAS Diamantina (South Bank)	
2010	The Chronicles of Narnia: The Voyage of the Dawn Treader	Cleveland Point, Stapylton Quarry	
2010	Jucy	West End, The Gap, Paddington, New Farm	
2011	Come and Get Me	Brisbane	
2011	Sanctum	Jacobs Well	
2012	Iron Sky	Tribal Theatre (George Street, Brisbane CBD)	
2012	Tender		
2013	The Railway Man	Fort Lytton National Park	
2014	Unbroken	Fort Lytton	
2015	San Andreas	Myer Centre carpark (Brisbane CBD)	
2017	Pacific Rim: Uprising	Bulwer Island, Eagle Street (Brisbane CBD)	
2017	Pirates of the Caribbean: Dead Men Tell No Tales	Cleveland Point	
2017	Thor: Ragnarok	Brisbane CBD (including Mary Street, Albert Street, Esk Lane, Margaret Street)	
2019	The Brighton Miracle		
2019	Dora and the Lost City of Gold	South Brisbane, Old Museum Building, Bowen Hills, Brisbane Airport	
2020	Aiyai: Wrathful Soul		
2020	Black Water: Abyss	Brisbane (including Screen Queensland Studios, Hemmant)	
2020	Love and Monsters (Monster Problems)	Mount Cotton, Screen Queensland Studios, Hemmant	
2020	Romance on the Menu	Shorncliffe, Brisbane	
2020	Swimming for Gold	South Bank Parklands, South Bank Beach	
2021	Christmas on the Farm	Brookfield	
2021	Godzilla vs. Kong	Chinatown Mall Fortitude Valley, ULTIQA Rothbury Hotel, Masonic Temple, Brisbane	
2021	You, Me and the Penguins (Love and Penguins)	Screen Queensland Studios, Hemmant, Eclectea Vintage Café (Brighton), Redcliffe,	
2022	The Curious Case of Dolphin Bay	Pullenvale	
2022	Thirteen Lives	Yatala, Griffith University Logan Campus, Brisbane Domestic Airport	
2022	Ticket To Paradise	Brisbane CBD (including Queen's Wharf construction site & Brisbane City Hall), Centenary Pool Complex, Rainforest Gardens (Mount Cotton)	
2023	Bring Him to Me	Brisbane	
2023	The Portable Door	Brisbane CBD (including Brisbane Central Station, Queen Street Mall, Treasury Building & Brisbane’s Bank of NSW), Old Museum Building (Bowen Hills)	
2024	The Red	Brisbane (including Screen Queensland Studios, Hemmant)	
2024	Sharko (documentary film)	Wynnum Manly Seagulls Football Club, Wynnum Manly Junior Football Club, Screen Queensland Studios, Hemmant)	
2025	Fear Below	Screen Queensland Studios, Hemmant	
2026	All My Friends Are Back in Brisbane	Wilsons Lookout (New Farm), West End, Brisbane CBD	
2026	Balls Up	Brisbane City Hall, Fortitude Valley	
2026	Fing!	Screen Queensland Studios, Hemmant, Thomas Dixon Centre, West End	
2026	A Royal Wedding: A Royal In Paradise III	Brisbane (including Treasury Building), Redcliffe	
2026	Killer Whale		
2026	Posthumous	Brisbane	
2026	Runner	New Farm Park, Story Bridge	
2027	Godzilla x Kong: Supernova	Brisbane	
2027	Gundam	Brisbane	
TBA	Allen	Screen Queensland Studios, Hemmant	
TBA	Honeymoon with Harry	Teneriffe, Chelmer	
TBA	Zombie Plane	Brisbane (including Screen Queensland Studios, Hemmant)	
TBA	Bull (working title)	Brisbane	

== See also ==
- Australian Film Commission
- Cinema of Australia
- Film Australia
- Screen Australia
- Screen NSW
- Screen Queensland
- Screen Queensland Studios
- VicScreen
- Village Roadshow Studios
- Queensland Film Corporation
- Screen Tasmania
- South Australian Film Corporation
- Tasmanian Film Corporation
- World cinema
- List of Australian films
- List of films set in Australia
- List of films shot in Adelaide
- List of films and television shows shot in Alice Springs
- List of films shot on the Gold Coast
- List of films shot in Melbourne
- List of films shot in the Northern Territory
- List of films shot in Queensland
- List of films shot in Sydney
- List of films shot in Tasmania
- List of films shot in Western Australia
