= List of films and television shows shot in Alice Springs =

The following is a list of films and television shows shot wholly or partly in Alice Springs, and surrounding areas.

== Film ==
Year	Title	Locations	Ref
1946	The Overlanders	Roper River, Elsey Station, Emily Gap, Alice Springs	
1953	The Phantom Stockman (aka Return of the Plainsman)	Alice Springs	
1955	Jedda	Alice Springs	
1967	Journey Out of Darkness	Alice Springs	
1971	Walkabout	Alice Springs	
1975	The Man from Hong Kong	Uluṟu	
1985	Burke & Wills	Alice Springs	
1988	Evil Angels (aka A Cry in the Dark)	Uluṟu, Alice Springs	
1988	Young Einstein	Uluṟu-Kata Tjuṯa National Park	
1990	Quigley Down Under	Alice Springs, Ross River Homestead	
1991	Until the End of the World	Alice Springs	
1994	The Adventures of Priscilla, Queen of the Desert	Kings Canyon (Watarrka), Alice Springs	
1994	Equipaje, lista de espera, pasaporte, souvenir		
1997	Welcome to Woop Woop	Mount Ooramina, Alice Springs	
2003	Kangaroo Jack		
2004	Crying Out Love, in the Center of the World (aka Socrates in Love)	Alice Springs	
2025	Kangaroo	Alice Springs	

== Television ==
Year	Title	Locations	Ref
1984	The Disappearance of Azaria Chamberlain (or Who Killed Baby Azaria?)	Darwin, Alice Springs	
1986	The Last Frontier	Northern Territory	
1991	Soldier Soldier	Alice Springs	
2000	The Blue Planet		
2001	Bush Mechanics	Yuendumu, Central Desert Region	
2001	Outback Stripper		
2004	The Alice		
2005	Familie på farten – med farmor i Australien (aka Family on the move – with Grandma in Australia)	Alice Springs, Darwin	
2005	Here Comes the Neighbourhood		
2008	Double Trouble	Alice Springs (including Todd Mall)	
2008	Outback Wildlife Rescue	Alice Springs	
2015	8MMM Aboriginal Radio	Alice Springs	
2018	Pine Gap	Alice Springs	
2019	Robbie Hood	Alice Springs	
2022	Audrey Napanangka (documentary)		
2022	MaveriX	Alice Springs	
2022	True Colours	Alice Springs, Amoonguna	
2023	The Lost Flowers of Alice Hart	Ormiston Gorge, Standley Chasm, Simpsons Gap	

== See also ==
- Cinema of Australia
- Australian Film Commission
- Film Australia
- Screen Australia
- List of Australian films
- List of films set in Australia
- List of films shot in Adelaide
- List of films shot in Brisbane
- List of films shot on the Gold Coast
- List of films shot in Melbourne
- List of films shot in the Northern Territory
- List of films shot in Queensland
- List of films shot in Sydney
- List of films shot in Tasmania
- List of films shot in Western Australia
