= List of films shot in the Northern Territory =

The following is a list of films and television shows shot wholly or partly in the Northern Territory, Australia.

== Film ==
Year	Film	Locations	Ref
1946	The Overlanders	Roper River, Elsey Station, Emily Gap, Alice Springs	
1953	The Phantom Stockman	Alice Springs	
1955	Jedda	Coolibah Station, Standley Chasm, Ormiston Gorge, Mary River, Nitmiluk Gorge, South Alligator River, Alice Springs, Mataranka	
1967	Journey Out of Darkness	Alice Springs, Darwin, Arnhem Land	
1971	Walkabout	Alice Springs, Arnhem Land	
1974	The Dove	Darwin	
1975	The Man from Hong Kong	Uluṟu	
1977	World Safari 1: The Incredible Journey	Darwin	
1982	We of the Never Never	Elsey Station, Mataranka	
1985	Burke & Wills	Darwin, Alice Springs	
1986	Crocodile Dundee	Girraween Lagoon, Kakadu National Park (Nourlangie Rock, Ubirr Rock, Gunlom Falls)	
1988	Crocodile Dundee II	Arnhem Land, Cannon Hill, Bardedjilidji Walk	
1988	Evil Angels (aka A Cry in the Dark)	Uluru, Alice Springs, Darwin	
1988	Young Einstein	Uluṟu-Kata Tjuṯa National Park	
1990	Quigley Down Under	Alice Springs, Ross River Homestead & other NT locations	
1991	Until the End of the World	Alice Springs	
1994	The Adventures of Priscilla, Queen of the Desert	Kings Canyon (Watarrka), Alice Springs	
1995	Napoleon		
1997	Welcome to Woop Woop	Mount Ooramina, Alice Springs	
2001	Yolngu Boy	Kadadu, Darwin, North East Arnhem Land (including Lightning Dreaming at Twin Falls)	
2003	Kangaroo Jack	Northern Territory	
2004	Crying Out Love in the Center of the World	Alice Springs (aka Socrates in Love)	
2006	Ten Canoes	Arafura Swamp, Arnhem Land, Murwangi cattle station (Ramingining)	
2007	Black Water	Darwin	
2007	Rogue	Yellow Water Billabong, Katherine Gorge, Arnhem Land	
2008	Australia	Stokes Hill Wharf, Darwin Harbour	
2008	Balibo	Darwin	
2008	Love Me Again	Mataranka Station	
2009	Samson and Delilah	Alice Springs, Jay Creek	
2015	Last Cab to Darwin	Alice Springs, Barrow Creek, Tennant Creek, Daly Waters, Katherine, Darwin	
2017	Sweet Country	Ooraminna Station, Simpsons Gap, Trephina Gorge	
2019	Top End Wedding	Darwin, Jabiru, Kakadu National Park	
2020	High Ground	Arnhem Land, Kakadu National Park, Gunlom, Canon Hill	
2025	Kangaroo	Alice Springs	

== Television ==
Year	Title	Locations	Ref
1984	The Disappearance of Azaria Chamberlain (or Who Killed Baby Azaria?)	Darwin, Alice Springs	
1986	The Last Frontier	Northern Territory	
1991	Soldier Soldier	Alice Springs	
2000	The Blue Planet		
2001	Bush Mechanics	Yuendumu, Central Desert Region	
2001	Outback Stripper		
2005	The Alice	Alice Springs	
2005	Familie på farten – med farmor i Australien (aka Family on the move – with Grandma in Australia)	Alice Springs, Darwin	
2005	Here Comes the Neighbourhood		
2008	Double Trouble	Alice Springs (including Todd Mall)	
2008	Outback Wildlife Rescue	Darwin, Alice Springs	
2010	Keeping up with the Joneses	Coolibah Station	
2011	Outback Wrangler	Arafura Swamp, Top End wetlands	
2012	Territory Cops	Darwin & other NT locations	
2014	First Contact		
2015	8MMM Aboriginal Radio	Alice Springs	
2015	Outback Wrangler	Northern Territory wetlands	
2017	Black As	Arnhem Land (including Ramingining)	
2018	Pine Gap	Alice Springs	
2019	Robbie Hood	Alice Springs	
2022	Audrey Napanangka (documentary)		
2022	Barrumbi Kids	Wugularr (Beswick), Barunga, Katherine, Bitter Springs	
2022	MaveriX	Alice Springs	
2022	True Colours	Alice Springs, Amoonguna	
2023	The Lost Flowers of Alice Hart	Ormiston Gorge, Standley Chasm, Simpsons Gap	
2024	Territory	Kakadu National Park, Tipperary Station	
2025	NCIS: Sydney (season 2, episodes 9 & 10)	Darwin, Mindil Beach Casino, Frances Bay Mooring Basin, HMAS Coonawarra, Berry Springs Ski Lakes, Casuarina Beach	
2025	Top End Bub	Darwin	
2026	Deadloch (season 2)	Darwin, Batchelor	

== See also ==
- Cinema of Australia
- Australian Film Commission
- Film Australia
- Screen Australia
- List of Australian films
- List of films set in Australia
- List of films shot in Adelaide
- List of films and television shows shot in Alice Springs
- List of films shot in Brisbane
- List of films shot on the Gold Coast
- List of films shot in Melbourne
- List of films shot in Queensland
- List of films shot in Sydney
- List of films shot in Tasmania
- List of films shot in Western Australia
