= List of films shot in Adelaide =

This is a list of films shot in Adelaide or in the state of South Australia.

== Films ==
Year	Title	Locations	Ref.
1917	Remorse, a Story of the Red Plague	Mathews' Acting School	
1918	Algie's Romance	Downer family cattle station (near the Mount Lofty Ranges)	
1918	The Woman Suffers	Adelaide, Waterfall Gully, Bridgewater Hotel, Adelaide Hills, Onkaparinga, Morphettville Racecourse, Plympton, Richmond Park (including James Henry Aldridge's property Regis Marleston – formerly St Martins Aged Care Facility), Echunga	
1919	The Sentimental Bloke	Adelaide (including Henley Beach)	
1950	Bitter Springs	Flinders Ranges, Quorn, Warren Gorge	
1952	Kangaroo	Port Augusta	
1960	The Sundowners	Port Augusta, Whyalla, Quorn, Iron Knob, Hawker, Carriewerloo	
1968	Time in Summer	Victor Harbor	
1975	Jaws	Dangerous Reef, Spencer Gulf	
1975	Picnic at Hanging Rock	Martindale Hall near Mintaro, South Australian Film Corporation studios	
1975	Sunday Too Far Away	Quorn, Carriewerloo Station (near Port Augusta), Port Augusta Town Hall	
1976	The Fourth Wish	Adelaide, Adelaide Hills	
1976	Storm Boy	Coorong National Park on the Fleurieu Peninsula	
1977	The Last Wave	Mitcham (6 Church St), Adelaide	
1978	Blue Fin	Streaky Bay (on the Eyre Peninsula)	
1978	Money Movers	South Australian Film Corporation studios, Rowley Park Speedway, Port Road, Adelaide	
1978	Weekend of Shadows	Macclesfield (including main street, Cunliffe Street, Macclesfield Hotel, Blakiston Church, old footbridge, Target Flat, Strathfields Garage, Matschoss Motors garage, Macclesfield Post Office and General Store), Adelaide Hills	
1979	Dawn!	Adelaide studios	
1979	The Plumber	Adelaide (including Flinders University) (Bedford Park)	
1980	Breaker Morant	Burra (including Redruth Gaol, Heathmont Estate & Bon Accord Mine Complex), Rostrevor College (Woodforde), South Australian Film Corporation Studio (Norwood), Clare Valley	
1981	Centrespread	South Australian Film Corporation studios	
1981	Gallipoli	Beltana, Lake Torrens, Adelaide railway station, stretch of coastline 48 km west of Port Lincoln	
1981	Roadgames	Nullarbor Plain	
1981	The Survivor	Pasadena	
1982	Freedom	Adelaide	
1984	Run, Chrissie, Run!	Hendon	
1985	Burke & Wills	Coober Pedy	
1985	Mad Max Beyond Thunderdome	Coober Pedy (including Moon Plain & Breakaways Reserve)	
1985	Robbery Under Arms	Wilpena Station, Flinders Ranges, Hahndorf, SA Film Corp. studios, Hendon	
1986	Alice to Nowhere	Flinders Ranges, Marree, South Australia	
1986	Fair Game	Burra & surrounds	
1986	Playing Beatie Bow	Downtown amusement arcade & roller skating rink, Port Adelaide (including Crozier Street & West Terrace Cemetery)	
1987	Ground Zero	Coober Pedy, Woomera	
1987	The Lighthorsemen	Port Lincoln, Eyre Peninsula, Hawker (Flinders Ranges), Coffin Bay	
1988	Captain Johnno	South Australian coast	
1988	The Dreaming	Kangaroo Island (including Seal Bay & Admiral's Arch)	
1988	Fever	Port Adelaide	
1988	Sebastian and the Sparrow	Port Adelaide, West Lakes, Scotch College, Adelaide, Two Wells, Cheltenham Cemetery, Holden Motors Woodville Plant, Dublin	
1990	Return Home	Henley Beach, Henley Beach South (including The Esplanade, Military Rd, East Terrace shops, and a garage on Henley Beach Rd), Victoria Square (Adelaide CBD), Glenelg, Brighton (including Esplanade Drive near the Arch of Remembrance)	
1991	Until the End of the World	Coober Pedy, Oodnadatta, Marree	
1990	Struck by Lightning	Adelaide, Estcourt House (Tennyson)	
1993	Bad Boy Bubby	Port Adelaide, Old Adelaide Gaol, St Peter's Cathedral	
1993	Stark	Coober Pedy	
1994	The Adventures of Priscilla, Queen of the Desert	Coober Pedy	
1996	Parklands	Adelaide Botanic Gardens, Semaphore, Main North Road, Hindley Street, Gouger Street, Adelaide CBD	
1996	Shine	North Adelaide, Adelaide Town Hall, Adelaide Botanic Garden and parklands	
1997	Epsilon (aka Almost Alien and Alien Visitor)	Flinders Ranges, Ceduna, Lake Gairdner, Innamincka	
1997	Kiss or Kill	Adelaide, Ceduna, Port Augusta, Penong, Cactus Beach, Streaky Bay	
1999	In a Savage Land	Adelaide, Adelaide railway station, University of Adelaide (Mitchell Building & Barr Smith Library)	
1999	Siam Sunset	Coober Pedy	
1999	Spank!	Adelaide	
2000	Cut	Raywood House (formerly Arbury Park), near Bridgewater, Adelaide Hills	
2000	Pitch Black	Coober Pedy	
2000	Red Planet	Coober Pedy (including Kanku-Breakaways Conservation Park & Moon Plain)	
2000	Sample People	Adelaide	
2000	Selkie	Port Noarlunga South beach, Granite Island (off Victor Harbor)	
2001	One Night the Moon	Flinders Ranges, Hawker, Leigh Creek, Yappala	
2002	Australian Rules	Exeter, Grange, Port Wakefield, Largs Bay, Dublin, Thompson Beach, Middle Beach	
2002	The Tracker	Arkaroola Wilderness Sanctuary, Gammon Range, northern Flinders Ranges	
2003	Kangaroo Jack	Coober Pedy	
2004	Human Touch	Adelaide	
2005	Deck Dogz	Adelaide (including Henley High School)	
2005	Look Both Ways	National Rail Museum, Art Gallery of South Australia, Norwood Swimming Centre (Kensington), Festival Theatre, Port Adelaide, Kilkenny	
2005	The Old Man and the Inland Sea	Coober Pedy	
2005	Opal Dream	Coober Pedy	
2005	Wolf Creek	Barossa Valley, Hawker (Flinders Ranges), Semaphore, Semaphore Beach, Port Germein, Port Augusta Airport, Maslin Beach, Myponga, Sandy Creek, Thompson Beach, Port Adelaide, Glen Osmond Road (Adelaide), Middle Beach, Port Gawler, Glenelg	
2006	Like Minds (aka Murderous Intent)	Adelaide, Port Adelaide, Hendon	
2007	Lucky Miles	Adelaide, Hendon	
2007	December Boys	Kangaroo Island, Remarkable Rocks, Snug Cove, Admiral's Arch	
2007	Dr Plonk	South Australian Parliament House, Adelaide & suburbs	
2008	Hey, Hey, It's Esther Blueburger	Annesley College, St Peter's College, Marryatville High School, Annesley College	
2008	Love Story 2050	Adelaide, Kangaroo Island, Flinders Ranges, Lake Eyre	
2009	Beautiful	Adelaide	
2009	The Boys Are Back	Fleurieu Peninsula (including McLaren Vale, Myponga & Aldinga), The Advertiser building on Waymouth Street, AAMI Stadium	
2009	Closed for Winter	Largs Bay, Semaphore, Capri Theatre in Goodwood	
2009	Family Demons	Adelaide	
2010	Oranges and Sunshine	Adelaide, Flinders Ranges	
2010	Road Train	Adelaide, Flinders Ranges, Brukunga	
2011	Red Dog	Adelaide	
2011	Snowtown	Northern Adelaide, Davoren Park, Salisbury	
2012	100 Bloody Acres	Adelaide Hills	
2014	The Babadook	North Adelaide	
2014	The Rover	Port Augusta, Quorn, Hammond, Bruce, Hawker, Parachilna, Marree, Leigh Creek, Flinders Ranges	
2015	Girl Asleep	Findon High School, a private residence in Panorama, Belair National Park, Blackwood Forest Recreation Park	
2015	A Month of Sundays	Adelaide	
2016	Arrowhead	Coober Pedy	
2018	Hotel Mumbai	Adelaide Studios (Glenside), Freemasons’ Hall, Adelaide	
2019	Escape from Pretoria	Adelaide (including Mitcham railway station & Pirie Street)	
2019	I Am Mother	SAFC's Adelaide Studios	
2019	Storm Boy	Coorong, Adelaide	
2021	Mortal Kombat	Port Adelaide, Coober Pedy. Leigh Creek, Mount Crawford (Adelaide Hills), Adelaide Studios (Glenside)	
2022	Monolith	Adelaide Hills	
2022	Talk to Me	Adelaide (including Adelaide Studios, Glenside)	
2023	Emotion Is Dead	Holden Elizabeth Plant, Big Rocking Horse (Adelaide Hills), Gawler line, Hindley Street, Adelaide Botanic Garden	
2023	The Royal Hotel	Yatina and other areas in South Australia	
2023	You'll Never Find Me	Adelaide St Kilda, Hendon Film Studios	
2024	Kangaroo Island	Kangaroo Island (including Snelling Beach, Emu Bay, Stokes Bay, & Vivonne Bay)	
2025	Penny Lane Is Dead	Adelaide (including Adelaide Studios)	

== See also ==
- Australian Film Commission
- Cinema of Australia
- Film Australia
- Screen Australia
- South Australian Film Corporation
- World cinema
- List of Australian films
- List of films set in Australia
- List of films and television shows shot in Alice Springs
- List of films shot in Brisbane
- List of films shot on the Gold Coast
- List of films shot in the Northern Territory
- List of films shot in Melbourne
- List of films shot in Queensland
- List of films shot in Sydney
- List of films shot in Tasmania
- List of films shot in Western Australia
