= List of films shot in Melbourne =

The following is a list of films shot wholly or partly in Melbourne, Australia.

== Films ==
Film	Year	Locations	Ref
Ali's Wedding	2017		
Alvin Purple	1973	Yarra River, Alexandra Gardens, St Paul's Cathedral, Swanston Street, Corner of Elizabeth Street & Collins Street, Bourke Street	
Amy	1997		
Angel Baby	1995		
Animal Kingdom	2010		
Annie's Coming Out	1984	Convent of the Good Shepherd	
Any Questions for Ben?	2012		
Backstage	1988		
Bad Eggs	2003		
The Bank	2001		
Better Man	2024		
The Big Steal	1990		
Blacklight	2022		
Blessed	2009		
Body Melt	1993		
Boulevard of Broken Dreams	1988		
BoyTown	2006		
Brilliant Lies	1996		
Burke & Wills	1985	Royal Park	
The Castle	1997		
Charlotte's Web	2006		
The Cheaters	1930	Melbourne	
Children of the Silk Road	2008		
Chopper	2000		
The Clinic	1982	Melbourne	
The Club	1980	Victoria Park, Abbotsford, Collingwood Football Club	
Coming of Age	1984		
Cop This	2026	Channel 10 office building (Melbourne)	
The Cost	2022		
Crackerjack	2002		
Crackers	1998		
The Craic	1999		
Crocodile Dundee in Los Angeles	2001		
Crook	2010		
Darkness Falls	2003	Split Point Lighthouse (Aireys Inlet)	
Death in Brunswick	1991		
Death of a Soldier	1986	Melbourne (including Flinders St Station), Geelong	
Dimboola	1979	Dimboola	
The Dish	2000		
Don't Be Afraid of the Dark	2011		
Dogs in Space	1986	18 Berry Street, Richmond, Pelaco Sign	
Double Vision	2002		
The Dressmaker	2015		
Emo the Musical	2016		
The Extra	2005		
Father	1990		
Felicity	1979	Montsalvat (Eltham), Healesville railway station, Nunawading Studios	
Flynn	1997		
Frog Dreaming	1986	Woods Point (Yarra Ranges National Park), Moorooduc Quarry Flora and Fauna Reserve in Mount Eliza, Victoria, Menzies Creek railway station, Nobelius Siding	
Funny Things Happen Down Under	1965	Woodend, Mount Macedon	
Foe	2023	Docklands Studios, Winton Wetlands	
Georgia	1988		
The Getting of Wisdom	1978	Methodist Ladies' College, Kew, Eddington	
Ghost Rider	2007		
Ghosts... of the Civil Dead	1988		
Gross Misconduct	1993		
The Hard Word	2002		
Hating Alison Ashley	2005		
Head On	1998		
Hercules Returns	1993		
Holding the Man	2015		
The Home Song Stories	2007		
The Honourable Wally Norman	2003		
Horseplay	2003		
Hotel de Love	1996		
Hotel Sorrento	1995		
I Love You Too	2010		
In Her Skin	2009		
The Independent	2007		
The Interview	1998		
I, Frankenstein	2014		
Irresistible	2006		
Jackie Chan's First Strike	1996		
The Jammed	2007		
Joffa: The Movie	2010		
Judy and Punch	2019	Montsalvat (Eltham)	
Kangaroo	1986	Melbourne	
Kangaroo Palace	1997		
Kenny	2006		
Killer Elite	2011		
Knowing	2009		
Lake Mungo	2008		
The Last of the Knucklemen	1979	Cambridge Studios (Melbourne)	
Late Night with the Devil	2024		
The Legend of Ben Hall	2016		
Let's Get Skase	2001		
Leviticus	2026		
The Lighthorsemen	1987		
Lion	2016		
Lonely Hearts	1982	Inner Melbourne	
Long Weekend	1978	Phillip Island	
The Lost City of Melbourne	2022		
Love and Other Catastrophes	1996		
Love Serenade	1996		
The Loved Ones	2009		
Love's Brother	2004		
Lucky Break	1994		
Mad Max	1979	South Lawn Underground Car Park of University of Melbourne (Parkville), Spotswood (including Spotswood Pumping Station & Scienceworks Museum), Werribee, Cherry Lane (Laverton North), Clunes, Great Ocean Road (including Lorne & Fairhaven), Port Melbourne, Williamstown, Sunbury, Kew	
Magic Beach	2025		
The Magician	2005		
Main Aurr Mrs Khanna	2009		
Malcolm	1986	Collingwood (including 23 Napoleon St, Peel St & Leinster Arms Hotel on Gold St), Flemington (John St), Commonwealth Bank (Collins Street), William Angliss TAFE (La Trobe Street, South Melbourne tram depot (Kingsway (cnr of Dorcas St), Kew tram depot, Preston Workshops, Thornbury (Miller St)	
Mallboy	2001		
The Man from Snowy River	1982	Victorian High Country, Mansfield, Merrijig, Clear Hills near Mount Stirling	
The Man from Snowy River II	1988		
Man of Flowers	1983	Port Phillip Bay, Toorak, Fitzroy, Brunswick,	
Mary and Max	2009		
Memoir of a Snail	2024		
Metal Skin	1994		
Monkey Grip	1982	Carlton (including Carlton Post Office & Royal Exhibition Building)	
Mountains May Depart	2015		
Mr. Nice Guy	1997		
Muggers	2000		
The Mule	2014		
Mull	1988		
My First Wife	1984	Williamstown	
My Year Without Sex	2009		
Ned Kelly	1970	Old Melbourne Gaol	
Ned Kelly	2003		
The Neon Spectrum	2017		
Never Say Die	1988		
Next of Kin	1982	Overnewton Castle (Keilor), Clarkefield, Sydenham, Illawarra House (Toorak), Trentham	
Nightmares	1980	Melbourne	
Nirvana Street Murder	1990		
Noise	2007		
Oddball	2015		
Of an Age	2022		
On the Beach	1959	Berwick, Frankston, Ciro's nightclub, Canadian Bay Beach at Mount Eliza, General Post Office, Queenscliff High Light, Shell Geelong Refinery, Melbourne Public Library, Flinders St Station, Queen Victoria Memorial Hospital, Melbourne Showgrounds, Phillip Island Grand Prix Circuit, Williamstown Naval Dockyard, HMAS Melbourne	
One More Shot	2025	Black Rock	
One Perfect Day	2004		
Patrick	1978	The Alfred Hospital (Prahran), Simonds Hall (South Yarra), Princess Theatre, Melbourne	
Petersen	1974	University of Melbourne	
Petrol	2022		
Phar Lap	1983	Caulfield Racecourse, Flemington Racecourse, Towong Racecourse, Market Street (Melbourne CBD)	
Picnic at Hanging Rock	1975	Macedon Ranges, Hanging Rock (Ngannelong)	
The Pirate Movie	1982	Polly Woodside (South Melbourne Wharf), Melbourne Maritime Museum, Werribee Park mansion, Loch Ard Gorge (Great Ocean Road near Port Campbell)	
Predestination	2014		
Prey	2009		
Proof	1991		
Pure Shit	1975	Carlton	
QUANTA	2019		
Queen of the Damned	2002	Montsalvat (Eltham)	
Quigley Down Under	1990		
Return Home	1990		
Ride a Wild Pony	1975	Chiltern, Beechworth, Stanley, Huon Railway Siding, Murray River	
Rikky and Pete	1988		
Roadgames	1981	Diggers Rest, Port Melbourne	
Rogue	2007		
Romper Stomper	1992		
Romulus, My Father	2007		
Run Rabbit Run	2023	Melbourne central business district, Surf Coast	
Saccharine	2026	Docklands Studios Melbourne, La Trobe University, Brunswick, Beaumaris	
Salaam Namaste	2005		
The Silver Brumby	1993		
Sky Pirates	1986		
Soldiers of the Cross	1900	Richmond Baths, Bourke Street, Murrumbeena (including Belgrave House)	
South Solitary	2010		
Spotswood	1991		
Squizzy Taylor	1982	Flinders St Station (Melbourne CBD), former City West Police Station (Bourke St)	
The Story of the Kelly Gang	1906	Charterisville (near Heidelberg), St Kilda, Eltham, Greensborough, Mitcham, Rosanna	
Strictly Ballroom	1992		
Summerfield	1977	Cowes on Philip Island, Churchill Island, Western Port Bay	
Take Away	2003		
The Tender Hook	2008		
Thirst	1979	Montsalvat (Eltham), Broadmeadows (former milk factory)	
Three Dollars	2005		
Till Human Voices Wake Us	2002		
Together	2025		
Tomboys	2009		
Tom White	2004		
Travelling North	1987		
True History of the Kelly Gang	2019	Winton Wetlands	
The True Story of Eskimo Nell	1975	Sovereign Hill, Ballarat, Melbourne	
Under the Gun	1995		
Upgrade	2018		
Visitors	2003		
The Wannabes	2003		
Warm Nights on a Slow Moving Train	1988		
The Whistleblower	2019		
The Wog Boy	2000		
Wog Boy 2: Kings of Mykonos	2010		
You and Your Stupid Mate	2005		
Wanda and Sully	2023		
War Machine	2026		
When Evil Reigns	2006		
Where the Wild Things Are	2009		

== See also ==
- Australian Film Commission
- Cinema of Australia
- Film Australia
- Screen Australia
- VicScreen
- World cinema
- List of Australian films
- List of films set in Australia
- List of films shot in Brisbane
- List of films shot in Adelaide
- List of films shot in Darwin
- List of films shot in Queensland
- List of films shot in Sydney
- List of films shot in Tasmania
- List of films shot in Western Australia
