= List of films shot in Sydney =

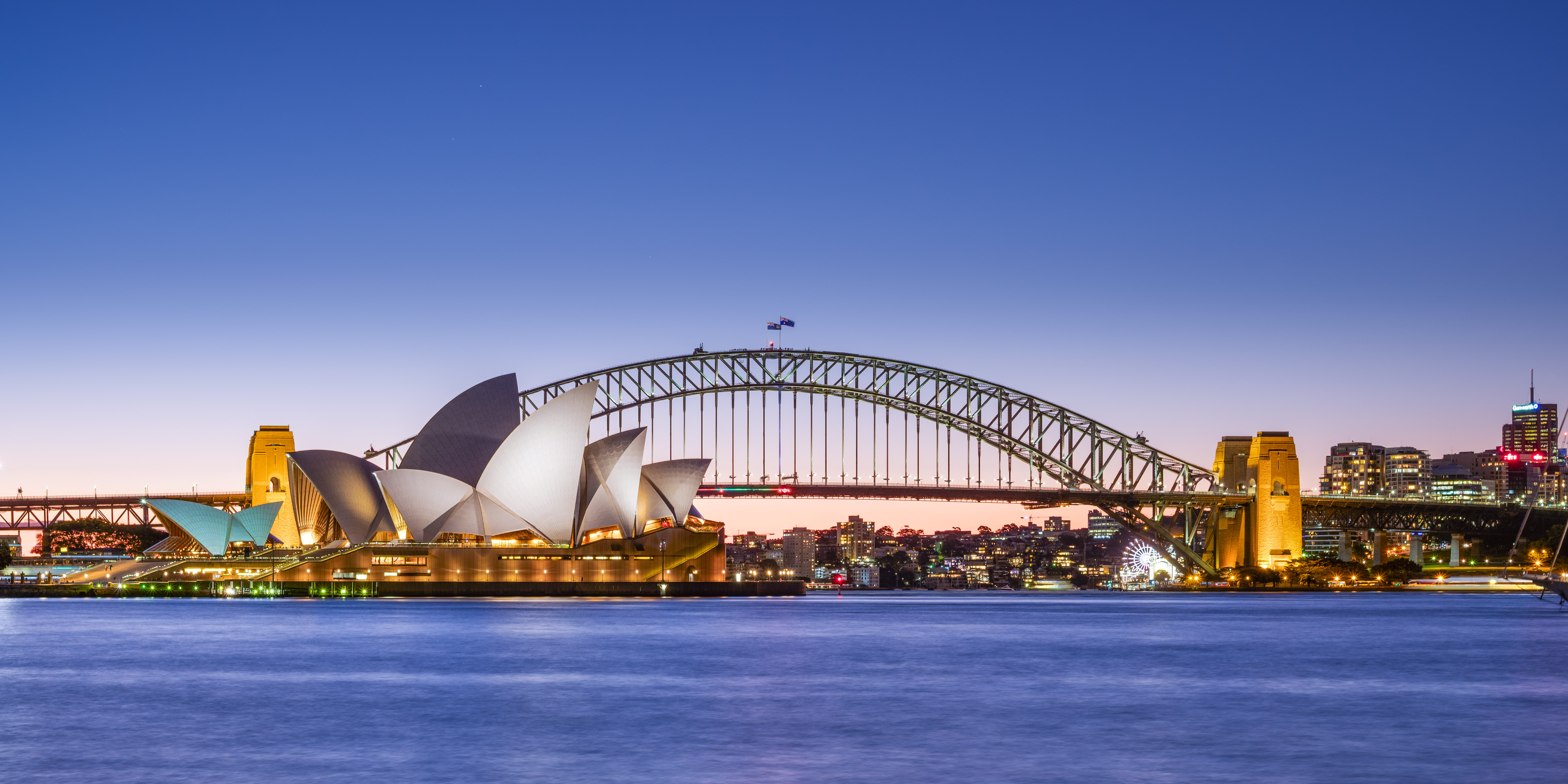
The Sydney Opera House and Sydney Harbour Bridge, located at Port Jackson (Sydney Harbour) have been the backdrop for a number of films shot in Sydney.

The following is a list of films shot wholly or partly in Sydney or elsewhere in New South Wales.

== Films ==
Year	Film	Locations	Ref.
1907	Robbery Under Arms	Narrabeen, Hornsby, Moss Vale, Wollongong racecourse, Bathurst, the Turon, Flemington saleyards	
1918	The Sentimental Bloke	Woolloomooloo, Hornsby Valley, Wonderland City (Bondi)	
1920	On Our Selection	Baulkham Hills, Leeton	
1925	Those Terrible Twins: Ginger Meggs and Bluey		
1927	For the Term of his Natural Life	Bondi studio, Parramatta River near Ryde, Convict-built gaol at Berrima, Wombeyan Caves	
1927	The Kid Stakes	Woolloomooloo, Potts Point	
1930	The Cheaters	Sydney Harbour Bridge	
1941	40,000 Horsemen		
1944	The Rats of Tobruk		
1953	Captain Thunderbolt		
1955	The Sea Chase		
1956	Smiley		
1957	Robbery Under Arms		
1957	The Shiralee		
1958	Smiley Gets a Gun		
1959	The Siege of Pinchgut		
1959	Summer of the Seventeenth Doll		
1960	Shadow of the Boomerang		
1966	They're A Weird Mob		
1969	Age of Consent		
1971	Wake in Fright		
1971	Walkabout		
1974	The Cars That Ate Paris		
1974	Stone		
1975	Down the Wind		
1975	The Removalists		
1976	Caddie		
1976	Don's Party		
1977	Dot and the Kangaroo		
1977	The FJ Holden		
1977	The Last Wave		
1978	The Chant of Jimmie Blacksmith		
1978	Money Movers		
1978	Newsfront		
1979	My Brilliant Career		
1979	The Odd Angry Shot		
1979	Tim		
1980	Fatty Finn		
1981	Hoodwink		
1981	The Killing of Angel Street		
1981	Puberty Blues		
1981	Winter of Our Dreams	1981	
1982	The Best of Friends		
1982	Dead Easy		
1982	Far East		
1982	Going Down		
1982	Heatwave		
1982	The Last Days of Chez Nous		
1982	Starstruck		
1982	The Year of Living Dangerously		
1983	BMX Bandits		
1983	Careful, He Might Hear You		
1983	The City's Edge		
1983	Undercover		
1984	Fast Talking		
1984	One Night Stand		
1984	Razorback		
1985	Bliss		
1985	Burke & Wills	Kellyville	
1985	The Coca-Cola Kid		
1985	The Empty Beach		
1985	Mad Max Beyond Thunderdome		
1986	Call Me Mr. Brown		
1986	Crocodile Dundee		
1986	Dead-End Drive In		
1986	Playing Beatie Bow		
1987	Dangerous Game		
1987	High Tide		
1987	Les Patterson Saves the World		
1987	The Year My Voice Broke		
1988	Around the World in 80 Ways		
1988	Evil Angels (aka A Cry in the Dark)		
1988	Tender Hooks		
1988	Young Einstein		
1989	Dead Calm		
1991	Flirting		
1992	Strictly Ballroom		
1992	Turtle Beach		
1993	Hercules Returns		
1993	Reckless Kelly		
1993	Sirens		
1994	The Adventures of Priscilla, Queen of the Desert		
1994	Ebbtide		
1994	Escape from Absolom		
1994	Muriel's Wedding		
1994	Spider and Rose		
1994	The Sum of Us		
1995	Babe		
1995	Mighty Morphin Power Rangers: The Movie		
1996	Children of the Revolution		
1996	Cosi		
1996	Dating the Enemy		
1996	Independence Day		
1996	The Portrait of a Lady		
1996	Shine		
1997	Doing Time for Patsy Cline		
1997	Oscar and Lucinda		
1997	Paradise Road		
1997	Paws		
1997	Thank God He Met Lizzie		
1997	The Wiggles Movie		
1998	Babe: Pig in the City		
1998	The Boys		
1998	Dark City		
1999	Erskineville Kings		
1999	Holy Smoke!		
1999	The Matrix		
1999	Me, Myself, I		
1999	Paperback Hero		
1999	Two Hands		
2000	Better Than Sex		
2000	Bootmen		
2000	Looking for Alibrandi		
2000	Mission: Impossible 2		
2000	The Monkey's Mask		
2000	Red Planet		
2000	Sample People		
2001	Birthday Girl		
2001	Dil Chahta Hai		
2001	He Died with a Felafel in His Hand		
2001	Lantana		
2001	The Man Who Sued God		
2001	Moulin Rouge!		
2001	Planet of the Apes		
2002	Dirty Deeds		
2002	Garage Days		
2002	The Hard Word		
2002	The Nugget		
2002	The Quiet American		
2002	Star Wars: Episode II – Attack of the Clones		
2003	Danny Deckchair		
2003	In the Cut		
2003	Kangaroo Jack		
2003	The Matrix Reloaded		
2003	The Matrix Revolutions		
2003	The Night We Called It a Day		
2004	Godzilla: Final Wars		
2004	Oyster Farmer		
2004	Somersault		
2004	Strange Bedfellows		
2005	Deck Dogz		
2005	Jewboy		
2005	Little Fish		
2005	Man-Thing		
2005	Son of the Mask		
2005	Star Wars: Episode III – Revenge of the Sith		
2006	Candy		
2006	Kenny		
2006	The Namesake		
2006	Suburban Mayhem		
2006	Superman Returns		
2007	Clubland		
2007	Gabriel		
2007	Gone		
2007	Razzle Dazzle: A Journey Into Dance		
2008	Australia		
2008	Bachna Ae Haseeno		
2008	The Black Balloon		
2008	Cactus		
2008	Crooked Business		
2008	The Day the Earth Stood Still		
2008	Disgrace		
2008	Frost/Nixon		
2008	Men's Group		
2008	Restraint		
2008	The Square		
2008	Three Blind Mice		
2009	Accidents Happen		
2009	Cedar Boys		
2009	Charlie & Boots		
2009	The Combination		
2009	Mao's Last Dancer		
2009	X-Men Origins: Wolverine		
2010	The Cross		
2010	Icarus		
2010	Primal		
2010	Tomorrow, When the War Began		
2012	Housos vs. Authority		
2013	The Great Gatsby		
2013	The Wolverine		
2014	Unbroken		
2014	The Water Diviner		
2015	Mad Max: Fury Road		
2016	Better Watch Out		
2016	Gods of Egypt		
2016	Hacksaw Ridge		
2017	A Silent Agreement		
2017	Alien: Covenant		
2018	Pacific Rim: Uprising		
2017	Peter Rabbit		
2019	The Invisible Man		
2019	Palm Beach		
2019	Peter Rabbit 2: The Runaway		
2020	Children of the Corn		
2020	Shang-Chi and the Legend of the Ten Rings		
2020	Sissy		
2021	Thor: Love and Thunder		
2022	6 Festivals		
2022	Three Thousand Years of Longing		
2023	Anyone But You		
2023	The Appleton Ladies' Potato Race		
2023	Birdeater		
2023	Christmess		
2024	The Correspondent		
2024	The Fall Guy		
2024	Five Blind Dates		
2024	Furiosa: A Mad Max Saga		
2024	Kingdom of the Planet of the Apes		
2024	The Moogai		
2024	Nugget Is Dead?: A Christmas Story		
2024	Sting		
2025	Fear Below		
2025	Hindi Vindi		
2025	Kangaroo		
2026	Beast		
2026	The Birthday Trip		
2026	How to Talk Australians: The Movie		
2027	Spaceballs: The New One		

== See also ==
- Australian Film Commission
- Cinema of Australia
- Film Australia
- Screen Australia
- South Australian Film Corporation
- World cinema
- List of Australian films
- List of films set in Australia
- List of films shot in Adelaide
- List of films shot in Darwin
- List of films shot in Melbourne
- List of films shot in Queensland
- List of films shot in Tasmania
- List of films shot in Western Australia
