= List of films shot in Western Australia =

The following is a list of films shot wholly or partly in the state of Western Australia.

== Films ==
Year	Film	Locations	Ref.
1971	Nickel Queen	Perth (including Parmelia Hotel), Broad Arrow	
1980	Harlequin	Western Australia	
1981	Mad Max 2	The Pinnacles	
1981	Roadgames	Nullarbor Plain	
1985	Fran		
1986	Windrider		
1988	Boundaries of the Heart		
1988	Shame		
1988	Zombie Brigade		
1991	Dingo		
1992	Clowning Around		
1992	Wind		
1993	Blackfellas		
1997	Epsilon (aka Almost Alien and Alien Visitor)	Broome, The Pinnacles, Pemberton	
1997	Under the Lighthouse Dancing		
2001	Let's Get Skase		
2002	Abandon		
2002	Rabbit-Proof Fence		
2002	Teesh and Trude		
2003	Japanese Story		
2003	Swimming Upstream		
2004	Thunderstruck		
2006	Last Train to Freo		
2006	Wolf Creek		
2008	Australia		
2008	Two Fists, One Heart		
2009	Bran Nue Dae		
2009	Crush		
2009	Prey		
2009	Stone Bros.		
2010	Blame		
2010	Wasted on the Young		
2011	Red Dog		
2012	Drift		
2013	Foreshadow		
2013	These Final Hours		
2014	Kill Me Three Times		
2014	Paper Planes		
2016	Hounds of Love		
2016	Red Dog: True Blue		
2017	Otherlife		
2020	Rams		
2022	How to Please a Woman		
2024	Kid Snow		
2024	Runt		
2024	The Surfer		
2026	Whale Shark Jack		

== See also ==
- Australian Film Commission
- Cinema of Australia
- Film Australia
- Film industry in Western Australia
- Screen Australia
- World cinema
- List of Australian films
- List of films set in Australia
- List of films shot in Adelaide
- List of films shot in Brisbane
- List of films shot in Darwin
- List of films shot in Melbourne
- List of films shot in Queensland
- List of films shot in Sydney
- List of films shot in Tasmania
