= Touch and Go (1980 film) =

- Film poster
- Directed by: Peter Maxwell
- Written by: Peter Yeldham
- Produced by: John Pellatt
- Starring: Wendy Hughes; Chantal Contouri; Carmen Duncan; Jon English; Jeanie Drynan
- Cinematography: John R. McLean
- Edited by: Sara Bennett; Paul Maxwell
- Music by: Jon English; Charlie Hull
- Production companies: Mutiny Pictures; Australian Film Commission; Queensland Film Corporation
- Distributed by: Greater Union
- Release date: 12 June 1980
- Running time: 93 min
- Country: Australia
- Language: English
- Budget: A$541,000

Touch and Go is a 1980 Australian heist film directed by Peter Maxwell and starring Wendy Hughes. The film also stars musician Jon English, who also composes music for the film.

== Plot synopsis ==
Eva, Fiona and Millicent all plan a heist together for a charitable cause.

== Cast ==
- Wendy Hughes as Eva
- Chantal Contouri as Fiona
- Jon English as Frank Butterfield
- Carmen Duncan as Millicent
- Jeanie Drynan as Gina
- Liddy Clark as Helen
- John Bluthal as Anatole
- Christine Amor as Sue Fullerton
- Brian Blain
- Barbara Stephens as Julie, the Head Mistress
- Les Foxcroft as Husband
- Vince Martin as Steve

== Production ==
The film was the idea of director Peter Maxwell. It was originally intended to be set on Hayman Island, but Reg Ansett, who had interests on the island at the time, was not keen on showing a robbery there.

It was made with funding from Greater Union, the Queensland Film Corporation and Australian Film Commission.

Shooting began in November 1979 with a month's worth of filming at Maroochydore and Noosa Heads, and eight weeks of night shooting in Sydney. Scenes set on a Great Barrier Reef island were shot at a Maroochydore hotel. Its original shooting title was Friday the 13th, but this was changed when the horror movie with the same name came out.

== Release ==
The film only ran for three weeks in a cinema in Brisbane.
