= Queensland Film Corporation =

The Queensland Film Corporation (QFC) was a government-funded film production company that existed in the state of Queensland, Australia, in the 1980s.

== History ==
The Queensland Film Corporation was established by the Queensland Film Industry Development Act 1977 and funded by the Queensland Government Its original brief was not to produce films but to encourage the development of the film industry in Queensland.

At one stage it was run by Allan Callaghan, former press officer to Sir Joh Bjelke-Petersen who was sent to gaol for misappropriating government funds.

The organisation was eventually wound up in October 1987, having spent $5.4 million on various projects.

The Queensland government later formed Film Queensland and the Pacific Film and TV Corporation.

== Current equivalent ==
As of 2022 the funding body is Screen Queensland, which owns the Screen Queensland Studios.

== Selected films ==
- Final Cut (1980)
- Touch and Go (1980)
- Airhawk (1981)
- Outbreak of Hostilities (1981)
- The Little Feller (1982)
- Silent Reach (miniseries) (1983)
- Buddies (1983)
- The Settlement (1984)
- The Naked Country (1985)
- Frenchman's Farm (1987)
- Travelling North (1987)
- Fields of Fire (1987) (miniseries)

== See also ==
- List of films shot in Queensland
- List of films shot in Brisbane
- List of films shot on the Gold Coast
