= Save the Lady =

- Directed by: Leon Thau
- Based on: book by Yoram Gross
- Produced by: Barry Pierce
- Starring: Wallas Eaton; Bill Kerr; Desmond Tester; Miranda Cartledge; Robert Clarkson; Mathew Excell; Kim Clifford
- Edited by: Mike Woolveridge
- Music by: Peter McKinley
- Production company: Tasmanian Film Corporation
- Release date: 1982
- Running time: 76 minutes
- Country: Australia
- Language: English

Save the Lady is a 1982 Australian children's film that was made in Tasmania.

The film was financed by the Tasmanian Film Corporation which was sold off to private investors in the 1980s. This has made copies of the film hard to obtain.
