= The Lost City of Melbourne =

- Film poster
- Directed by: Gus Berger
- Written by: Gus Berger
- Produced by: Gus Berger
- Cinematography: Andrew Watson; Radar Kane
- Edited by: Shannon Swan; Phoenix Anna Cherry
- Music by: Amelia Barden
- Production companies: Gusto Films; The Little Picture House
- Distributed by: Gusto Films; Madman Entertainment
- Release dates: 9 August 2022 (Melbourne International Film Festival); 1 September 2022 (Australia)
- Running time: 85 minutes
- Country: Australia
- Language: English
- Box office: $254,279

The Lost City of Melbourne is a 2022 Australian documentary film directed, written, and produced by Gus Berger. The documentary follows an attempted 'modernisation' of Melbourne in the 1950s destroyed much of the city, including its elegant cinemas and picture palaces.

The film premiered at the Melbourne International Film Festival on 9 August 2022.

== Synopsis ==
The attempted 'modernisation' of Melbourne in the 1950s destroyed much of the city, including its elegant cinemas and picture palaces. Now, a new Melbourne-made documentary brings them back to life.

== Release ==
The Lost City of Melbourne had its world premiere at the Melbourne International Film Festival on 9 August 2022. The film had a limited theatrical release on 1 September 2022. It made $257,279 at the box office. The film was made available for streaming at DocPlay on 6 July 2023. The film was released to DVD on 18 October 2023, following its airing on SBS on 14 November 2023.

== Reception ==
Craig Mathieson of The Age stated in his review: "A valuable documentary about not only how we shape our cities, but how our cities shape us, Gus Berger's feature recounts, via excellent deployment of archival material, how Melbourne's grand architectural history was literally destroyed".
