= Errol O'Neill =

Errol O'Neill (1945–2016) was an Australian activist, author, actor and playwright, based in Brisbane, Queensland. O'Neill was an activist for workers' rights and against the Vietnam War and apartheid in South Africa. These themes were reflected in his books and plays. He is also known for starring in East of Everything (2008), Frenchman's Farm (1987) and Surrender in Paradise (1976).

== Selected works ==
- O'Neill, Errol (1983). Faces in the street : a story of Brisbane during the general strike of 1912. Brisbane Repertory Theatre.
- O'Neill, Errol (1991), On the whipping side : a story of the 1891 Queensland Shearers' Strike, Playlab Press, ISBN 978-0-908156-41-2
