= Retribution (1921 film) =

1921 film

- Directed by: Armand Lionello
- Written by: Thorene Adair
- Starring: Thorene Adair
- Production company: Astrolat Film Company
- Release date: 22 October 1921
- Running time: seven reels
- Country: Australia
- Languages: Silent film English intertitles
- Box office: £130

Retribution is a 1921 Australian silent film directed by Armand Lionello, who ran a Brisbane acting school. The film was shot in Brisbane and is considered a lost film.

== Plot ==
A female detective tries to bust a crime ring operating in the city and in the sapphire mines of Anakie. The gang kill old man "Dawn", the sapphire king, and steal his gems. The detective's sister, a young nurse, is accused of the crime and imprisoned. The detective tries to clear her sister's name. There are two romantic subplots.

== Cast ==
- Thorene Adair as Arabelle Redmond
- Thora Galli

== Production ==
It was the second entirely locally made Brisbane film, the first being The Raiders. Local buildings featured heavily, including Boggo Road Gaol. It was shot over three months, in between June and August 1921.

Scenes from the movie were enacted at a recital.

== Reception ==
The film was poorly reviewed and seems to have flopped at the box office. The Astrolat Film Company announced plans to make another movie, Whose Baby? but it appears never to have been shot.

Star Thora Galli later sued Astrolat for £200 in unpaid wages. Her husband Leo worked on the movie.
