= Outback Wildlife Rescue =

- Genre: Observational Documentary
- Presented by: Ernie Dingo
- Country of origin: Australia
- Original language: English
- No. of episodes: 13

Production
- Producer: Chris Thorburn
- Production location: Australia
- Running time: 30 Minutes
- Production company: Freehand Productions

Original release
- Network: Seven Network
- Release: 7 September 2008 – 2013

Outback Wildlife Rescue is an observational documentary series that features animal rescue set against the Australian outback. The cast includes wildlife vets, animal carers, a crocodile, and management team.

The series is produced by Freehand Productions for broadcast on the Seven Network in 2008. BBC Worldwide distribute the series internationally.
