= Hindi Vindi =

2025 Australian drama film

- Directed by: Ali Sayed
- Written by: Jayant Sharma, Ali Sayed
- Produced by: Aniket Deshkar
- Starring: Mihir Ahuja; Neena Gupta; Guy Sebastian
- Production companies: Ana Productions; 24Six Films
- Distributed by: The Backlot Films
- Release date: 27 February 2025 (Australia)
- Running time: 118 mins
- Country: Australia
- Languages: English, Hindi

Hindi Vindi is a 2025 Indian-Australian co-production drama film directed by Ali Sayed and is the acting debut for Guy Sebastian.

The film received development funding from Screen Australia and is produced by 24Six Films in association with Drishya Sharma Productions.

== Synopsis ==
Kabir (Mihir Ahuja) is a teenage musician growing up in Sydney. When his Indian grandmother (Neena Gupta) comes to live with him, they struggle to connect over language and cultural barriers before bonding over music.

== Cast ==
- Neena Gupta as Mrs. Arya
- Mihir Ahuja as Kabir
- Guy Sebastian as James

== Production ==
The filming took place around Sydney Australia and was completed on 13 February 2024.

== Release ==
Hindi Vindi was released in Australian cinemas on 27 February 2025.

== Soundtrack ==
The soundtrack of Hindi Vindi was released digitally on 14 Ferbaury 2025 via Academy Music Records.

Hindi Vindi
No.	Title	Writer(s)	Length
1.	"Made of Heart" (performed by Guy Sebastian, Zaire Koalo, Trevor Brown featuring Samantha Jade)	Guy Sebastian, Zaire Koalo, Trevor Brown	2:38
2.	"Like a Phoenix" (performed by Sebastian, Javid-Mohsin, Priyani Vani Panditt and Rashmi Virag)	Sebastian, Javid-Mohsin, Virag	3:03
3.	"I Woke Up Yesterday" (performed by Javid-Mohsin, Liam Ferrari, Jay Sharma, Rashmi Virag)	Javid-Mohsin, Sharma, Virag	3:45
4.	"Teri Boli" (performed by Chinmayi, Sebastian, Javid-Mohsin, Virag)	Sebastian, Javid-Mohsin, Virag	4:42
5.	"Jee Le" (performed by Javid-Mohsin, Mellow D, Siddharth Mahadevan, Rashmi Virag)	Javid-Mohsin, Virag	4:00
6.	"Jee Le (reprise)" (performed by Javid-Mohsin, Michael Kasif, Shivani Mehta, Sharma, Virag)	Javid-Mohsin, Kasif, Mehta, Sharma, Virag	4:10
7.	"If You Can Hear Me (RAP)" (performed by Viento Franco, Javid-Mohsin, Kasif, Mehta)	Franco, Javid-Mohsin, Kasif, Mehta	3:41
Total length:			26:03
