= Surrender in Paradise =

- Directed by: Peter Cox
- Written by: Peter Cox
- Produced by: Peter Cox
- Starring: Ross Gilbert; Errol O'Neill
- Cinematography: Donald McAlpine
- Edited by: Bob Blasall; Peter Cox
- Music by: Ralph Tyrrell
- Production company: Paradise Pictures
- Release date: 4 October 1976
- Running time: 92 minutes
- Country: Australia
- Language: English
- Budget: AU$30,000

Surrender in Paradise is a 1976 Australian film directed by Peter Cox and starring Ross Gilbert and Errol O'Neill. It has been referred to as "Queensland's first alternative film".

== Plot ==
Around 1900, bushranger Rusty Swan receives a message that his mother is dying. He sets off with his partner Cecil and girlfriend Valda to see her, chased by a posse led by Sergeant Rutter. They travel through time and wind up in modern-day Surfers Paradise.

== Cast ==
- Ross Gilbert as Rusty Swan
- Errol O'Neill as Sergeant Rutter
- Carolyn Howard as Valda
- Rod Wissler as Cecil

== Production ==
Two thirds of the film's cost was provided by the Film, Radio and Television Board of the Australia council. Shooting took place in November and December 1975 near Brisbane and on the Queensland Gold Coast.

It was the first and only feature film from Queensland director Peter Cox.
