= Royal Exchange Hotel, Brisbane =

Heritage-listed hotel in Brisbane, Australia

Coordinates: 27.48640°S 152.992590°E

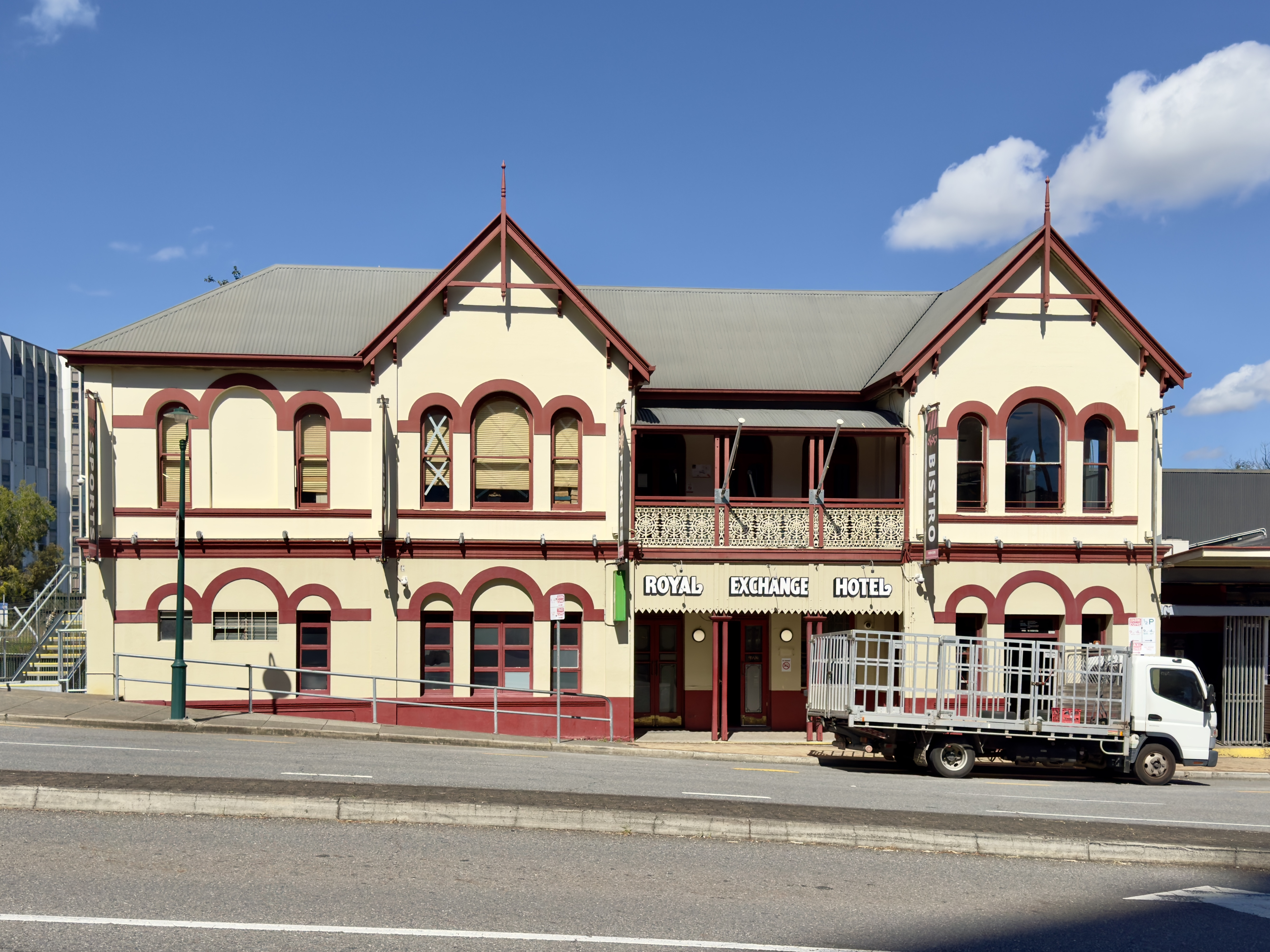
The Royal Exchange Hotel, viewed from High Street, 2025

The Royal Exchange Hotel (locally known as the 'RE') is a heritage-listed hotel located at 10 High Street, Toowong, Brisbane, Queensland, Australia.

== History ==
The Royal Exchange Hotel was built in about 1886, designed by Brisbane architect Richard Gailey. The first licensee was William Robertson.

In 1917 Jim Cavill was the licensee of the Royal Exchange. He went on to be the pioneer of Surfers Paradise.

In August 2013, the Australian Pub Fund bought the hotel with a final offer between $35 million and $40 million. This purchase is the biggest deal on record in Brisbane.

The pub featured in the 2007 film All My Friends Are Leaving Brisbane.

== Heritage listing ==
The Royal Exchange is listed on the Brisbane Heritage Register. It is a prominent landmark in the centre of Toowong and has been an important part of social life in Toowong for over a century.

== See also ==
- List of public houses in Australia
