= Southport Courthouse =

Coordinates: 27°58′01.62″S 153°24′46.16″E

- Main sign

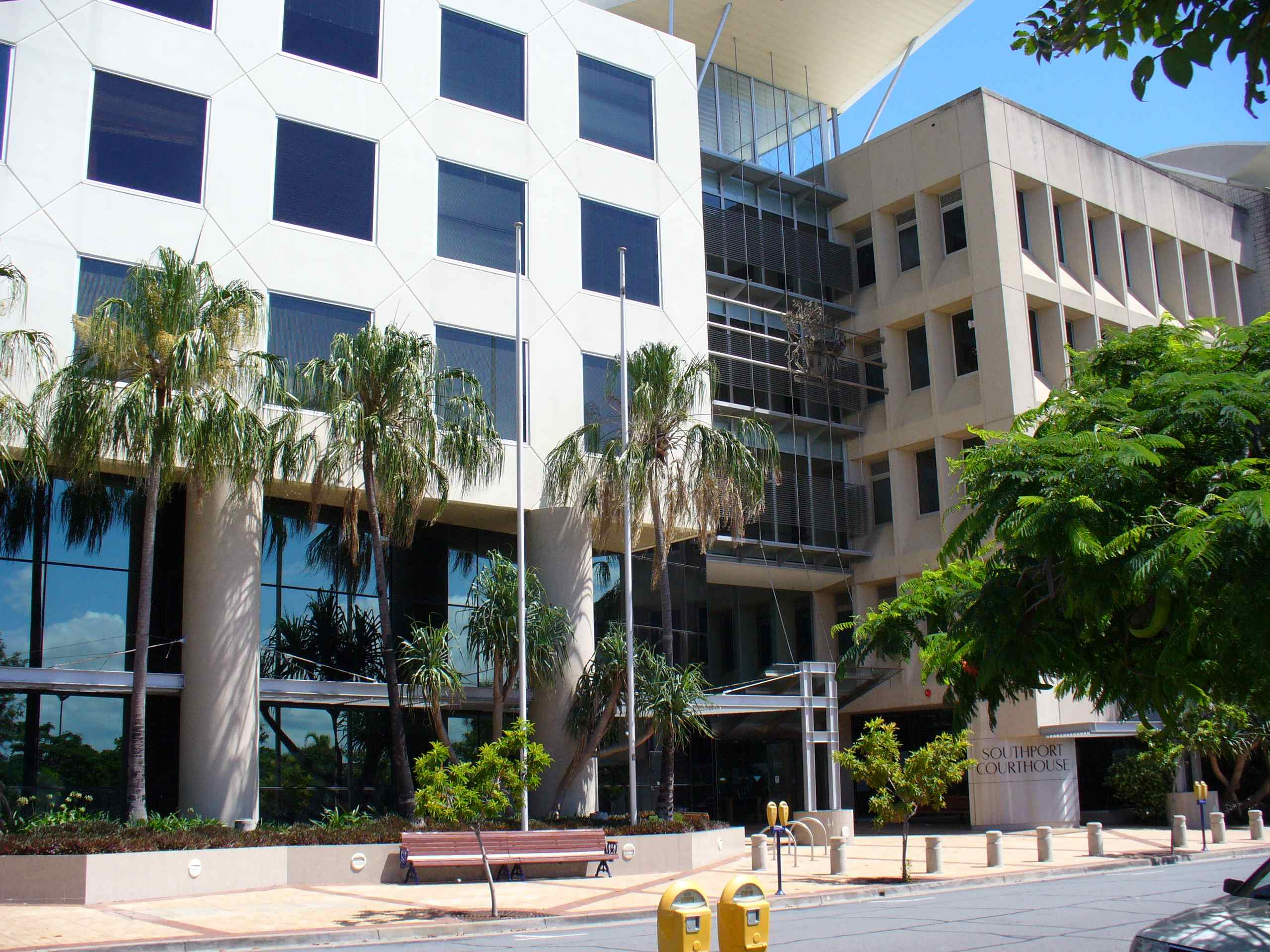
- Front of building, 2006
- Interactive map of the Southport Courthouse area

General information
- Status: Open
- Type: Courthouse
- Location: Corner Davenport and Hinze Streets, Southport, Gold Coast, Australia
- Opened: 2 February 1998

Southport Courthouse is the Gold Coast's major courthouse. It houses courtrooms and chambers for part of the District Court of Queensland, which has jurisdiction to hear criminal offences with penalties of less than 20 years imprisonment, some criminal offences with penalties of over 20 years imprisonment, and civil matters up to A$750,000.

It is located in the Southport legal district on the corner of Davenport and Hinze Street. A subsidiary Magistrates' Court of Queensland is located at Coolangatta.

The building was designed by ABM Architects. When completed the building housed five district courts, nine magistrates courts, a central registry, accommodation for 13 magistrates, six judges, and a watchhouse which contains cells for 68 detainees.

== Court complex extensions ==
Queensland Premier Rob Borbidge opened the $25.9 million Southport Court extensions and watch house on February 2, 1998.

== Judges ==
Southport's judges are:

- Judge J.E. Newton - 25 February 1991
- Judge C.F Wall Q.C - 11 September 1996
- Judge M. E. Rackemann - 12 January 2004
- Judge F Kingham -17 July 2006.
