= Tasmanian Film Corporation =

Short lived government authority

The Tasmanian Film Corporation was a Tasmanian statutory corporation founded in 1977 to replace the Tasmanian Government Department of Film Production. However, following a brief period of success it was privatised by Premier Robin Gray in 1983 and shut down progressively over the following decade.

== Films ==
By far its biggest success was Manganinnie (1980), an AFI Award and AWGIE Award winning feature film. Other productions included The Willow Bend Mystery, A Fish For All Seasons (1982), a 10-part miniseries for the Tasmanian Fisheries Development Authority, Impressions of a Colony (1980) for the National Parks and Wildlife Service, Save the Lady (1982) and Helicopter Tasmania (1982)
