= Posthumous (2026 film) =

2026 Australian thriller film

- Directed by: Josh Tanner
- Screenplay by: Josh Tanner; Jade van der Lei
- Produced by: Josh Tanner; Jade van der Lei
- Starring: Sophie Lowe; David Roberts; Doris Younane
- Cinematography: Jason Hargreaves
- Edited by: Michelle McGilvray
- Music by: Ack Kinmonth
- Production companies: Imposter Syndrome; Special Day Productions Pty Ltd
- Release date: 19 September 2026 (Fantastic Fest)
- Running time: 110 minutes
- Country: Australia
- Language: English

Posthumous is a 2026 Australian thriller film written and produced by Josh Tanner and Jade van der Lei, and directed by Tanner. The film follows Zoe, played by Sophie Lowe, a woman who returns to her old family home to confront a powerful supernatural force. It had its world premiere in Fantastic Fest in Austin, Texas on 19 September 2026.

== Plot ==
The film follows Zoe a woman who returns to her family home to be close to her father and to confront a powerful force of something supernatural. A discovery of a videotape threatens to undo everything she had learned of her mothers final days .

== Cast ==
On 11 April 2025 the film named the cast.

- Sophie Lowe as Zoe
- David Roberts as Neil
  - George Pullar as Young Neil
- Doris Younane as Brenda
  - Mia Morrissey as Young Brenda
- Remy Hii as Alex
- Christopher James Baker as Rohan
- Kira-Che Heelan as Joanne

== Production ==
On 10 October 2024 Screen Australia announced the funding for 15 projects with Posthumous a part of the projects. Screen Queensland would secure the funding and support for the project.

On 11 April 2025 it was announced that the project had entered production and was being filmed on location in Brisbane and at Pinnacle Film Studios on the Gold Coast.

The film is produced and directed by Josh Tanner and Jade van der Lei, through production company by Imposter Syndrome.

== Release ==
Posthumous had its world premiere in Fantastic Fest on 19 September 2026. It was screened in the Panorama section of the 59th Sitges Film Festival on 8 October 2026.
