= The Raiders (1921 film) =

1921 film

- Directed by: B. A. Melville
- Starring: Armand Lionello, May Bradford
- Cinematography: B. Kirwan
- Release date: 20 October 1921
- Country: Australia
- Languages: Silent film English intertitles

The Raiders is a 1921 Australian silent film directed by B. A. Melville. The film was shot in Brisbane about eight miles from the Indooroopilly Railway Station and is considered a lost film.

== Plot ==
A story of the Australian bush, played by Australians, with May Bradford Shepherd in a leading role.

== Cast ==
- Armand Lionello as the lead actor
- Arthur Keighley as the hero
- May Bradford Shepherd as the lead actress

== Production ==
The Raiders was the first entirely locally made Brisbane film. The establishment of the film was documented on page 3 of the Telegraph Brisbane Newspaper of 15 November 1920: Brisbane "Kinema: Club. Attention is called to an advertisement elsewhere in these columns of the meeting to be held for the purpose of establishing the picture producing industry in Brisbane. The Brisbane Kinema Club have made the Lyceum Theatre their headquarters, where all particulars as to membership, objects, etc., may be obtained from the manager of the theatre. Operations have already commenced, and the first Queensland production is now in progress. The cast includes Miss May Bradford, an excellent type of Australian sportswoman, whose action in the piece calls for expert horse management. The heavy lead is taken by Armand Lionello, (late of Cines Film Company, Rome). Arthur Keighley, who plays the hero was formerly a member of J. C. Williamson and Julius Knight Companies. Several "Diggers" are included in the cast, and give promise of their performances. The location chosen has been placed at the disposal of the players by C. O'Brien, of Moggil, and embraces some grand scenery, so near to Brisbane, yet so little known, being situated about eight miles from Indoorpilly Railway station. Mr. B. Kirwan is in charge of the camera, and Mr. B. A. Melville is director.

== Reception ==
On 19 October 1921 the Maryborough Chronicle, Wide Bay and Burnett Advertiser carried an article about a film to be shown at a local cinema: The Raiders was screened last night before a fairly large house. The picture, which ran the gauntlet of many critical eyes, was generally classed as a fine production. It proved, too, the possibilities of the cinema in Queensland, and the industry, once commenced, should receive every encouragement. It opens up many possibilities.
