= Bondi Tsunami =

- Directed by: Rachael Lucas
- Written by: Rachael Lucas
- Produced by: Anthony Lucas Smith; Naomi Lucas Smith
- Starring: Keita Abe; Taki Abe; Nobuhisa Ikeda; Miki Sasaki
- Cinematography: Rachael Lucas
- Edited by: Michael Jones
- Distributed by: Madman Entertainment
- Release date: 23 September 2004
- Running time: 91 minutes
- Country: Australia
- Languages: English; Japanese
- Budget: $150,000

Bondi Tsunami is a 2004 Australian comedy-drama film written directed by Rachael Lucas, inspired by young Japanese tourists who come to Australia on working holiday visas in search of sun and surf. The film plays as a road movie about Japanese surfing culture, told through a series of extended montages set to music, interspersed with poetic zen musings. Much of the film's dialogue is in Japanese, with little English spoken despite the Australian setting. The movie was billed as "The first Japanese surfing road movie in Australia." Although unable to secure an official cinema release due to its limited appeal, the film has attracted a cult following based on its controversial style.

Two scenes from the Bondi Tsunami were adapted into separate short films, with Beach Route winning the 2003 Port Macquarie Short Film Festival and Gunja Men Ahead in the official selection at the International New York Short Film Festival in 2004.

== Plot ==
Shark, a surfer from Japan who is living in Bondi with no apparent direction, expectations, or goals, decides to join his friend Yuto and set off on a road trip through eastern Australia in a 1961 EK Holden station wagon. As they search for the perfect wave, they meet up with Shark's ex-girlfriend Kimiko, a girl who embodies the Japanese kawaii (or "cute") culture, and the mysterious Gunja Man, who claims to be travelling to Nimbin. The four continue their journey, stopping at many pubs, smoking large quantities of cannabis and visiting iconic Australian landmarks, including "Big" tourist attractions The Big Pineapple, Big Merino and Big Banana.

== Cast ==
- Keita Abe as Yuto
- Taki Abe as Shark
- Nobuhisa Ikeda as the Gunja Man
- Miki Sasaki as Kimiko

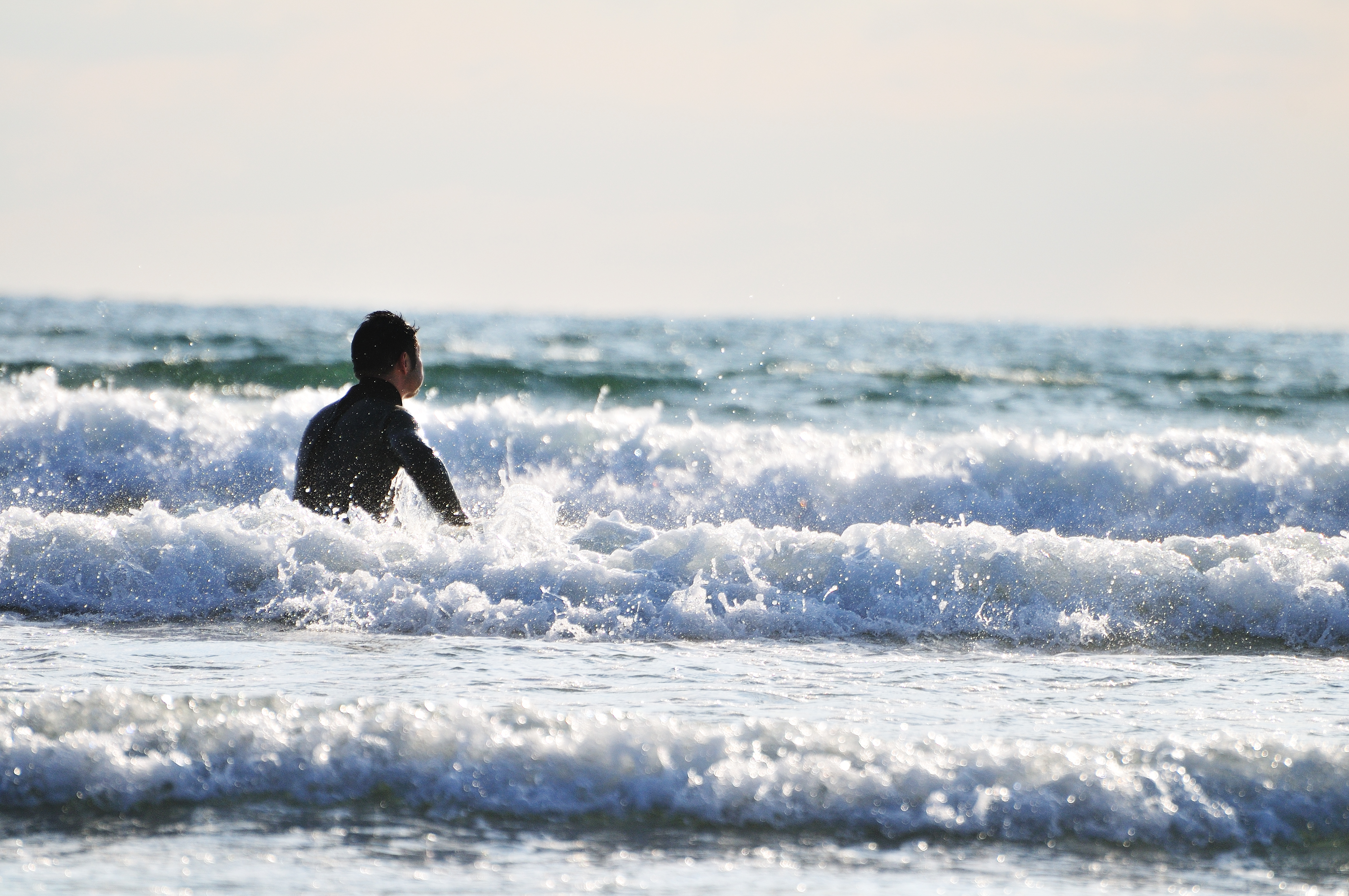
A Japanese man surfing.

== Production ==
Rachael Lucas claims to be at the forefront of the digital guerrilla filmmaking revolution. She is known for her unique visual style and has a background in documentary and music videos. Bondi Tsunami is Lucas' first feature as a writer and director.

Bondi Tsunami was produced on a microbudget of $150,000, with the funds being sourced from the production team's credit cards Lucas's inspiration for the film came when she stumbled upon a Subculture of Japanese surfers who modeled themselves on Australian surf brands. Identifying a potential audience for a movie, but with a limited budget and no studio interest, Lucas used guerilla tactics to garner publicity for the project, which attracted media interest through the Seven Network and Rolling Stone magazine. Shooting took place at various locations throughout New South Wales and Queensland, with most of the beach scenes being shot on the Central Coast, using improvisation in place of a formal script. Large parts of the film have no dialogue at all, while others are narrated through haiku poetry. None of the cast had any acting experience, nor was a professional film crew used.

== Marketing ==
As an independent foreign-language film, Bondi Tsunami was unable to secure a cinema release. Instead, the producers hired a number of theatres around the country and embarked on a national publicity tour. A competition on the film's official website allowed people to vote for the movie to screen in their hometown. After receiving the most votes, the town of Cobar was selected for the premiere on 3 September 2004 before the film's official release in Sydney on 23 September.

== Reception ==
The film was received mixed reviews. Variety magazine reviewer Russell Edwards described Bondi Tsunami as a misguided, aimless and amateurish "sun-bronzed, but lacklustre imitation of the Japanese slacker flicks which regularly unspool at international fests" and was critical of the films production techniques. Megan Spencer of national youth radio network Triple J was more generous in her review, giving the film a rating of 3.5/5, praising it as ambitious and experimental, but noting that its repetitious imagery and style akin to music videos may become tedious to some audiences.
