= List of films shot in Tasmania =

The following is a list of films shot wholly or partly in Tasmania, Australia.

== Films ==
Year	Title	Locations	Ref.
1908	For the Term of His Natural Life	Port Arthur	
1925	Jewelled Nights	Zeehan	
1927	For the Term of His Natural Life	Port Arthur, Macquarie Harbour, Strahan	
1962	They Found a Cave	New Town Station, Richmond, Glenorchy, Tasmanian north coast, South-East Tasmania, Elwick Showground	
1979	Slippery Slide	Tasmania	
1980	Manganinnie	Central Tasmania, West Coast	
1982	Save the Lady	Hobart	
1984	The Wild Duck	Tasmania	
1987	The Tale of Ruby Rose	Central Highlands	
1989	Boys in the Island	Tasmania	
1990	Aya	Hobart	
1990	Tasmania Story (タスマニア物語, Tasumania Monogatari)	Southern Tasmania (near Hobart)	
1992	DeVil's Tasmania (aka Three Cornered Island)		
1994	Exile	Freycinet Peninsula	
1995	Napoleon	Cataract Gorge (Launceston), Tasmanian Museum & Art Gallery (Hobart)	
1997	Epsilon (aka Almost Alien and Alien Visitor)	Cradle Mountain, Mount Barrow, Liffey Falls	
1997	Oscar and Lucinda	Glebe (Hobart)	
1998	The Sound of One Hand Clapping	Hobart, Central Highlands, Mount Field region	
2000	Beyond Gravity	Tasmania	
2003	Boys	Bridestowe Lavender Estate (Scottsdale, Tasmania)	
2004	Testing Taklo	Hobart	
2006	Rosebery 7470	Rosebery	
2007	Andrew, Sauveteur de baleines en Tasmanie		
2008	Dying Breed	Murchison Dam, Lake Murchison	
2008	The Last Confession of Alexander Pearce	Central Highlands, Derwent Bridge, Lake St Clair, Mount Wellington, Nelson Falls, Tahune Forest Reserve	
2009	Blind Company	Bicheno	
2009	Love the Beast	Targa Tasmania, Launceston	
2009	Van Diemen's Land	Lake Binney, Bronte Park, Wild Rivers National Park	
2010	Arctic Blast	Hobart (including Tasmania Fire Service)	
2011	The Hunter	Hobart Airport, Hotel Grand Chancellor, Mount Wellington, Central Plateau, Upper Florentine Valley, Maydena	
2013	Goddess	Tasmania	
2013	The Outlaw Michael Howe	Mount Field National Park	
2016	The Light Between Oceans	Stanley (North West Tasmania)	
2016	Lion	Hobart, Mount Wellington, Marion Bay, Bruny Island	
2017	Blood Hunt	Tasmania	
2018	The Nightingale	Oatlands, Derwent Valley, Central Highlands, Mount Field National Park	
2020	The Slaughterhouse Killer		
2022	Beaten to Death	Southern Tasmania (including Derwent Valley & Central Midlands)	

== See also ==
- Australian Film Commission
- Cinema of Australia
- Film Australia
- Screen Australia
- Screen Tasmania
- Tasmanian Film Corporation
