= List of films set in Australia =

This is a list of films set in Australia (and not just only filmed or created in Australia):

== 0–9 ==
- 100 Bloody Acres (2012)
- 2:37 (2006)
- 48 Shades (2006)
- 6 Festivals (2022)
- $9.99 (2008)

== A ==
- Aadavari Matalaku Arthale Verule (2007)
- ABBA: The Movie (2007)
- Adam's Woman (1970)
- The Adventures of Priscilla, Queen of the Desert (1994)
- After the Deluge (2003)
- Age of Consent (1969)
- Alex & Eve (2016)
- Alexandra's Project (2003)
- All My Friends Are Back in Brisbane (2026)
- All My Friends Are Leaving Brisbane (2007)
- Allen (2026)
- Alvin Purple (1973)

- Alvin Rides Again (1974)

- Amy (1997)
- Animal Kingdom (2010)
- Annie's Coming Out (1984)
- Any Questions for Ben? (2012)
- Anyone But You (2023)
- The Appleton Ladies' Potato Race (2023)
- Aquamarine (2006)
- Around the Boree Log (1925)
- As Time Goes By (1988)
- Australia (1989)
- Australia (2008)
- Australian Rules (2002)

== B ==
- The Babadook (2014)
- Bachna Ae Haseeno (2008)
- The Back of Beyond (1954)
- Back of Beyond (1995)
- Back to the Outback (2021)
- Bad Behaviour (2010)
- Bad Boy Bubby (1993)
- Bad Eggs (2003)
- The BBQ (2018)
- Beaconsfield (2012)
- Beautiful (2009)
- Beneath Clouds (2002)
- Big Ideas (1993)
- The Big Steal (1990)
- Bigger Than Tina (1999)
- Birdeater (2023)
- The Birth of White Australia (1928)
- The Birthday Trip (2026)
- Black and White (2002)
- The Black Balloon (2008)
- Black Water (2007)
- Blackrock (1997)
- Blame (2011)
- Bleeding Steel (2017)
- Blinky Bill (1992)
- Blinky Bill the Movie (2015)
- Bliss (1985)
- Blueback (2022)
- Blue Fin (1978)
- Blurred (2002)
- BMX Bandits (1983)
- Body Melt (1993)
- Bondi Tsunami (2004)
- Bootmen (2000)
- The Boys (1998)
- Bran Nue Dae (2009)
- Break Ke Baad (2010)
- Breath (2017)
- Buckley's Chance (2021)
- Burning Man (2011)
- Butterfly Island (1985)

== C ==
- Cactus (1986 drama) by Paul Cox
- Cactus (2008 road movie)
- Caddie (1976)
- Candy (2006)
- Careful, He Might Hear You (1983)
- The Cars That Ate Paris (1974)
- The Castle (1997)
- Chak De India (2007)
- The Chant of Jimmie Blacksmith (1972)
- Charlie and Boots (2009)
- Children of the Revolution (1996)
- Chopper (2000)
- Christmess (2023)
- City of the Damned
- Closed for Winter (2009)
- Clubland (2007)
- The Coca-Cola Kid (1985)
- The Coolangatta Gold (1984)
- Cop This (2026)
- Cosi (1996)
- The Cowra Breakout (1985)
- Crackerjack (2002)
- Crackers (1998)
- The Craic (1999)
- Crawl (2011)
- Crimes at the Dark House (1940)
- Crocodile Dundee (1986)

- Crocodile Dundee II (1988)
- Crocodile Dundee in Los Angeles (2001)

- The Crocodile Hunter: Collision Course (2002)
- Crook (2010)
- The Crop (2004)
- The Crossing (1990)
- The Cup (2011)

== D ==
- Dad and Dave: On Our Selection (1995)
- Daisy Quokka: World's Scariest Animal (2020)
- Dangerous Animals (2025)
- Danny Deckchair (2003)
- Dating the Enemy (1996)
- Dawn! (1979)
- Daybreakers (2009)
- Dead End Drive-In (1986)
- Dead Letter Office (1998)
- Death in Brunswick (1990)
- Death of a Soldier (1986)
- December Boys (2007)
- Deck Dogz (2005)
- The Delinquents (1989)
- Dil Chahta Hai (2001)
- Dimboola (1979)
- Dingo (1991)
- Dirt Music (2019)
- Dirty Deeds (2002)
- The Dish (2000)
- Dogs in Space (1986)
- Doing Time for Patsy Cline (1997)
- Don's Party (1971)
- Double Happiness Uranium (2013)
- The Dressmaker (2015)
- Drive Hard (2014)
- The Drover's Boy (never completed)
- The Drover's Wife: The Legend of Molly Johnson (2021)
- The Dry (2020)

- Force of Nature: The Dry 2 (2024)

- Dying Breed (2008)

== E ==
- Eliza Fraser
- Emo the Musical (2016)
- Emotion Is Dead (2023)
- Erskineville Kings (1999)
- Eucalyptus
- The Everlasting Secret Family (1988)
- Evil Angels (a.k.a. A Cry in the Dark) (1988)
- The Extra (2005)
- The Eye of the Storm (2011)

== F ==
- The Fall Guy (2024)
- Fat Pizza (2003)

- Fat Pizza vs. Housos (2014)

- Fatty Finn (1980)
- Fear Below (2025)
- FernGully: The Last Rainforest (1992)

- FernGully 2: The Magical Rescue (1998)

- A Few Best Men (2011)
- Finding Nemo (2003)
- The Finished People (2003)
- Five Blind Dates (2024)
- The FJ Holden (1977)
- Flirting (1991)
- Footy Legends (2006)
- Fortress (1986)
- Forty Thousand Horsemen (1940)
- Frog Dreaming (a.k.a. The Quest, The Go-Kids) (1986)
- The Furnace (2020)

== G ==
- Gallipoli (1981)
- Garage Days (2002)
- Geordie (1955)
- Gettin' Square (2003)
- The Getting of Wisdom (1977)
- Ginger Meggs (1982)
- A Girl in Australia (a.k.a. Bello onesto emigrato Australia sposerebbe compaesana illibata) (1971)
- Go! (2019)
- The Goddess of 1967 (2000)

== H ==
- Happy Feet (briefly) (2006)
- The Hard Word (2002)
- Harvie Krumpet (2003)
- Hating Alison Ashley (2005)
- He Died with a Felafel in His Hand (2001)
- Head On (1998)
- Healing (2014)
- The Heartbreak Kid (1993)
- Heatwave (1982)
- Heaven's Burning (1997)
- Heyy Babyy (2007)
- High Ground (2020)
- Hindi Vindi (2025)
- Holding the Man (2015)
- Hollywood (2002)
- Holy Smoke! (1999)
- The Honourable Wally Norman (2003)
- The Horseman (2008)
- Housos vs. Authority (2012)
- Howling III (1987)
- How to Make Gravy (2024)
- How to Talk Australians: The Movie (2026)
- The Hunter (2011)

== I ==
- I Love You Too (2010)
- The Inbetweeners 2 (2014)
- The Incredible Journey of Mary Bryant (TV miniseries)
- Indian (1996 film)
- Independence Day (1996)

== J ==
- Jackie Chan's First Strike (1996) (a.k.a. Police Story 4: First Strike)
- Jaggubhai (2010)
- Jandamarra's War (2011)
- Japanese Story (2003)
- Jasper Jones (2017)
- Jedda (1955)
- Jindabyne (2006)
- Joffa: The Movie (2010)

== K ==
- Kangaroo (1952)
- Kangaroo (1986)
- Kangaroo (2025)
- Kangaroo Island (2024)
- Kangaroo Jack (2003)
- Kath & Kim:

- Da Kath & Kim Code (TV movie) (2005)
- Kath & Kimderella (2012)

- Keith (2008)
- Kenny (2006)
- Kid Snow (2024)
- The Kid Stakes (1927)

== L ==
- Ladies in Black (2018)
- Lantana (2001)
- Last Cab to Darwin (2015)
- The Last Confession of Alexander Pearce (2009 film)
- The Last Days of Chez Nous (1992)
- The Last of the Knucklemen (1979)
- The Last Trackers of the Outback (2007 documentary film)
- Last Train to Freo (2006)
- The Last Wave (1977)
- The Legend of Ben Hall (2016)
- Let's Get Skase (2001)
- Leviticus (2026)
- Limbo (2023)
- Lion (2016)
- A Little Bit of Soul (1998)
- The Little Death (2014)
- Little Fish (2005)
- Lonesome (2022)
- Long Weekend (1978)
- Long Weekend (2008)
- Look Both Ways (2005)
- Looking for Alibrandi (2000)
- Love and Other Catastrophes (1996)
- Love Is in the Air (2023)
- Love Me Again (2009 Filipino film)
- Love Serenade (1996)
- The Loved Ones (2009)
- Love's Brother (2004)

== M ==
- Mad Bastards (2011)
- Mad Max (1979)
- Mad Max 2 (1981)
- Mad Max Beyond Thunderdome (1985)
- Mad Max: Fury Road (2015)
- The Magic Pudding (2000)
- Malcolm (1986)
- The Man from Down Under (1943)
- The Man from Hong Kong (1975)
- The Man from Snowy River (1920)
- The Man from Snowy River (1982)
- The Man from Snowy River II (1988) (a.k.a. Return to Snowy River (US), and The Untamed (UK))
- Man of Flowers (1983)
- The Man Who Sued God (2001)
- The Mango Tree (1977)
- Marking Time (2003)
- Mary and Max (2009)
- Melodrama/Random/Melbourne (2018)
- Memoir of a Snail (2024)
- Mental (2012)
- A Million (2009)
- Mission: Impossible 2 (2000)
- The Moogai (2024)
- Mountains May Depart (2015)
- Mr. Accident (2000)
- Mr. Nice Guy (1997)
- Mr. Perfect (2011)
- Mr. Reliable (1996)
- A Month of Sundays (2015)
- Muriel's Wedding (1994)
- My Brilliant Career (1979)
- My Brother Jack (1964)
- My Mother Frank (2000)
- Mystery Road (2013)
- Goldstone (2016)

== N ==
- Nala Damayanthi (2003)
- Napoleon (1995)
- Ned Kelly (1970)
- Ned Kelly (2003)
- Never Tell Me Never (1998)
- The New Boy (2023)
- Newcastle (2008)
- Newsfront (1978)
- The Night We Called It a Day (2003)
- The Night the Prowler (1978)
- The Nightingale (2018)
- Noise (2007)
- The Nostradamus Kid (1992)
- The Nugget (2002)
- Nugget Is Dead?: A Christmas Story (2024)

== O ==
- The Odd Angry Shot (1979)
- Oddball (2015)
- Offside (2009)
- On the Beach (1959)
- One Night the Moon (2001)
- One Perfect Day (2004)
- Opal Dream (2006)
- Orange (2010)
- Oranges and Sunshine (2010)
- Oscar and Lucinda (1997)
- Our Lips Are Sealed (2000)
- The Overlanders (1946)
- Oyster Farmer (2004)

== P ==
- Palm Beach (2019)
- Paperback Hero (1999)
- Paper Planes (2015)
- Patrick (1978)
- Patrick (2013)
- Peaches (2004)
- Peter Allen: Not the Boy Next Door (2015 miniseries)
- Picnic at Hanging Rock (1975)
- The Picture Show Man (1977)
- Playing Beatie Bow (1986)
- The Plumber (1979)
- Primal (2010)
- Proof (1991)
- The Proposition (2005)
- Puberty Blues (1981)

== Q ==
- Quigley Down Under (1990)

== R ==
- Raajakumara (2017)
- Rabbit-Proof Fence (2002)
- Race the Sun (1996)
- Radiance (1998)
- The Rage in Placid Lake (2003)
- Rams (2020)
- Razorback (1984)
- Reckless Kelly (1993)
- Red Dog (2011)

- Red Dog: True Blue (2016)
- Koko: A Red Dog Story (2019)

- Red Hill (2010)
- The Reef (2010)
- The Reef: Stalked (2022)
- The Rescuers Down Under (1990)
- Return Home (1990)
- Reverse Runner (2012)
- Ride Like a Girl (2019)
- Rikky and Pete (1988)
- Road to Nhill (1997)
- Roadgames (1981)
- Rogue (2007)
- Romper Stomper (1992)
- The Rover (2014)
- Running on Empty (1982)
- Runt (2024)

== S ==
- Sabrina, Down Under (1999 telemovie)
- Salaam Namaste (2005)
- Salt Bridge (2015)
- Sankham (2009)
- The Sapphires (2012)
- Satellite Boy (2012)
- Saving Mr. Banks (2013)
- Scooby-Doo! and the Legend of the Vampire (2002)
- Secret Bridesmaids' Business (2002)
- The Sentimental Bloke (1919)
- Sheborg Massacre (2016)
- Shame (1988)
- Shine (1996)
- The Shrimp on the Barbie (1990)
- Siam Sunset (1999)
- The Siege of Pinchgut (1959)
- Silent Partner (2001)
- The Silver Brumby (1993)
- Singh Is Kinng (2008)
- Sirens (1994)
- Sister Kenny (1946)
- Sleeping Beauty (2011)
- Slim and I (2020)
- Smiley (1956)
- Smiley Gets a Gun (1958)
- Snowtown (2011)
- Soldier (1998)
- Solo (2006)
- Somersault (2004)
- Son of a Gun (2014)
- The Sound of One Hand Clapping (1998)
- South Solitary (2010)
- La Spagnola (2001)
- Spider and Rose (1994)
- Spin Out (2016)
- Spotswood (1992)
- The Square (2008)
- Squizzy Taylor (1982)
- Stone (1974)
- Stork (1971)
- Storm Boy (1976)
- Storm Boy (2019)
- The Story of the Kelly Gang (1906)
- Strange Bedfellows (2004)
- Strictly Ballroom (1992)
- Struck by Lightning (1990)
- Suburban Mayhem (2006)
- Summer of the Seventeenth Doll (1959)
- The Sum of Us (1994)
- Sunday Too Far Away (1975)
- The Sundowners (1960)
- Sunstruck (1972)
- The Surfer (2024)
- Surfer, Dude (2008)
- Sweet As (2022)

== T ==
- Take Away (2003)
- Tank Girl (1995)
- Ten Canoes (2006)
- Thalaivaa (2013)
- Thank God He Met Lizzie (1997)
- These Final Hours (2013)
- They're a Weird Mob (1966)
- The Thorn Birds (TV miniseries)
- Those Dear Departed (1987)
- Thunderstruck (2004)
- Tim (1979)
- Tom White (2004)
- Tomorrow, When the War Began (2011)
- Top End Wedding (2019)
- Total Recall (2012)
- A Town Like Alice (1956)
- Tracks (2013)
- The Tracker (2002)
- Travelling Light (2003)
- Travelling North (1987)
- True History of the Kelly Gang (2019)
- True Love and Chaos (1997)
- Turkey Shoot (1982)
- Turkey Shoot (2014)
- The Turning (2013)
- Two Hands (1999)
- Two Fists, One Heart (2009)

== U ==
- Unbroken (2014)
- Under Capricorn (1949)
- UNindian (2015)
- Uninhabited (2010)
- Unnale Unnale (2007)

== W ==
- Wake in Fright (1971)
- Walkabout (1971)
- Walking on Water (2002)
- The Wannabes (2003)
- We Are Still Here (2022)
- We of the Never Never (1982)
- Welcome to Woop Woop (1997)
- West of Sunshine
- The Wiggles Movie (1997)
- Where the Green Ants Dream (1984)
- Windcatcher (2024)
- Winter of Our Dreams (1981)
- The Wishmas Tree (2019)
- The Wog Boy (2000)

- Wog Boy 2: Kings of Mykonos (2010)
- Wog Boys Forever (2022)

- Wolf Creek (2005)
- Wolf Creek 2 (2013)
- Wyrmwood (2014)

- Wyrmwood: Apocalypse (2021)

== Y ==
- The Year My Voice Broke (1987)
- Yolngu Boy (2001)
- You and Your Stupid Mate (2005)
- You Can't Stop the Murders (2003)
- Young Einstein (1988)

== See also ==
- List of movies based on location
- List of Australian films
- Cinema of Australia
