= Australian Film Commission =

Former Australian government film agency

- Company type: Government-owned
- Industry: Film
- Predecessor: Australian Film Development Corporation
- Founded: 7 July 1975
- Defunct: 1 July 2008
- Successor: Screen Australia
- Headquarters: Australia

The Australian Film Commission (AFC) was an Australian government agency founded in 1975 with a mandate to promote the creation and distribution of films in Australia as well as to preserve the country's film history. It also had a production arm responsible for production and commissioning of films for the government. It was superseded by Screen Australia from 1 July 2008.

== History ==
The Australian Film Commission was established by the Whitlam government on 7 July 1975 as the successor to the Australian Film Development Corporation set up by the Gorton government. In the first year of its existence, its budget was $6.5 million. The AFC acted as a funding and development agency for the Australian film industry. With the Australian Film Commission Amendment Acts passed in 1980 and 2003, the AFC shifted focus onto funding and promoting Australian film both locally, and in international markets.

The AFC was funded in part by the national government and in part from its return on investments in film production as well as interest on film development loans. It financially assisted film and television production and also produced films generally intended for government purposes, through its production arm, Film Australia, previously known as the Commonwealth Film Unit. A Film Australia feature film for children, Let the Balloon Go, was released in 1976. The Commission generally covered Australian national and Indigenous identity through film and documentaries, and had developed the Documentary Development Fellowship scheme in 1984.

For 1979 to 1980, the Commission's budget was $10 million, and received $2.5 million from its investments.

In 1998–99, Film Finance Corporation Australia was set up as a government-owned corporation and took over the major role of financing feature film and television production, with the AFC concentrating on the funding of development, marketing and research work for the media. Film Australia Limited became a separate entity.

On 1 July 2003, the Commission undertook the effect of the transfer of the National Film and Sound Archive's (NFSA, also known as ScreenSound Australia) contractual rights and obligations as enforced by the Australian Film Commission Amendment Act. The AFC introduced a "Directions" plan to guide operations of ScreenSound Australia, before it was disputed and revised in 2006 upon the change of government. The merger between ScreenSound and the AFC was reversed in 2008, with the introduction of the Screen Australia Bill 2008.

The AFC had offices in Sydney, Melbourne, Canberra and Brisbane.

The Screen Australia Bill 2008 marked the creation of the new government film agency, Screen Australia, which would merge the major government film bodies Film Finance Corporation Australia, Film Australia Limited, and the Australian Film Commission into a single body, albeit with slightly different functions, roles and financing methods. A transition team was put in place, consisting of the CEO and one senior civil servant from each agency, being: Daryl Karp and Anne Cunningham (Film Australia), Chris Fitchett and Julia Hammett-Jamart (Australian Film Commission) and Brian Rosen and Phaedon Vass (FFC). Screen Australia commenced operation in July 2008 and subsumed the Commission's role supporting and investing in Australian film and other media.

== Amalgamations ==
The Commission merged with other federal Australian film agencies and groups while it was active between 1975 and 2008.

=== 2003: ScreenSound ===
In 2003, plans to reorganise the AFC emerged when ScreenSound Australia, otherwise known as the National Film and Sound Archive of Australia (NFSA), indicated new arrangements to board positions. The Commission was merged with ScreenSound under the Howard government which was speculated by news outlets as a move to undermine cultural industries in Australia. A campaign called "Save ScreenSound Australia" was initiated.

The Australian Film Commission Amendment Act 2003 outlined the transfer of contractual rights and obligations under ScreenSound to the AFC to accommodate the reorganisation. This took effect on 1 July 2003. In December 2003, the Commission revealed its Directions plan, introducing its proposals on the future of the NFSA.

The merger introduced the National Film and Sound Archive Advisory Committee in late 2004 which succeeded the NFSA Advisory Council. The Committee included representatives of key stakeholders for the Archive and was established under the Directions plan to allow for communication between stakeholders and the Archive. The Committee had no directive powers in relation to the AFC Board and film events originally under the NFSA brand, such as the premier of ‘The Sentimental Bloke’ at the Sydney Film Festival 2004, were redirected under the Australian Film Commission’s brand.

On 12 January 2006, Kim Dalton departed from his CEO position at the Commission to the head of television at the Australian Broadcasting Corporation. The shift introduced new operations and communications between the NFSA Advisory Committee and the AFC Board which acknowledged concerns on the overriding control of the AFC over the Archive. The Directions plan had received approximately 120 submissions from stakeholders with 90% being critical of its plans. The renegotiation amended concerns over the Archive’s branding and introduced a new plan on 10 July 2006, called the Independent statutory status for the National Film and Sound Archive.

The NFSA Advisory Committee was in operation until May 2008.

=== 2008: Film Finance Corporation and Film Australia ===
In May 2007, plans for another amalgamation was prompted by the new Minister for the Arts, George Brandis. The Australian Federal Election in November 2007 saw a changeover of government to the Labor Party, but support legislation for the merge was approved on 23 March 2008. On 20 February 2008, Peter Garrett, the new Minister for Arts from the changeover, introduced the Screen Australia Bill 2008, which allowed the NFSA to move freely under its body as it was de-merged from the Commission.

On 1 July 2008, the Australian Film Commission merged with the Film Finance Corporation and Film Australia Limited to form Screen Australia. As the main film agency financially supporting the Australian screen production industry, Screen Australia acts as the combined servicer of the three agencies. The amalgamation revised interests on Australian programs such as documentaries, and Screen Australia took over the AFC’s role in commissioning the documentary sector. For example, the development and production of the National Interest Program documentaries, which were initially produced by Film Australia Ltd, resulted from the merger.

The main functions of the Australian Film Commission were carried over by the Bill, outlining Screen Australia’s duties to financially invest in "film and television development, production and distribution activities." Screen Australia also took over the Commission’s role in supporting Australian content in films, focusing on programs with high levels of artistic and cultural qualities. Other functions included providing aid to Australian filmmakers, promoting Australian films both domestically and internationally at related film festivals, trade shows and industry markets, and supporting the development of screen culture in Australia.

== Film and media contribution ==
The Australian Film Commission as well as the Film Finance Corporation (FFC) were responsible for sustaining Australian culture through film. The AFC was a leading analyst and collector of film data, and in particular, Australian audiovisual media aiming to preserve and foster the audiovisual production industry. It led opinion, outlook and policy regarding the audiovisual industry.

The Commission covered Australian content, in which Australian national and Indigenous identity was preserved and represented through film. The AFC supported the production of Australian history as constructed by filmmakers through documentaries. In 2000 Sally Riley was appointed head of the Indigenous Branch, which later became the Indigenous Department of Screen Australia. In both roles, she did much to develop the careers of Indigenous Australian creatives and other industry professionals.

Whilst working closely with the NFSA, the Australian Film Commission financed the Archive's first major film reconstruction, of the 1927 film, For the Term of His Natural Life, in 1980.

The Commission has also collaborated with the agencies Australia Council for the Arts and the Australian Film Television and Radio School (AFTRS) in support of the rising use of internet and technological innovation in the late 1990s and early 2000s.

From the mid-1950s, with the rise of television, until the 1980s, documentary production of Australian life was supported by federal agencies such as the Commission. The AFC continued to support Australian documentaries until 2008, when Screen Australia was formed. Screen Australia overtook the Commission's responsibilities in supporting films and television programs with Australian content, which were determined by the subject matter, location of production, nationalities of contributors to the making of the film, and potential to be significant Australian content, as outlined in the Screen Australia 2008 Bill.

== Operations in Australia ==
The Commission functioned as a producer, promoter, and distributor of Australian film. In the early 1970s, the Australian Film Development Corporation in conjunction with the Australian Film Commission administered grants and loans which sustained the production of films in Australia. The AFDC, turned AFC, invested $3,289,752 in feature production between 1972 and 1975.

The Commission supported the Australian independent documentary sector. In 1984, the AFC initiated the Documentary Fellowship scheme with an Australian Broadcasting Corporation (ABC) supported pre-sale to mobilise independent documentaries. In 1999, the Commission's Documentary Online Initiative would progress collaborations over the internet between traditional documentary filmmakers and interactive media producers. The AFC recorded that the annual average production value of documentaries in Australia was approximately $62 million between 2005 and 2006. Until 1996, documentaries in Australia were defined as an information category and were reintroduced with a renewed quota of 10 hours a year from initial release, which was later increased to 20 hours in 2008.

The AFC collaborated with ABC Online, and the radio station Triple J, to create the Stuff-Art website. Stuff-Art was devised to foster innovative and online film entertainment, encouraging participation from artists, filmmakers and interactive producers. In 1999, it won Telstra/Australian Financial Review Internet Award for the best entertainment website.

In September 2001, the AFC directed investment into the program for the development of broadband content worth approximately $2.1 million. The Commission acted as a financial aid for cultural content in Australian broadband services and for the Productivity Commission whose concerns were on "developing Australian culture, children’s programming, or quality of information and entertainment." The transfer of contractual rights of the National Sound and Film Archive to the Commission in 2003, allowed the AFC to use the Archive's brand under its name.

From 2004 the AFC and from 2008 Screen Australia's Indigenous units helped to fund the Message Sticks Indigenous Film Festival.

In 2006, the Broadband Production Initiative (BPI) was introduced by the federal government. The scheme was funded with the assistance of ABC New Media, Digital services and the AFC, totalling approximately $4 million to promote the production of innovative, educational and technological media content and projects.

By July 2008, the AFC published a new online film related database which allowed anyone access through a film "producer or director’s name, film title, subject matter, location filmed, production date and key education references." The database, after the amalgamation in 2008, was expanded under Screen Australia and was called the Find a Film Search Database and later renamed The Screen Guide. The database also enabled users to locate "Australian-made feature films, documentaries, television dramas, and interactive resources" which were curated by Australians.

== Federal Government support ==
In the 1970s, the government assisted the film industry indirectly through tax exemptions and write-offs to private investors. Film bodies, such as the Australian Film Commission, were encouraged to increase overseas sales due to the tax shelter provided by a budget increase.

Changes to the AFC Amendment Bill 1980 allowed the Commission for more flexibility in funding films under the rational program and Film Australia. Funds regarding the promotion, distribution, or broadcasting of Australian programs, were also accommodated by the Bill.

The Commission was delegated to overcome costs which had little return on both government and private investments. Under the Bill, the Commission was able to appoint its own staff. Members of the AFC were appointed on part-time basis, and to ensure flexible and efficient day-to-day operation a general manager was elected.

Upon the passing of the Australian Film Commission Amendment Act 2003, the Commission became legally responsible for the NFSA. In 2008, the AFC was then merged with two other film agencies, Film Finance Australia, and Film Australia Ltd, to form the current film agency of Australia, Screen Australia. The merge with the NFSA was reversed upon the passing of the Screen Australia Bill 2008.

== International activity ==
The Commission distributed and broadcast Australian film worldwide, namely in the United States and Europe. Australian independent documentary producers sold their work to the BBC and American PBS as they were unable to sell to Australian television networks. Notably, the Documentary Fellowship scheme the AFC developed in 1984 helped place Australian documentaries into timeslots for Australian television networks, as detailed in the Australian Content Inquiry Discussion Paper, 1987.

=== Operations in the United States ===
Due to the lower valuation of the Australian dollar to the American dollar, American majors became interested in Australian films in the late 1970s. Investment in Australian film was financially attractive to American backers, and the Australian Film Commission, as well as other state film authorities, began to sell Australian films in the American market. The American market received Australian film with depictions of outback landscapes, and historical settings as impressions of Australia.

In 1978, AFC moved its North American office from its original location in New York City to Los Angeles.

=== Operations in Europe ===
In 1975, with assistance from the Australian Federal Government, the Australian Film Commission began to send Australian films and filmmakers to Cannes, France. Cannes is renowned for hosting annual international film festivals as of 1946. In 1978, the Commission’s marketing efforts in Cannes were criticised by David Stratton, a film critic and consultant, for the slogan "Our Product’s Got Great Legs" captioned under a photo of a woman’s legs.

== List of former chairs ==
- Ken Watts (1975–1981)
- Sir James Cruthers (1981–1984)
- Phillip Adams (1984–1988)
- Patrick Condon (1975–1977)
- Sue Milliken (1994–1997)

== Filmography ==
Listed on Screen Australia's Screen Guide, the online database of Australian film productions and co-productions, are 16 titles which the Australian Film Commission has contributed to either domestically in Australia, or internationally.

Filmography
Year of Production Completion	Title	Film Type	Contribution
1976	Promised Woman	Feature	International Sales Contact
1976	Summer of Secrets	Feature	International Sales Contact
1982	Duet for Four	Feature	International Sales Contact
1984	One Night Stand	Feature	International Sales Contact
1985	The Boy Who Had Everything	Feature	International Sales Contact
1991	Uranus	Short film	Australian Sales Contact
1993	Australian Women's Archival project	Documentary	International Sales Contact
1994	Microdocs	Documentary	International Sales Contact
1995	Eat My Shorts	TV drama	International Sales Contact
1995	Smile A Ton	Short film	Australian Sales Contact, International Sales Contact
1995	Tapeworm	Short film	Australian Sales Contact, International Sales Contact
1995	Trapped	Short film	Australian Sales Contact, International Sales Contact
1995	Why	Short film	International Sales Contact
1997	Capillary Action	Short film	Production Company
2007	Punch	Short film	Executive Producer
2007	The Visitor	Short film	Executive Producer

== See also ==
- Cinema of Australia
- Culture of Australia
