= Australian Walkabout (radio program) =

Australian radio program 1947–1950

- Genre: documentary
- Running time: 45 minutes (9:15 pm – 10:00 pm)
- Country of origin: Australia
- Language(s): English
- Home station: 2FC (regional), 2NA (national), 3AR, 4OG, 5CL, 7ZL
- Hosted by: Colin Simpson et al.
- Written by: various
- Original release: May 15, 1947 – March 1, 1949
- Audio format: monaural

Australian Walkabout, billed as a "series of fact features telling the enthralling story of Australia to-day," was broadcast by the Australian Broadcasting Commission for three years beginning on at 9:15 on Thursday, 15 May 1947, on 'Interstate' national stations 2FC and 2NA, and state radio stations 3AR. 4OG. 5CL, and 7ZL. The inaugural broadcast was Moonta, South Australia's "Little Cornwall".

== Ethos ==
The Broadcasting Commission magazine and radio schedule ABC Weekly announced the debut of Australian Walkabout in an article 'Recording History' by the editor in the 16 August 1947;

"Actuality broadcasts during the war years developed a new technique in radio. Many vivid first-hand descriptions of the battle front in both Europe and the Pacific are remembered. These broadcasts of the fighting forces were supplemented by actuality broadcasts of the home front. We heard descriptions of their work by men and women at their benches; from shipyards, aircraft factories, and food-processing plants. This technique, in an improved form, is now being followed in the A.B.C. series Australian Walkabout. Instead of presentation being confined to a city studio, broadcasting equipment is taken to the country, where first-hand interviews are obtained and local history recorded. It is a matter for regret that much of the story of the early days of Australia died with the passing of the pioneers. Australian Walkabout is designed to record the past history as well as the present. In the identical setting in which events took place, scenes are re-enacted with fidelity to detail. One week we journey over the air to Geraldton; the following week we are in Hobart or Townsville, or Wagga. City dwellers thus come to know districts which to many have only been a place on the map; country people are taken by radio into the cities. All this should bring about a better understanding between the widely separated people of Australia, and a better appreciation of each other’s problems."

== Subject matter ==
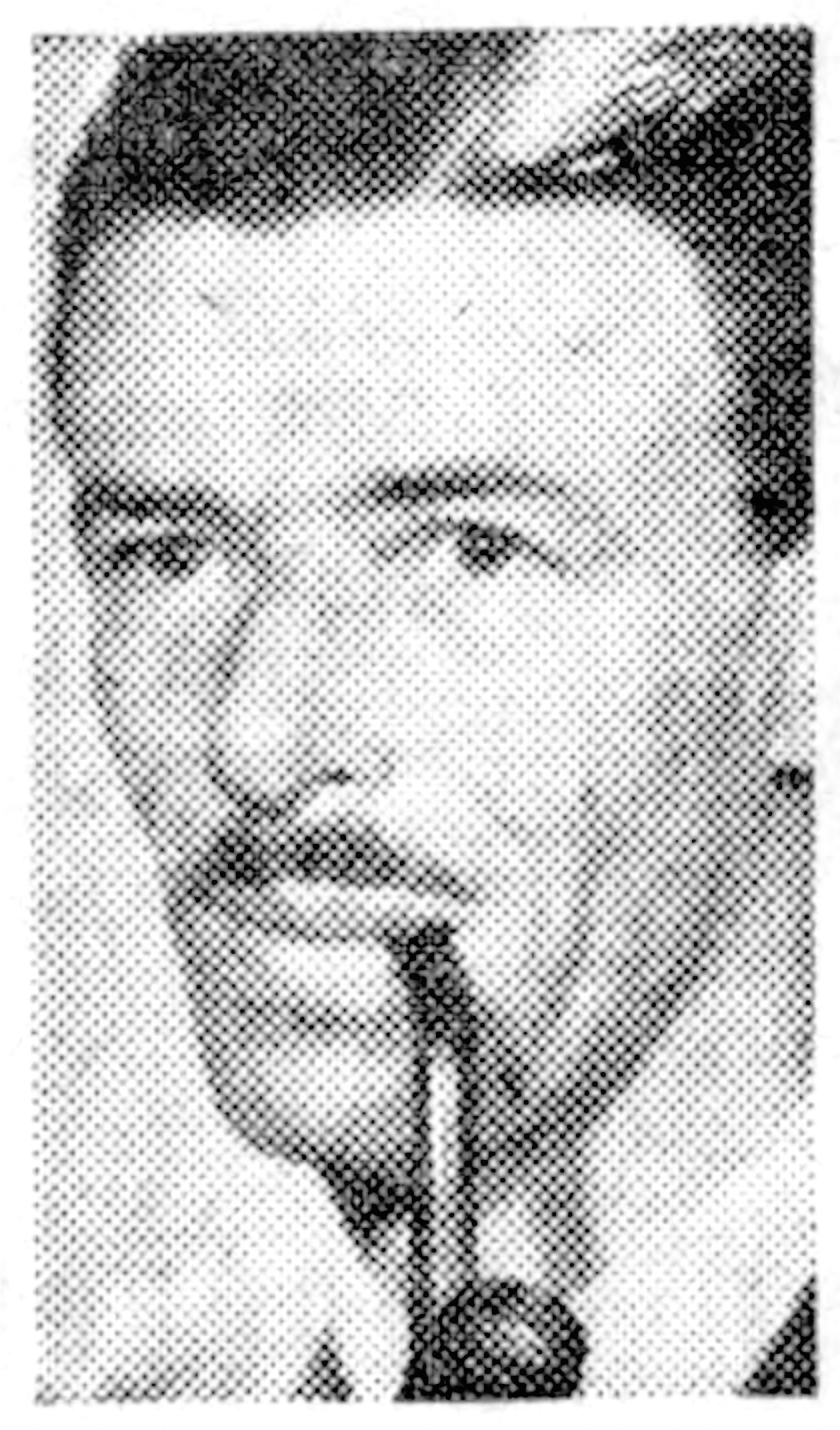
Colin Simpson in 1948

The program used wire recorders to capture live sound and its "authoritative" documentaries were recorded and broadcast all over Australia. Among them were some created by the journalist Colin Simpson, which he taped in Arnhem Land and the Tiwi Islands, recording "Aboriginal rituals and songs never before heard on Australian radio... along with Australian birdlife." For "Death Rite for Mabalung," broadcast on the interstate network on 15 March 1949, Simpson recorded a mourning ceremony at Delissaville, in the Northern Territory. In another of Simpson's recordings in Tasmania;

"Listeners will be taken through the huge modern paper mill where great logs come in, six feet across and 370 years old, are cut up in a matter of minutes, then ground to pulp to go through a remarkable machine process in the paper mill."

Other contributors included Dymphna Cusack who in 1947 wrote and presented Newcastle : Blood on Coal; Bulletin cartoonist Oswald Pryor, who contributed to a series on copper mining at Moonta, South Australia; novelist George Farwell ("Mildura : They Built Upon Sand").

== Episodes ==
The broadcasts include;

- 1947, 15 May, 9:15 pm: Moonta, South Australia's "Little Cornwall", on the copper mining town
- 1947, 19 June, 9:15 pm: Wagga Wagga, by Colin Simpson
- 1947, 26 June, 9:15 pm: Geraldton, history, WW2 evacuations ahead of feared Japanese invasion. Produced by John Cairns, written by poet, playwright Alexander Turner
- 1947, 21 August, 9:15 pm: Lismore, pres. Colin Simpson
- 1947, 30 August, 9:15 pm: Newcastle : Blood on Coal, pres. Dymphna Cusack
- 1947, 18 September, 9:15 pm: Bendigo, The Golden City by Fitzmaurice Hill, broadcast from the Melbourne Showgrounds
- 1947, 25 September, 9:15 pm: The Derwent Valley : Paper and Pride, on the Australian Newsprint Mills at Boyer, by Colin Simpson
- 1947, 16 October, 9:15 pm: George Farwell pres. Mildura : They Built Upon Sand, on the Chaffey Brothers' irrigation project
- 1947, 30 October, 9:15 pm: Tasmanian Tiger Country, by Colin Simpson
- 1947, 6 November, 9:15 pm: Lord Howe Island, recorded by Frank Legg, with P.M.G. sound recordist Dave Tapp
- 1947, 4 December, 9:15 pm: Yallourn

== Response ==
Australian Walkabout was frequently the subject of congratulatory letters in the ABC Weekly, some remarking on the educational value of the program. The ABC responded in 1948 by bring the broadcast forward an hour to 8pm so that children could listen.

== Demise ==
The series ran until March 1949. In 1958, after the advent of television broadcasting in Australia the ABC produced a TV version with a similar remit, also called Australian Walkabout sponsored by the British Broadcasting Corporation, filmed by Charles and Elsa Chauvel and produced by the BBC's Alan Sleath.
