= Robert Tudawali =

Australian actor

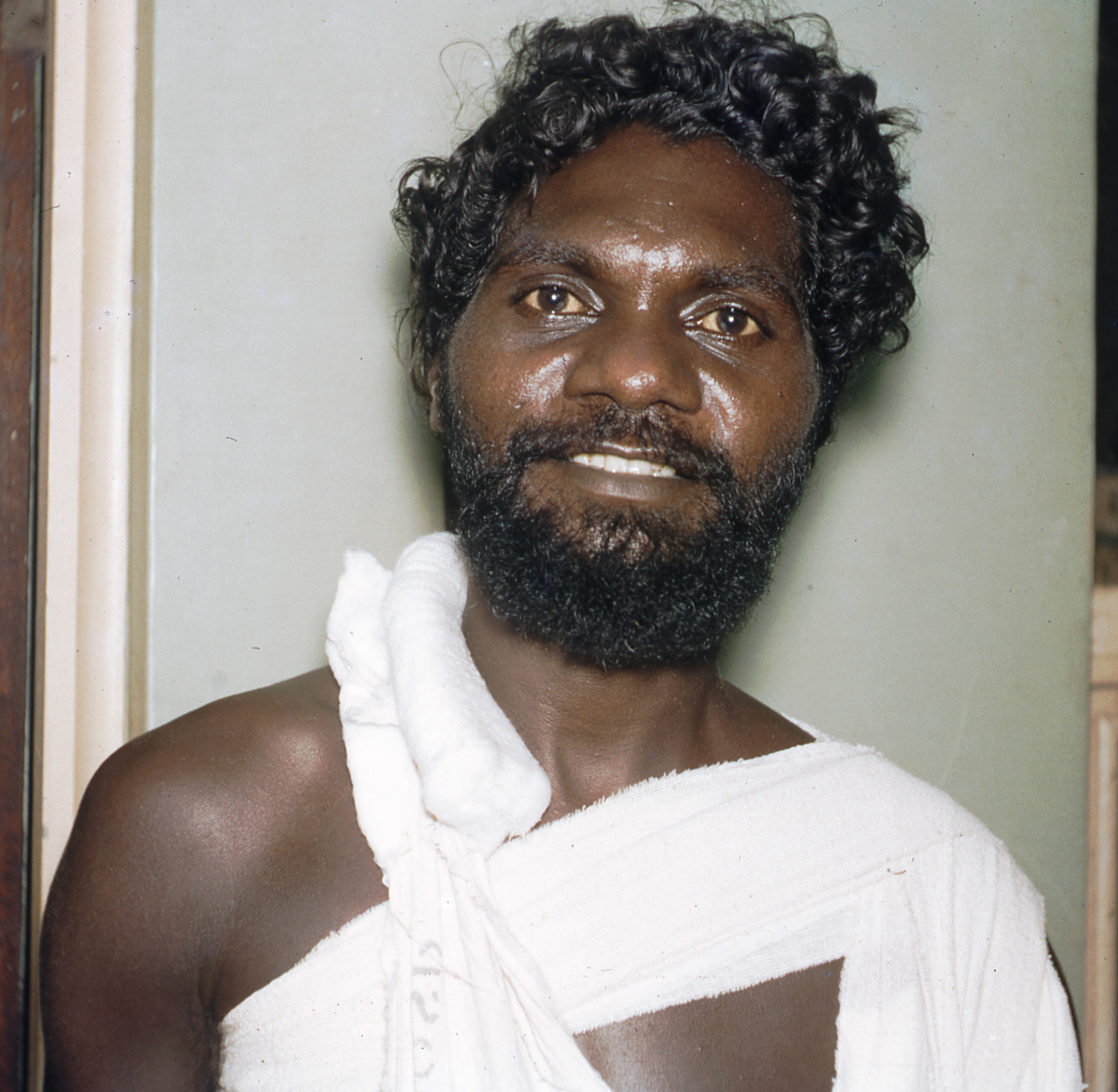
- Tudawali in 1955
- Born: Robert Tudawali; 1929; Melville Island, Northern Territory, Australia
- Died: 26 July 1967 (aged 37–38); Darwin, Northern Territory, Australia
- Resting place: Darwin Cemetery
- Occupations: Actor, activist

Robert Tudawali (1929 – 26 July 1967), also known as Bobby or Bob Wilson, was an Australian actor and Indigenous activist. He is known for his leading role in the 1955 Australian film Jedda, a role for which he was specifically chosen by the film's director, Charles Chauvel and his wife Elsa, and which made him the first Indigenous Australian film star, Tudawali served as vice-president of the Northern Territory Council for Aboriginal Rights.

The Tudawali Indigenous Film and Television Awards (Tudawali Awards) continue to recognise his legacy and award outstanding achievements of Indigenous people within the Australian film industry.

== Early life ==
Tudawali was born and raised on Melville Island in the Northern Territory to Tiwi parents.

Although he had only a basic education in Kahlin Compound and Half Caste Home in Darwin, Tudawali gained a rich English vocabulary. He was a leading Australian rules footballer as a youth, and he alternated several times between Aboriginal and white society. He used the name Bobby Wilson in Darwin when he travelled there by canoe in the late 1930s, using the surname of his father's employer. He was an orderly with the Royal Australian Air Force, worked briefly in an army store and mechanical workshop, and also as a waiter before becoming an actor.

== Actor and activist ==
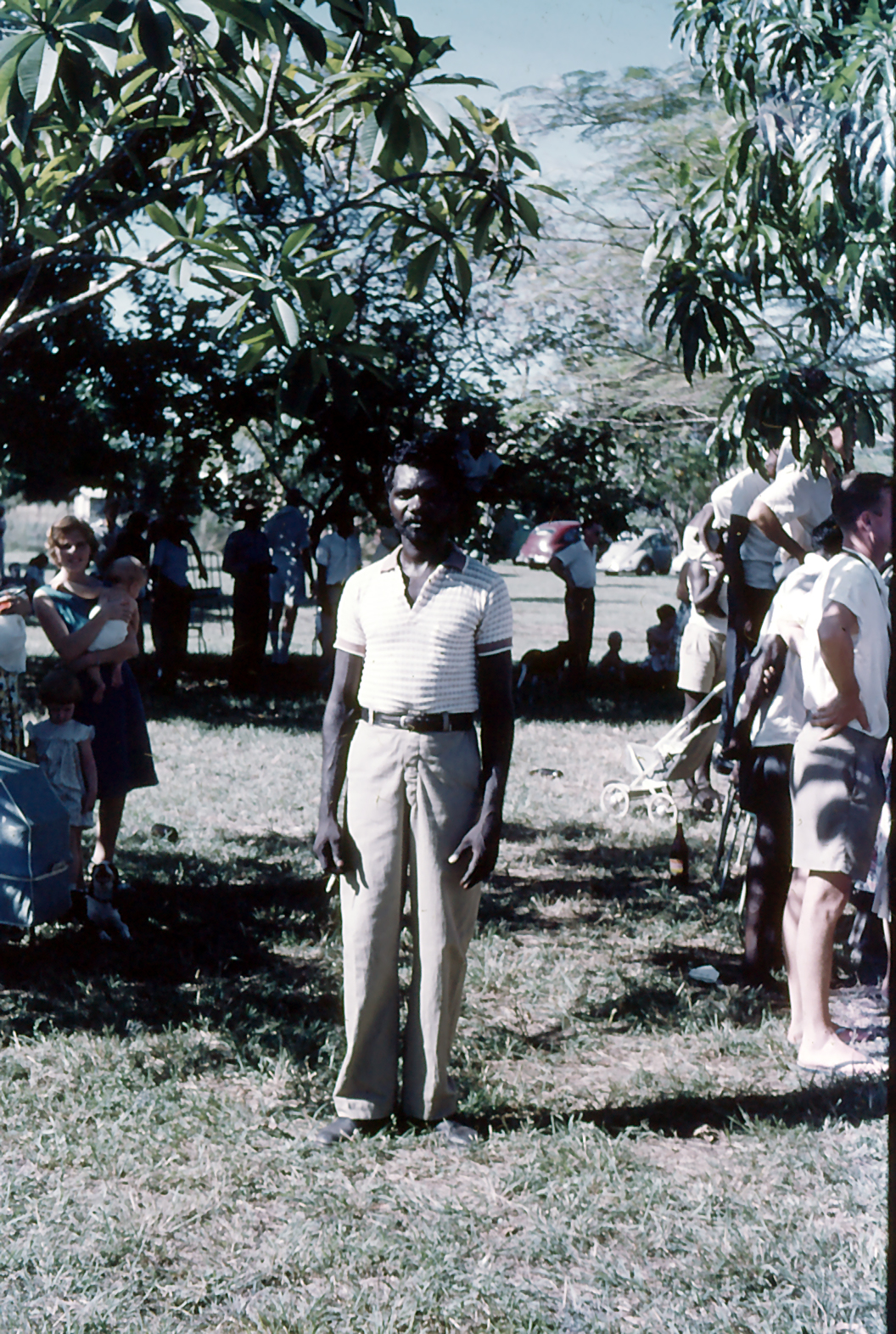
Tudawali at Bagot Aboriginal Reserve, 1960

Tudawali became the first Indigenous Australian film star as a result of playing the lead role, Marbuck, in the 1955 Australian film Jedda. In 1958 he played the role of Emu Foot in Dust in the Sun, a mystery film adapted from the novel Justin Bayard by Jon Cleary and produced by the team of Lee Robinson and Chips Rafferty.

Under the name Bobby Wilson, he took part in various episodes of the 1960 TV series Whiplash, and featured in the ABC television play Burst of Summer in 1961. It has been argued Tudawali's role in the latter was closest to his real personality.

Tudawali served as vice-president of the Northern Territory Council for Aboriginal Rights in 1966 and, working with activist Dexter Daniels, trade unionist and activist Brian Manning and author Frank Hardy, fought to highlight the poor wages and conditions of Aboriginal stockmen in the Northern Territory, which culminated in the Wave Hill walk-off in 1966. Tudawali had organised to give a series of talks to unionists throughout Australia in support of the stockmen when the Northern Territory administration banned any travel by Tudawali due to the tuberculosis he was suffering at the time.

== Personal and later life ==
Tudawali was married to Peggy Wogait in 1948 and they lived at the Bagot Aboriginal Reserve (where all of the residents of Kahlin had been moved in 1938); later he married a woman named Nancy.

He died of tuberculosis and severe burns at Darwin Hospital on 26 July 1967, following an incident at Bagot where an argument had broken out when he refused to offer his 11-year-old daughter Christine for marriage.

His funeral took place at Nightcliff, Northern Territory.

== Filmography ==
- Jedda (1955) as Marbuck
- Dust in the Sun (1955) as Emu Foot
- Whiplash (1959–1960, Seven Network, TV series) as Kuanspa / Kuraba / Mundaru / Kogarah / Dalgowlie / Native Boy / Roonga (final appearance)
- TV adaptation of the play Burst of Summer (1961, ABC Television), by Oriel Gray, based on the story of Ngarla Kunoth, who played the lead role in Jedda. Tudawali was flown from Darwin to Melbourne to make this first appearance in a live television drama. as Don Reynolds

== Legacy ==
In 1987, Steve Jodrell directed Tudawali, a made-for-television docu-drama about the man, with Ernie Dingo in the title role.

In about 1993, the Media Resource Centre announced a new award for Indigenous film-making, called the Tudawali Award.
