= National Indigenous Human Rights Awards =

Australian annual Indigenous awards

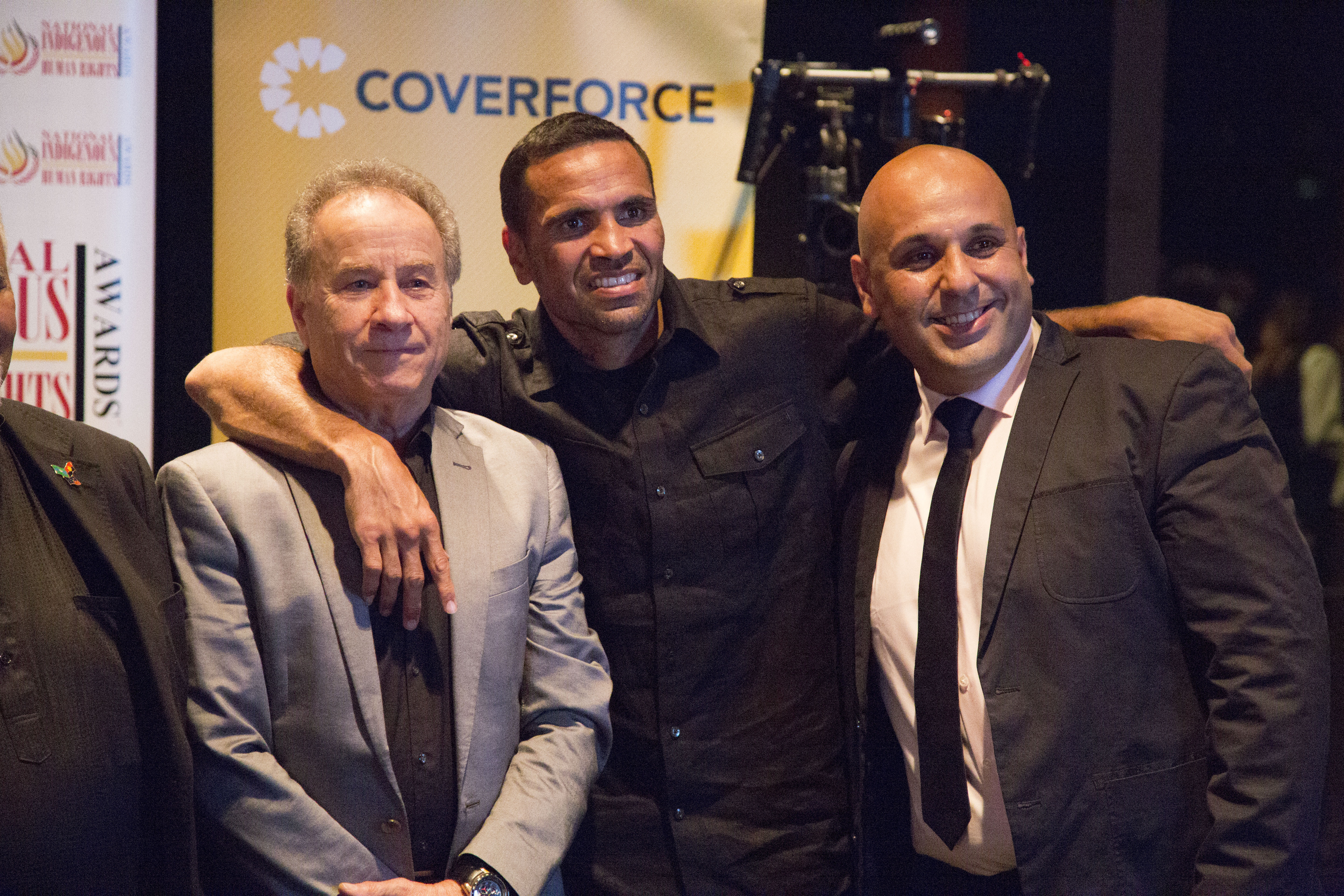
Anthony Mundine (centre) at the National Indigenous Human Rights Awards, Sydney, 2015.

The National Indigenous Human Rights Awards are annual Australian awards that recognise the contribution of Indigenous Australians to human rights and social justice. The ceremony takes place in Sydney, New South Wales.

== History ==
The National Indigenous Human Rights Awards were launched at the end of June 2014 at New South Wales Parliament, at the instigation of NSW parliamentarian Shaoquett Moselmane.

== Description ==
The award ceremony is first national Australian award ceremony dedicated solely to Indigenous human rights achievements.

There are three categories of awards:

- The Dr Yunupingu Award for Human Rights, in honour of musician and educator Mandawuy Yunupingu
- The Eddie Mabo Award for Social Justice, in honour of Indigenous land rights campaigner Eddie Mabo
- Anthony Mundine Award for Courage, in honour of boxer Anthony Mundine

== 2014 awards ==
The inaugural National Indigenous Human Rights Awards were held on 24 June at Parliament House, Sydney. Indigenous leaders from all over Australia travelled to Sydney for the event. The ceremony was emceed by Deputy Leader of the Opposition, Linda Burney, with a keynote speech by Yalmay Yunupingu. The presenters of the awards were Yalmay Yunupingu, the wife of Dr Mandawuy Yunupingu, founder and lead singer of Yothu Yindi, and Gail Mabo, daughter of Eddie Mabo, and world champion boxer Anthony Mundine. The awards were founded by NSW Labor Parliamentarian, Shaoquett Moselmane.

The inaugural recipient of the Dr Yunupingu Award for Human Rights was Rosalie Kunoth-Monks.

The inaugural recipient of the Eddie Mabo Award for Social Justice was family of Eddie Murray.

The inaugural recipient of the Anthony Mundine Award for Courage was Barbara McGrady.

== 2015 awards ==
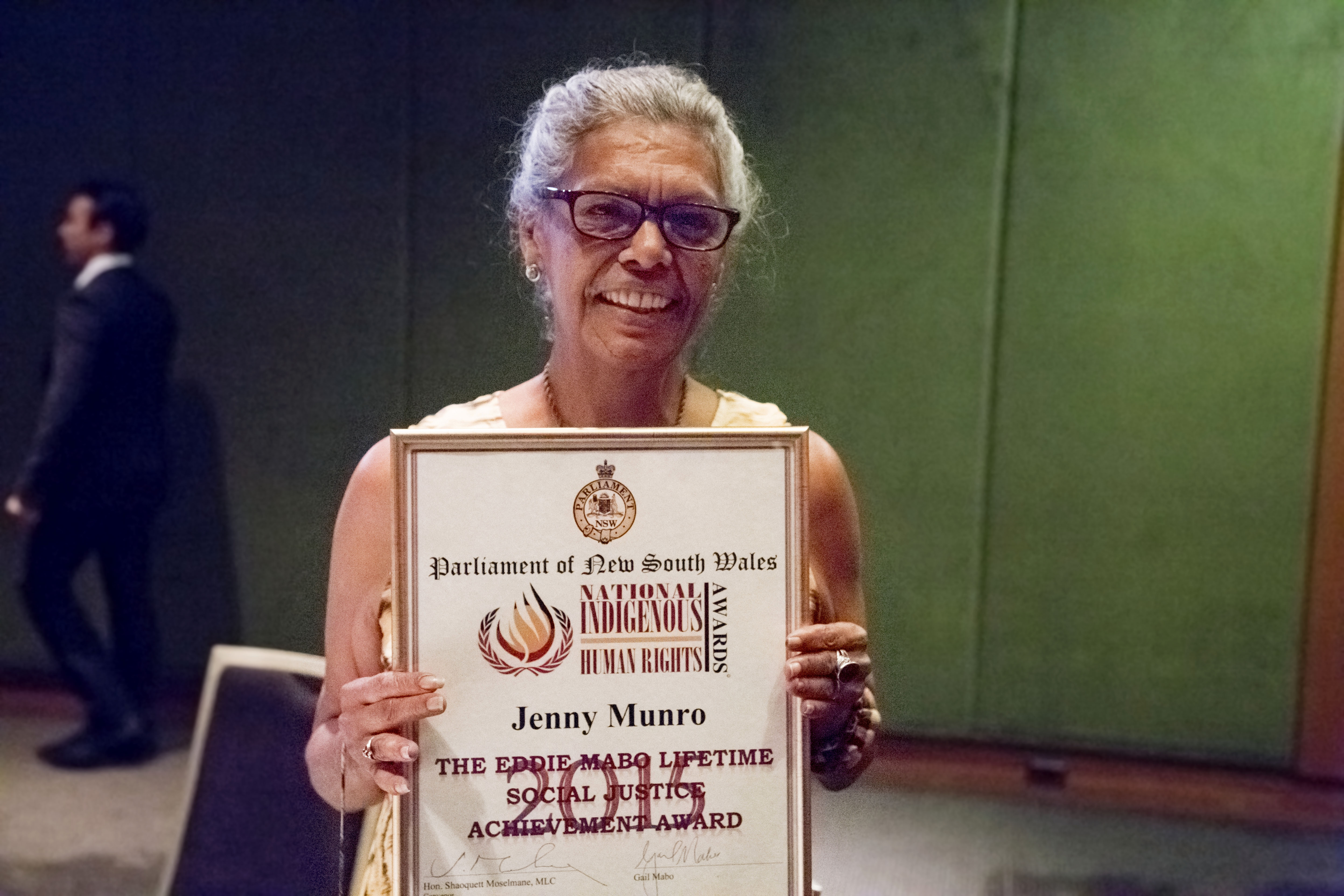
Jenny Munro holding her award at the National Indigenous Human Rights Awards

The 2015 awards were emceed by SBS journalist and Arrernte woman Karla Grant. The keynote speech was delivered by Narungga elder Tauto Sansbury.

The recipient of the Dr Yunupingu Award for Human Rights was Tauto Sansbury.

The recipient of the Eddie Mabo Award for Social Justice was Jenny Munro.

The recipient of the Anthony Mundine Award for Courage was Adam Goodes.

== 2016 awards ==
The recipient of the Dr Yunupingu Award for Human Rights was Dameyon Bonson.

Dameyon Bonson handed back the award in February 2018 in protest of homophobic comments by Anthony Mundine in a TV reality show.

The recipient of the Eddie Mabo Award for Social Justice was Mervyn Eades.

The recipient of the Anthony Mundine Award for Courage was Lex Wotton.

== 2017 awards ==
The 2017 awards night was emceed by former international journalist and filmmaker Jeff McMullen. The keynote was presented by Senator Malarndirri McCarthy. There was a judge's toast speech by Narrungga elder, Tauto Sansbury. There were 12 finalists for the three categories; For the Dr Yunupingu Human Rights Award, 4 finalists, Rachel Perkins, award winning filmmaker, Dr Mark Wenitong, a medical doctor in Cape York, Mervyn Eades, founder and CEO of Ngalla Maya and Dr Kerry Arabena, early childhood academic. For the Eddie Mabo Social Justice Award, 4 finalists, Dr Kim Isaacs, a medical doctor in the Kimberley, Gayili Marika Yunupingu, suicide prevention campaigner, Richard Weston, CEO of The Healing Foundation and Noeletta McKenzie, youth suicide prevention worker. For the Anthony Mundine Courage Award, 4 finalists, Dr Meg Wills, justice reinvestment campaigner, Professor Chris Sarra, founder of Stronger Smarter Institute, Joe Williams, suicide prevention advocate and Clinton Pryor, who walked across Australia to raise awareness to continuing injustices to Indigenous people.

The recipient of the Dr Yunupingu Award for Human Rights was Mervyn Eades.

The recipient of the Eddie Mabo Award for Social Justice was Gayili Marika Yunupingu.

The recipient of the Anthony Mundine Award for Courage was Professor Chris Sarra.

== 2018 awards ==
The 5th National Indigenous Human Rights Awards were held on 18 October at Parliament House, Sydney. The ceremony was emceed by NITV journalist Karla Grant and with a keynote speech by Noongar person, lawyer and National Indigenous Critical Response Service advocate Megan Krakouer.

The recipient of the Dr Yunupingu Award for Human Rights was Megan Krakouer.

The recipient of the Eddie Mabo Award for Social Justice was Keenan Mundine.

The recipient of the Anthony Mundine Award for Courage was Clinton Prior.
