= Commonwealth Jubilee play competition =

1951 Australian play competition

The Commonwealth Jubilee play competition was a 1951 Australian play competition held to celebrate Australia's Jubilee Year. The competition was for the best plays dealing with the Australian life or an Australian character and was organized by the Jubilee Federal Arts Sub-Committee.

The competition encouraged Australian playwriting at a time when few Australian plays were presented on stage and were thus generally unprofitable for playwrights, with The Bulletin lamenting that "the nation's literary energy...has gone where it can find a market: into the novel and short story".

230 plays were entered into the competition. The judges were Professor Keith Macartney of Melbourne University, Lindsey Browne, a The Sydney Morning Herald drama critic, and Frank Harvey, senior drama producer for the Australian Broadcasting Commission.

== Winners ==
- First prize (£500) – Tether a Dragon by Kylie Tennant - about Alfred Deakin
- Second prize (£200) – The House that Jack Built by George Farwell - about the Rum Rebellion
- Special mention – Granite Peak by Betty Roland, Sing for St. Ned by Ray Mathew, and History of Burke and Wills by John Sandford

== Legacy ==
A year after the competition, none of the plays had been picked up by commercial theatre groups. With the hope of promoting some of the plays being presented, the Jubilee Federal Arts Sub-Committee sent four plays to about twenty production groups in Australia. Though the Sub-Committee's efforts were unsuccessful, two of the awarded plays—George Farwell's and John Sandford's—were adapted for ABC Radio.
