= Screen test (disambiguation) =

Screen test may refer to:

- Screen test, the practice or evaluation of actors, make-up, and lighting in film
- Screen Test (film), a 1937 short Australian documentary directed by Charles Chauvel
- Rough ride (police brutality), also called a screen test, in which an unrestrained prisoner is thrown about an erratically-driven police vehicle
- Screen Tests, a series of "living portrait" films created by Andy Warhol
- Screen Test, a children's film-clip game show on BBC television
- Don Adams' Screen Test, an American game show that aired during 1975-76
