= Power to Win =

Power to Win may refer to:

- Power to Win (song), the Port Adelaide Football Club song
- Power to Win (film), a 1942 short Australian documentary
