= Rosalie Kunoth-Monks =

Aboriginal Australian actress and activist (1937–2022)

Rosalie Kunoth-Monks OAM
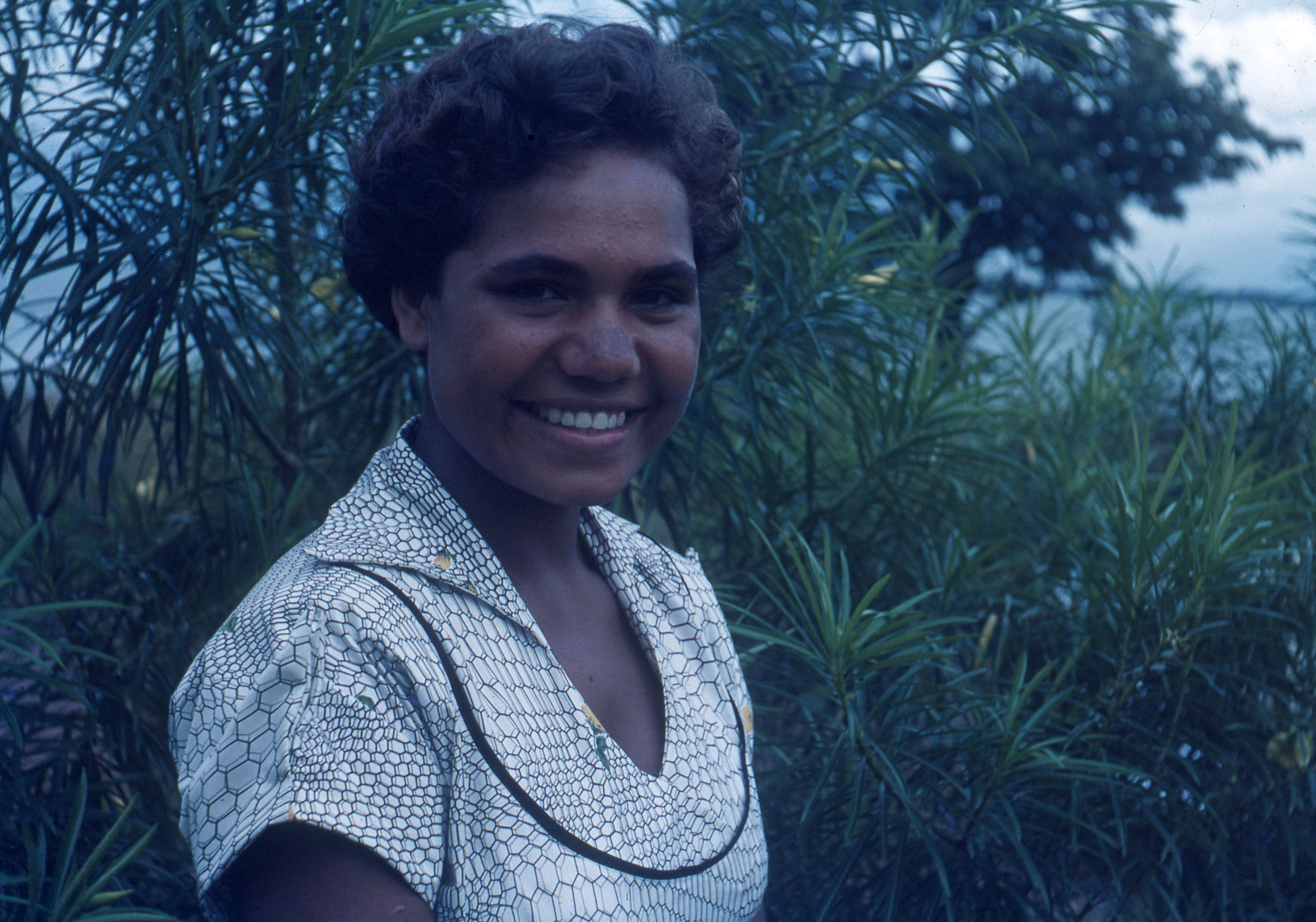
- Kunoth-Monks in 1955
- Born: Rosalie Lynette Kunoth; 4 January 1937; Utopia, Northern Territory
- Died: 26 January 2022 (aged 85); Alice Springs, Northern Territory
- Other names: Ngarla Kunoth (screen name); Rosie (nickname)
- Occupations: Actress, activist, politician

Rosalie Lynette Kunoth-Monks (4 January 1937 – 26 January 2022), also known as Ngarla Kunoth, was an Australian film actress, Aboriginal activist and politician.

== Early life ==
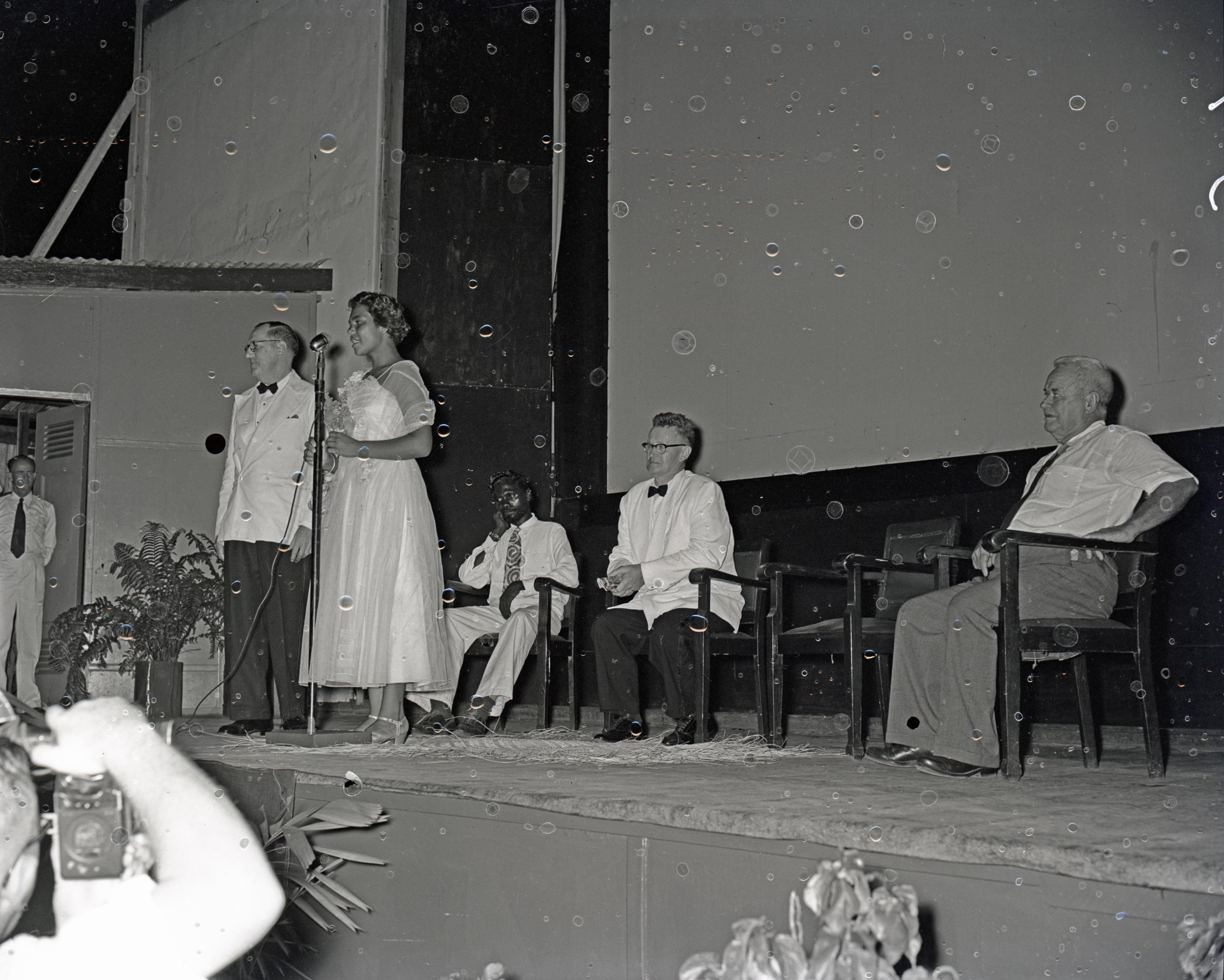
Kunoth-Monks speaking at the world premiere of Jedda in Darwin in 1955

Rosalie Lynette Kunoth was born on 4 January 1937 in Utopia, Northern Territory (Arapunya), she was an Arrernte and Anmatyerre woman. Her paternal grandfather, Harry Kunoth, was German, hence her German surname. He and her grandmother, Amelia Kunoth (an Arrernte woman), co-managed several cattle stations in the Northern Territory, including Utopia Station. Her father's name was Allan Kunoth.

In an interview for Film Australia's Australian Biography series in 1995 Kunoth-Monks stated that she was born on the Sandover River and that her Anmatyerr mother, whose name she didn't state due to cultural reasons, was assisted in her birth by an Aboriginal midwife. Her mother was a Ngarla woman, within Aboriginal kinship, and Kunoth-Monks stated that there were a group of Ngarla women that are her mother also. She was one of eight children and she grew up speaking both Arrernte and Anmatyerr and learnt English as a third language, with her father beginning to teach her in the lead-up to her attending school.

At the age of 9 Kunoth-Monks was sent to St. Mary's Hostel in Alice Springs as a boarder and attended school in town. This was during a period that many "part-Aboriginal" children were taken from their families as a part of the Stolen Generations, but this wasn't the case for her due to the protection afforded her by her family. This is because the Kunoths were well-known in the pastoral industry and her parents were able to pay board for the children. This does not mean that they were given the choice to educate her at home or more locally.

Kunoth-Monks was initially concerned that she would be boiled to make her skin lighter, and stated that: "It took one horrifying week of expecting to be boiled and then realising that kids did go to this place called school, and they were brown or even darker. And we didn't get boiled".

== Acting career ==
In 1951, Kunoth was 14 and staying at St Mary's Hostel when the filmmakers Charles and Elsa Chauvel recruited her to play the title role in their 1955 film Jedda. Her nickname was "Rosie", but the Chauvels changed her name for the screen to Ngarla Kunoth.

Kunoth was the first Indigenous Australian female lead. The groundbreaking film was played for audiences at the Cannes Film Festival 60 years later in 2015. This experience inspired the play and TV play Burst of Summer.

== Activism and politics ==
Kunoth spent 10 years from 1960 as an Anglican nun in the Community of the Holy Name in Melbourne. She then left the order, married Bill Monks and began employment at the Department of Aboriginal Affairs, setting up the first home in Victoria for Aboriginal children. She had a daughter, Ngarla.

Returning to the Alice Springs region, she worked for Aboriginal Hostels Limited, the Central Australian Aboriginal Legal Aid Service and the Aboriginal and Torres Strait Islander Commission.

The then–Chief Minister of the Northern Territory, Paul Everingham, appointed her as an adviser on Aboriginal affairs. Kunoth stood for election to the Northern Territory Legislative Assembly in 1980. She campaigned to oppose the proposed construction of a dam that threatened to destroy land sacred to her people. She lost that election but went on to continuing activism working to improve the lives of Indigenous people. In 1999 she was appointed vice chair of the council of the Batchelor Institute of Indigenous Tertiary Education and subsequently became chair of the council.

By 2008, she had returned to the Utopia homelands, 260 kilometres (160 mi) north-east of Alice Springs, and in that year became president of Barkly Shire. In August 2008, in Canberra for Amnesty International, she denounced federal government intervention in the Northern Territory as a "huge violation of human rights", displacing "more Indigenous people from their traditional lands, depriving them of opportunities to speak their native language and severing links with [their] culture. Our beings are very fragile. We disagree with being herded by the army into the big centres". Two months later, she said: "It's not that they're coming here with bulldozers or getting the army to move us. It's that they're trying to starve us out of our home... They won't support us becoming sustainable in our own right. If you're made to feel a second-class humanity, if it's not ethnic cleansing, please let me know what is". Utopia, which is known for its dot paintings, was trying to start its own cattle business and wanted to be a cultural centre, she said.

At the 2013 federal election, Kunoth-Monks stood unsuccessfully as a senate candidate in the Northern Territory on behalf of the First Nations Political Party. In November 2014, Kunoth-Monks was a significant influence in bringing together with Tauto Sansbury a national gathering of Indigenous leaders to unite in the "fight" for their lands – the "Freedom Movement" – in Alice Springs.

== Media appearances ==
On 9 June 2014 Rosalie Kunoth-Monks appeared on ABC TV's Q&A, where she delivered her withering and now well-known "I am not the problem" speech.

== Death ==
Kunoth-Monks died in Alice Springs on 26 January 2022, aged 85.

She was given a state funeral in Alice Springs on 3 March 2022, which was attended by hundreds of people. Michael Gunner, the Chief Minister of the Northern Territory, began his eulogy with her famous words from her 2014 appearance on ABC TV's Q&A: "Don't try and suppress me. I am not the problem. I have never left my country, nor have I ever ceded any part of it". Central Desert councillor Jeff Iversen described her as "a hero and a national treasure".

== Recognition and honours ==
- 1993 – Medal of the Order of Australia, for service to the Aboriginal community.
- 2001 – Victorian Honour Roll of Women
- 8 March 2007 (International Women's Day) – presented with a "Northern Territory Tribute to Women Award" at the opening of the National Pioneer Women's Hall of Fame in Alice Springs
- 26 June 2014 – Dr. Yunupingu Award for Human Rights at the inaugural National Indigenous Human Rights Awards
- 26 January 2015 – finalist for Australian of the Year after being awarded Northern Territorian of the Year
- 10 July 2015 – NAIDOC Person of the Year during the NAIDOC Week celebrations
- November 2015 – subject of a tribute song on social media, "She Came Along", composed by Paul "Nultatjarra" Dixon
