= Mabel Forrest =

Australian writer and journalist (1872–1935)

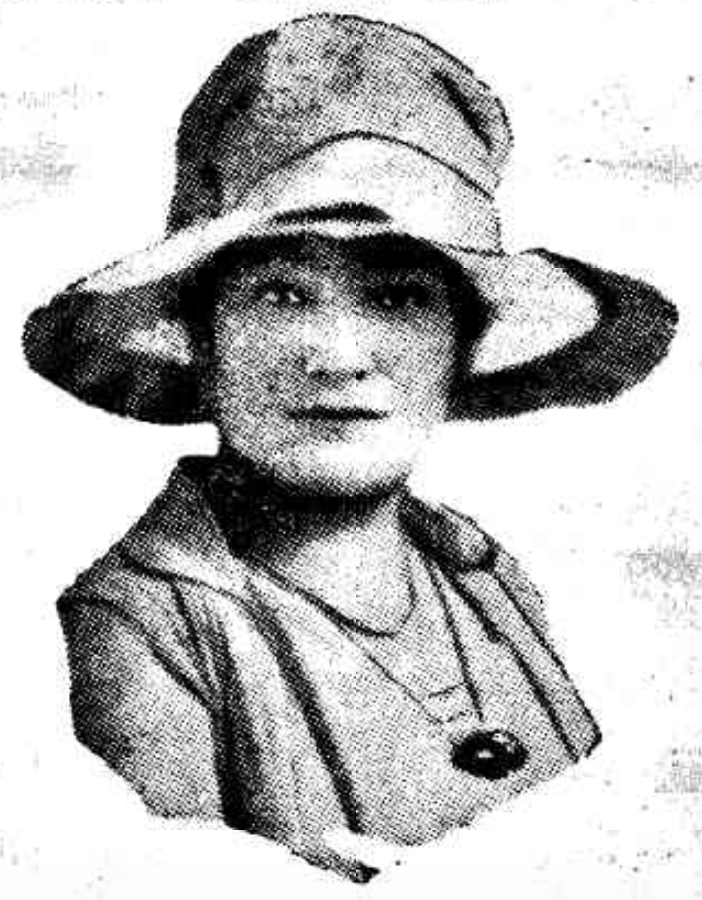
- Mabel Forrest, c. 1928
- Born: Helena Mabel Checkley Mills; 6 March 1872; Yandilla, Queensland, Australia
- Died: 18 March 1935 (aged 63); Brisbane, Queensland, Australia

Helena Mabel Checkley Forrest (6 March 1872 – 18 March 1935) was an Australian writer. Born in Queensland in 1872, she married in 1893 and began writing for newspapers to supplement her family's income. She divorced and re-married in 1902, and became a popular writer of short stories and poetry for newspapers and periodicals. Forrest also authored several novels, including The Wild Moth, which was adapted into the film The Moth of Moonbi in 1926.

== Life ==
Mabel Forrest was born near Yandilla, Queensland, on 6 March 1872. She was the daughter of the station manager James Checkley Mills and his wife Margaret Nelson (née Haxell). She was educated primarily by her mother and was raised on agricultural properties near the border between Queensland and New South Wales.

Mills married a selector named John Frederick Burkinshaw on 5 July 1893 near Goondiwindi. Forrest's husband experienced financial difficulties during their marriage, forcing her to supplement the family's income through sewing and through the publication of her writing. In 1893 she published her first book, Poems, and the following year she gave birth to a daughter. Forrest and her husband separated in 1896 and divorced in April 1902; the reason for the divorce was recorded as "adultery, desertion and cruelty".

Shortly after divorcing Burkinshaw, Forrest married a surveyor named John Forrest. She regularly wrote short stories for newspapers and periodicals, including The Australasian, The Bulletin, and The Lone Hand, and had her works appear internationally in British and American publications. A collection of her short stories was published under the title The Rose of Forgiveness in 1904, and a collection of her poetry was published as Alpha Centauri in 1909. She also wrote a play called The Highwayman.

Forrest's first novel, A Bachelor's Wife, was published in 1914. She followed this with two collections of prose and poetry: The Green Harper (1915) and Streets and Gardens (1922). In 1924 Forrest published her best-known work, a novel titled The Wild Moth, which was adapted into a film titled The Moth of Moonbi by Charles Chauvel in 1926. The adaptation drew large crowds and was Queensland's first feature film. Forrest followed The Wild Moth with four more novels: Gaming Gods (1926), Hibiscus Heart (1927), Reaping Roses (1928) and White Witches (1929).

In late 1934, Forrest attempted suicide. She died of pneumonia on 18 March 1935 in Brisbane. A plaque was installed at the Brisbane Town Hall in her honour.

== Writing and reception ==
Forrest was an extremely popular writer during her lifetime, and was described by the critic Bertram Stevens as "the most prolific writer of verse in the Commonwealth". However, the majority of her works were poorly received by contemporary critics, with the literary historian and journalist H. M. Green describing her writing as "over-facile". Her children's poems were more positively received. Following her death, Forrest's writing largely faded into obscurity.

Forrest often wrote about life in the Australian bush, as well as about modernisation and urbanisation. The literary scholar and librarian Marie-Louise Ayres notes that witches are a common theme of Forrest's poetry, and that her writing often juxtaposes the Australian natural landscape and symbols of Celtic mythology. Ayres also argues that Forrest's writing often expresses concern about flaws and weaknesses being passed down genetically and reinforces the notion that interracial relationships would lead to genetic contamination and degradation. Ayres concludes that Forrest is "a disappointment" to her, and that the early feminist themes of her poems are undermined by the ideologies that she furthers in her novels. The literary scholar Patrick Buckredge writes that Foott's early poetry features patriotic messages about the importance of developing the Australian colonies, while her later work is characterised by its conservative ideology and mythological motifs.

== Selected works ==
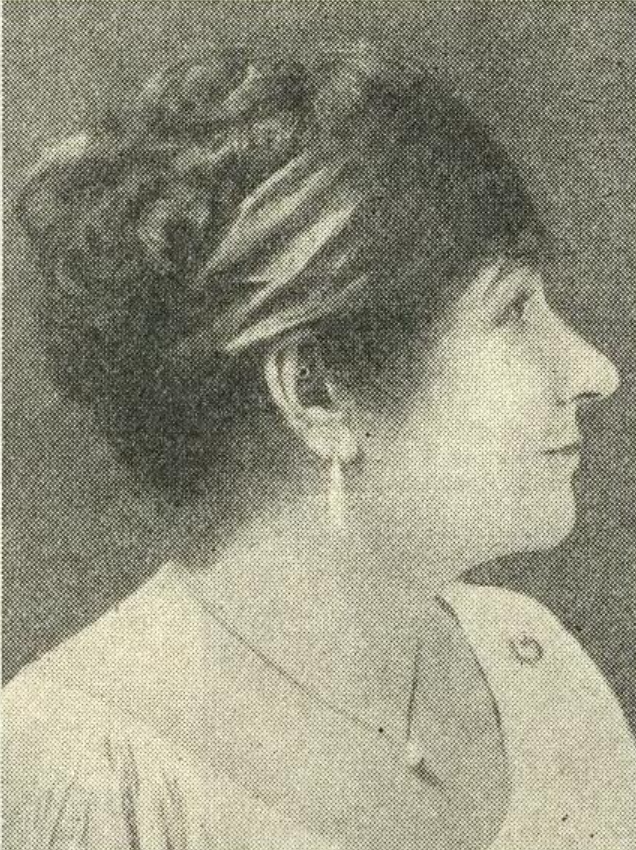
Mabel Forrest

=== Novels ===
- In a Sunny Land (1906)
- A Bachelor's Wife (1914)
- The Wild Moth (1924)
- Gaming Gods (1926)
- Hibiscus Heart (1927)
- White Witches (1927)
- Reaping Roses (1928)

=== Collections ===
- The Rose of Forgiveness, and Other Stories (1904) – short stories
- Alpha Centauri (1909) – poetry
- The Green Harper (1915) – poetry, children's fiction
- Streets and Gardens (1922) – poetry
- Poems (1927) – poetry
