= Jedda =

- Theatrical release poster
- Directed by: Charles Chauvel
- Written by: Charles Chauvel; Elsa Chauvel
- Produced by: Charles Chauvel
- Starring: Robert Tudawali; Ngarla Kunoth
- Cinematography: Carl Kayser
- Edited by: Alex Ezard; Jack Gardiner; Pam Bosworth
- Music by: Isador Goodman
- Production company: Charles Chauvel Productions Ltd
- Distributed by: Columbia Pictures
- Release dates: 3 January 1955 (premiere); 5 May 1995 (Australia); 1956 (UK)
- Running time: 101 mins (Aust); 61 mins (UK)
- Country: Australia
- Language: English
- Budget: £90,823

Jedda, released in the UK as Jedda the Uncivilised, is a 1955 Australian film written, produced and directed by Charles Chauvel. His last film, it is notable for being the first to star two Aboriginal actors, Robert Tudawali and Rosalie Kunoth-Monks (named Ngarla Kunoth for this film) in the leading roles. It was also the first Australian feature film to be shot in colour.

Jedda is often seen as an influential film in the development of Australian cinema and setting a new standard for future Australian films. It won more international attention than previous Australian films during a time when Hollywood films were dominating Australian cinema. Chauvel was nominated for the Golden Palm Award at the 1955 Cannes Film Festival but lost to Delbert Mann for Marty.

== Plot ==
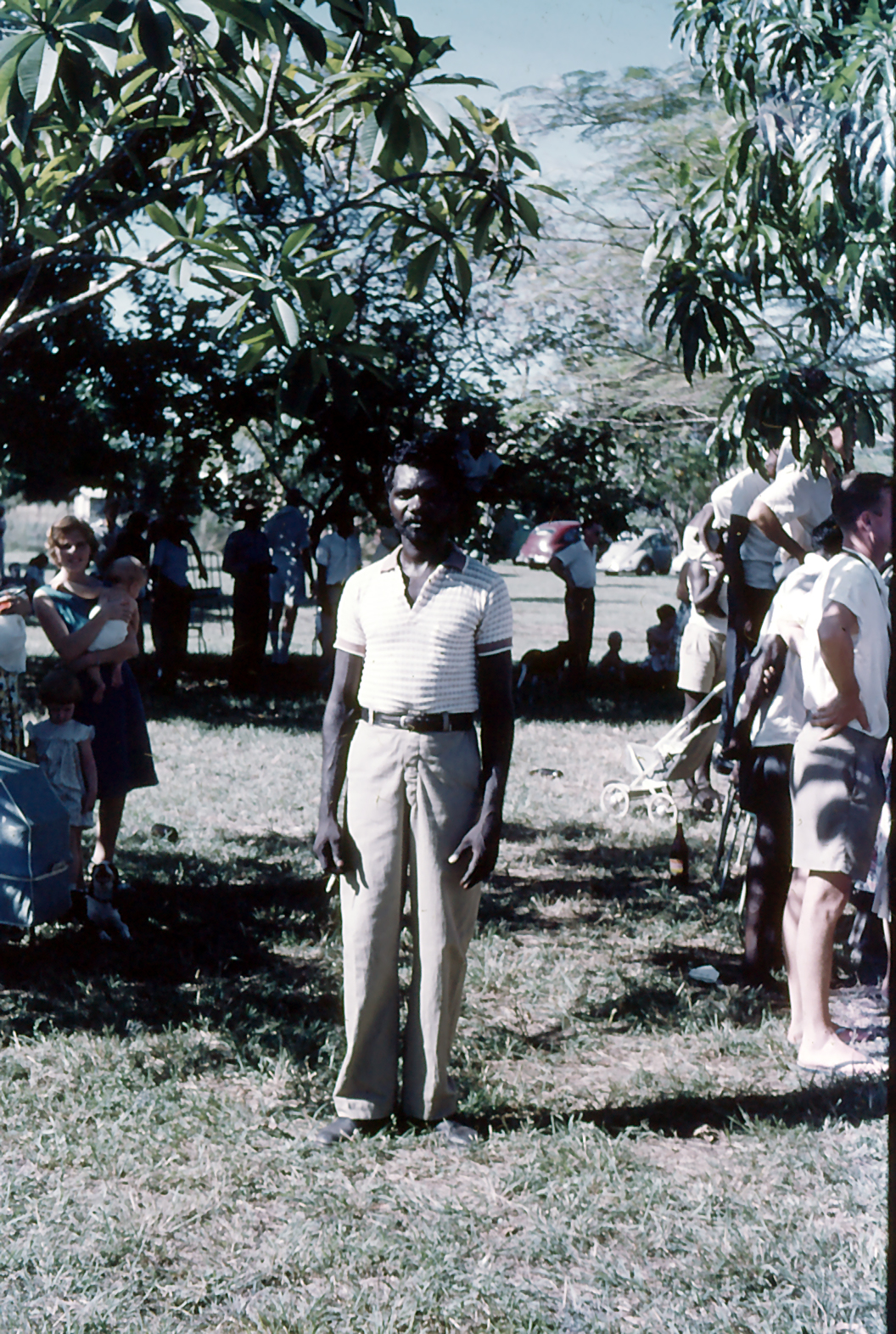
Robert Tudawali appeared as Marbuck in Jedda

Jedda is an Aboriginal girl born on a cattle station in the Northern Territory of Australia. After her mother dies giving birth to her, the child is brought to Sarah McMann, the wife of the station boss. Sarah has recently lost her own newborn to illness. She at first intends to give the baby to one of the Aboriginal women who work on the station, but then raises Jedda as her own, teaching her European ways and separating her from other Aboriginal people.

Jedda wants to learn about her own culture, but is forbidden by Sarah. When Jedda grows into a young woman, she becomes curious about an Aboriginal man from the bush named Marbuck. This tall stranger arouses strong feelings in her. She is lured to his camp one night by a song. Marbuck abducts her and sets off back to his tribal land, through crocodile-infested swamps.

Joe, a half-caste stockman in love with Jedda, tracks the two for several days. They travel across high, rocky country, and down a river until Marbuck reaches his tribe. The tribal council declares that Marbuck has committed a serious crime by bringing Jedda to them, because she is not of the right skin group. They sing his death song as punishment. Marbuck defies the elders and takes Jedda into an area of steep cliffs and canyons, taboo lands.

Driven insane by the death song, he pulls Jedda with him over a tall cliff, and both perish. Joe, the narrator, says her spirit has joined "the great mother of the world, in the dreaming time of tomorrow".

== Cast ==
- Ngarla Kunoth as Jedda
- Robert Tudawali as Marbuck
- Betty Suttor as Sarah McMann
- Paul Reynall as Joe
- George Simpson-Lyttle as Douglas McMann
- Tas Fitzer as Peter Wallis
- Hugh Wason Byers as Felix Romeo (credited as Wason Byers)
- Willie Farrar as Little Joe
- Margaret Dingle as Little Jedda

== Development ==
Charles Chauvel said the original inspiration for the film came from a meeting he had in Hollywood in early 1950 with Merian C. Cooper. Cooper encouraged the director to make a film exploiting Australian locations. Chauvel was further encouraged along these lines by Bess Meredyth, who had made a number of films in Australia in the 1920s.

Chauvel decided to make the project in the Northern Territory. With his wife Elsa he made an extensive survey of the Territory later that year with the assistance of the Commonwealth government. He undertook colour tests, intending to make Australia's first colour movie. The Chauvels then wrote a screenplay, originally entitled The Northern Territory Story.

The lead Aboriginal character was reportedly inspired by the warrior Nemarluk, who killed three Japanese pearlers in the 1930s and died in prison.

In 1951 Chauvel formed Chauvel Productions Ltd to make the film, with a notional capital of £500,000. It went public in August 1951, offering 240,000 shares.

Chauvel later stated that he turned down an American offer of $100,000 (£44,000) to finance the film because it was conditional upon Linda Darnell being cast in the lead. Chauvel's regular backers Universal Pictures did not want to invest in the movie but Chauvel managed to secure finance from various businessmen, including Mainguard Australia Ltd. It took the Chauvels 18 months to find a suitable filming location.

== Production ==
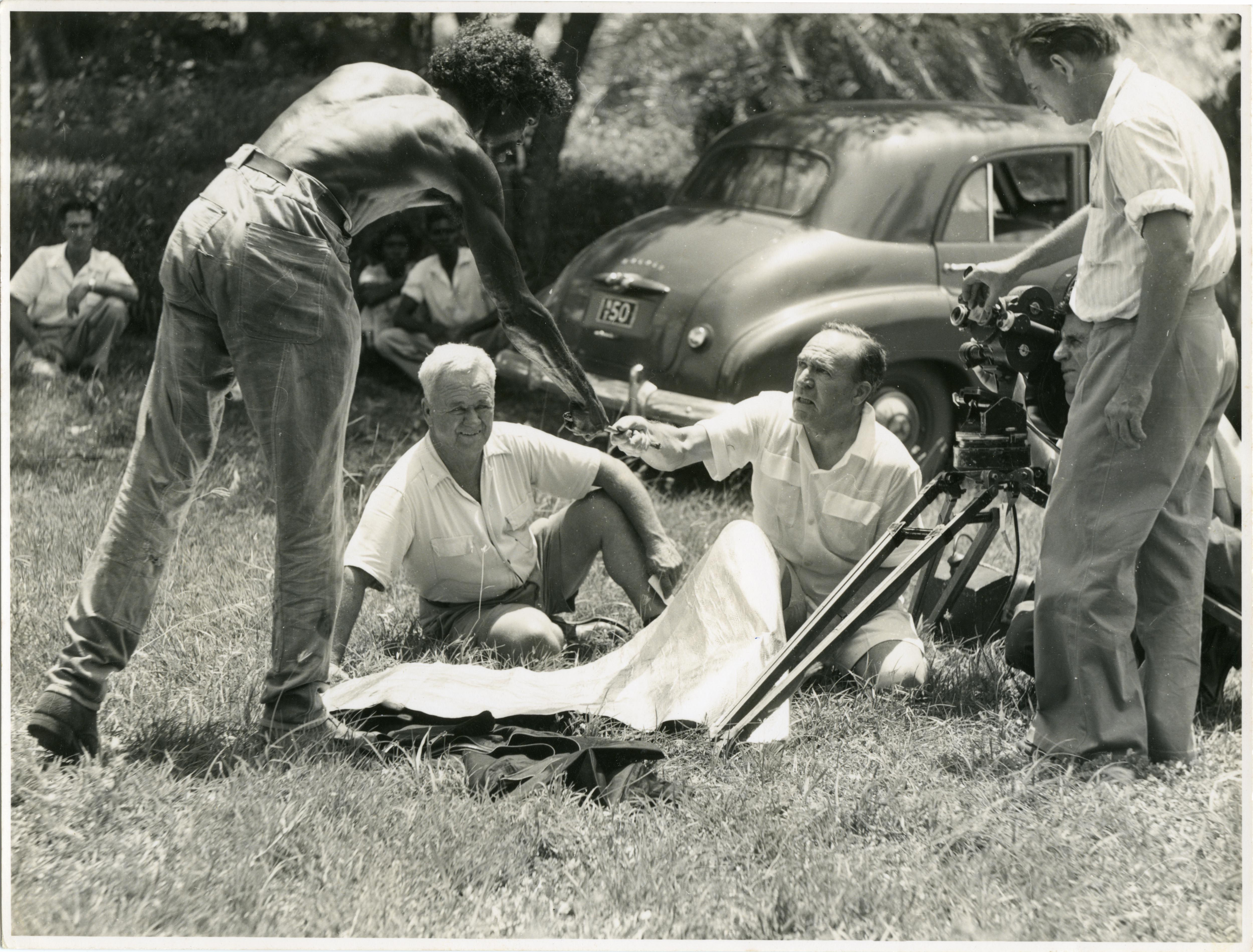
Robert Tudawali with Bill Harney and Charles Chauvel prior to the filming of Jedda.

Filming started in May 1952, when the unit left Sydney for Darwin. By this stage the lead role of Jedda had still yet to be cast, but filming acting sequences did not begin until July. Robert Tudawali was an Aboriginal man from Melville Island, the largest island in the Tiwi Islands group. Ngarla Kunoth (Rosalie Kunoth-Monks) was an Arrernte and Anmatyerre woman, born at Utopia cattle station, north east of Alice Springs; she was selected over seven other actors screen tested, and was cast by July.

The shoot took five months to complete, plus post-production work done in Sydney. Most of the scenes were shot on the Coolibah Station in the Northern Territory, as well as at Standley Chasm, Ormiston Gorge and Mary River in the north.

The production process was laborious, as the colour technique used, Gevacolor, could only be processed in England. The film stock was fragile and heat-sensitive, which was a problem in the tropical climate of the Northern Territory. During production, the film was stored in cool caves to protect it from deteriorating. By mid 1952 the film had incurred expenses of £24,673.

The last roll of negative was destroyed in a plane crash on its way for developing in England. Chauvel re-shot these lost scenes at Kanangra Walls in the Blue Mountains and Jenolan Caves west of Sydney. Cave scenes were filmed in the River Cave, Diamond Cave, Imperial Cave, and Mud Tunnels at Jenolan. Editing and sound recording were completed in London.

The music was written by Isador Goodman. Elsa Chauvel, the director's wife, replaced large parts of Goodman's score with old-fashioned commercial "mood" music.

The Chauvels celebrated their 25th wedding anniversary during filming. Wason Byers, who had a small role, was arrested for stealing over £1,000 worth of cattle.

== Reception ==
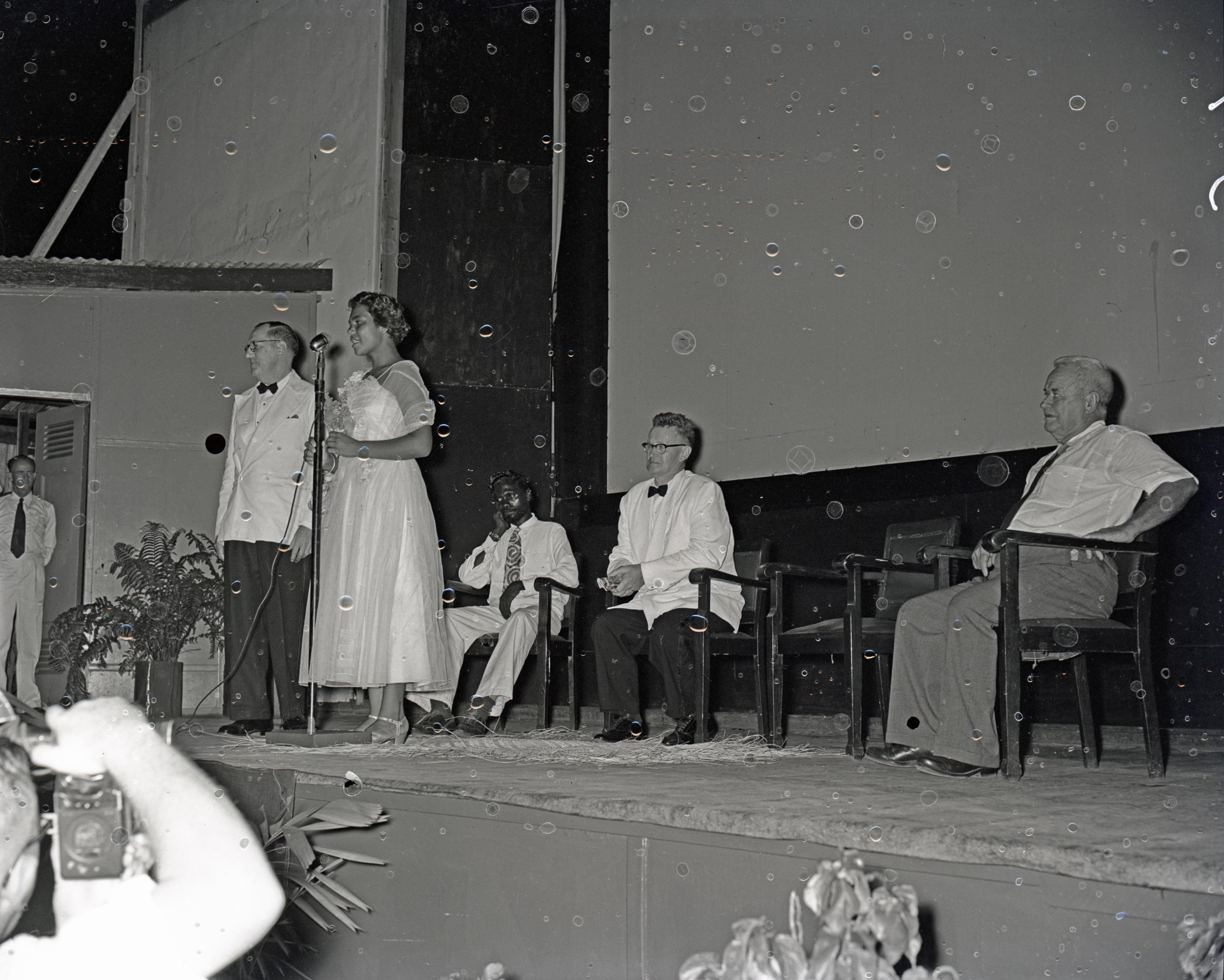
Rosalie Kunoth-Monks, speaking at the Darwin premiere of Jedda at the Star Theatre in Darwin, Northern Territory in 1955.

The film had its world premiere on 3 January 1955 at the Star Theatre in Darwin. The theatre's manager Tom Harris arranged for a member of the Warhiti tribe "to sing songs and burn sticks to prevent any unwanted rainfalls during the screening. He decorated the theatre for the opening with pandanus, grass mats and Aboriginal artefacts. Large crowds gathered along Smith Street to catch a glimpse of the film's stars, Ngarla Kunoth and Robert Tudawali. The two were permitted to sit in the balcony with the Northern Territory Administrator Frank Wise and his wife.

The film then opened in Sydney in May. Its commercial reception was solid rather than sensational: Charles Chauvel Productions Ltd received £17,915 from the film in May and June 1955. The company's name was changed to Jedda Ltd to help exploit the film. In December 1956 Jedda Ltd reported a profit of £50,454 for the year to 30 June, reducing the debit balance in the production account to £69,697. The film had been successful in Australia but performed disappointingly overseas.

The film was released in the UK as Jedda the Uncivilised.

Some time after the film was completed and released in locations around the world, the film in Gevacolor was found to have faded from ageing. In 1972 the film was reproduced from original tri-separations found in London.

This was Charles Chauvel's last feature film. He had intended to adapt Kay Glasson Taylor's novel The Wars of the Outer March, but was hired by the BBC to make the TV series Walkabout. Before he could resume work on his feature projects he died on 11 November 1959.

== Influence ==
The making of the film inspired the 1959 play and later TV play Burst of Summer.

The groundbreaking film was played for audiences at the Cannes Film Festival 60 years later in 2015 with a restored version.

== See also ==
- Cinema of Australia
