= The Moth of Moonbi =

1926 film

- Directed by: Charles Chauvel
- Written by: Charles Chauvel
- Based on: novel The Wild Moth by Mabel Forrest
- Produced by: Charles Chauvel
- Starring: Marsden Hassall; Doris Ashwin; Arthur Tauchert; Charles O'Mara
- Cinematography: Al Burne
- Production company: Australian Film Productions
- Release date: 25 January 1926
- Running time: 9,000 feet
- Country: Australia
- Language: English
- Budget: £4,400

The Moth of Moonbi is a 1926 Australian film directed by Charles Chauvel. It was adapted from The Wild Moth, a 1924 novel by Australian author Mabel Forrest. (Note: In her 1973 memoir My Life with Charles Chauvel (p20), Elsa Chauvel erroneously states that The Moth of Moonbi was an adaptation of a poem by Ethel M. Forest.) It was Queensland's first feature-length film. Only part of the film survives today.

== Plot ==
Dell Ferris is a tomboy from the country town of Moonbi who is loved by English head stockman Tom. She goes to the city where sophisticated Margery Daw helps Dell spend her money in high society. Dell returns to Moonbi poorer but wiser and marries Tom.

== Cast ==
- Marsden Hassall as Tom Resoult
- Doris Ashwin as Dell Ferris
- Arthur Tauchert as Jack Bronson
- Charles O'Mara as Ferris
- Michael Dwyer as Rodger Down
- Colleen Richards as Margery Daw
- Billie Stokes as Josephine
- Jack Reed as Bill Devine
- Darla Townend as Little Dell
- Edward Lyon as Martin Brooks
- Charles Chauvel as aboriginal stockman

== Production ==
After spending eighteen months in Hollywood studying the filmmaking process, Charles Chauvel returned to Queensland and formed his own production company, Australian Film Productions Ltd. He helped to secure funding by lobbying the Ipswich and Toowoomba Chambers of Commerce on the necessity of an Australian film industry. The company was formed by issuing 30,000 shares at £1 each. Chauvel announced his goal in 1924:

It is our intention to produce films in Queensland and wherever possible to use Queensland talent in all departments of our work. Queensland, with its excellent climate conditions, its months of fine weather, and its beautiful and varied scenery is undoubtedly one of the best parts of Australia in which to produce motion pictures... We intend to film our stories with faithful regard to thc spirit and traditions of our young nation, and we will present the same with the belief that there will be audience response for home-made productions which are offered through the joint efforts of Australian writers, craftsmen, and artists.

In the end the paid-up capital of the company was £7,000, and the uncalled capital was £4,240.

On-location filming took place in Queensland, at three primary locations: near Spicers Peak, at Franklyn Vale cattle station, and under the Sleeping Assyrian, a mountain in the Rosevale Valley. The film unit, comprising a total of eighteen members, included a bush chef and a supply of sheep and fowl. The lead roles were played by Doris Ashwin and Marsden Hassell, who later married.

Chauvel was thrown off his horse during filming but escaped injury.

== Reception ==
The film was highly popular in Queensland but it fared less well in the Southern states. Despite this, the movie made a reported profit of £1,300 and Chauvel made another film for the company, Greenhide (1926).

Mabel Forrest was very pleased with the film.

On 7 July 1926, The Moth of Moombi was screened at the RSL Hall in the town of Castle Creek (now called Theodore), which was part of the Dawson Valley Irrigation Scheme. The artists who were filming Greenhide on Walloon Station were among those present. On 21 December 1928, the film was the first film shown at the (now heritage-listed) Majestic Picture Theatre in Malanda, Queensland.
