= Wards of the Outer March =

1932 novel by Kay Glasson Taylor

Wards of the Outer March is a 1932 Australian novel by Kay Glasson Taylor. It was the tale of a convict in colonial New South Wales. The book had been serialised by the Australian Woman's Mirror in 1930 under the pseudonym Daniel Hamline, with illustrations by Percy Lindsay.

== Proposed film version ==
Charles Chauvel bought the film rights.

In the 1950s he and his wife Elsa wrote a film script of the novel for Warwick Pictures. In April 1956 Warwick announced the film would be made as The Broad Arrow as part of a three-year slate of films worth $17 million. The film was scheduled for filming in August 1956 under the title The Broad Arrow. However it was not made. In November 1956 Chauvel said he could not accept the script which Warwick sent him. "I consider that the title The Broad Arrow is an affront and the new script a grave mis-statement of Australian history and sentiment," said Chauvel.
