= Greenhide =

1926 film

- Directed by: Charles Chauvel
- Written by: Charles Chauvel; Frank White (titles)
- Produced by: Charles Chauvel
- Starring: Elsa Chauvel (as Elsie Sylvaney); Bruce Gordon; Frank Thorn; Irma Deardon
- Production company: Australian Film Productions
- Release date: 20 November 1926
- Running time: 8,000 feet
- Country: Australia
- Language: English
- Budget: £3,800
- Box office: £1,000

Greenhide is a 1926 Australian film directed by Charles Chauvel. Only part of the film survives.

== Plot ==
High society girl Margery Paton (Elsa Chauvel) leaves the city to live on her father's cattle property, run by "Greenhide Gavin" (Bruce Gordon). She carries romantic notions of the bush, of "being swung to the saddle by big brown arms", but Greenhide Gavin is initially only annoyed by her presence. Greenhide contains a blossoming romance, and the thwarting of a plot to steal cattle.

== Cast ==
- Elsie Sylvaney as Margery Paton
- Bruce Gordon as Greenhide Gavin
- Jules Murray-Prior as Slab Rawlins
- Irma Dearden as Polly Andrews
- Gerald Barlow as Sam Paton
- Frank Thorn as Tom Mullins
- Joe Mackaway as Phil Mackin
- Alfred Greenup as Bill Mullins
- Nell Kerwin
- George Barrett

== Production ==
Greenhide was Charles Chauvel's second film, following The Moth of Moonbi (1926), and his final silent film. Chauvel scouted his leading lady, then Elsie May Wilcox, after seeing her in a stage musical called Crackers at the Cremorne Theatre in Brisbane, Queensland. Though she was reluctant at first to audition, Chauvel convinced her to perform a screentest, and ultimately offered her the role. They began a romantic relationship over the course of filming, and were married on 5 June 1927, at St James Church, Sydney, the ceremony officiated by Charles' brother, the Reverend John Chauvel.

Frank Thorn, the villain, was a boxer.

Location filming took place at Walloon Station in Dawson Valley, Queensland. It was loaned to the production by EJ Shaw.

The production encampment, a collection of tents accommodating 20 people, was informally named "Camp Greenhide" by locals. The producers were at Walloon Station filming the production in June 1926. Filming took about a month on location.

The unit moved to Brisbane in late July 1926 and interio filming took place in a studio at Oxford House, Ann St, Brisbane. Chauvel played a phonograph recording of "In a Monastery Garden" to induce realistic tears from Elsa Chauvel without the need to use glycerine drops. The tennis court scenes were shot at the Indooroopilly House of Mr and Mrs Ross Monro.

== Release ==
Greenhide was screened throughout most of Queensland without the use of a distribution agency. Charles and Elsa Chauvel personally transported prints of the film from town to town, and tried to convince theatre owners to replace booked American films with a local alternative. Prior to each screening, Elsa would provide a dramatic monologue and introduction.

The film made its debut in Brisbane on 20 November 1926.

In Brisbane and Sydney, Greenhide was screened through the distributor Hoyts and broke records in Brisbane.

However, the movie struggled to find distribution in country areas and the southern cities. In 1927, it was reported the film still had to earn £6,030 to recoup all of its costs, due in part to the large portion of box office earnings taken by distributors and exhibitors.

This caused Australian Film Productions to go into voluntary liquidation in 1929. Later, the liquidator left Brisbane and copies of the film were abandoned in a building and caught fire.

Greenhide, in its original form, was 8,000 feet long, but only 2,475 feet of 35mm film survive (37 minutes at 18 frames per second).
