= Rangle River =

- Film poster
- Directed by: Clarence G. Badger
- Written by: Charles Chauvel; Elsa Chauvel
- Based on: story by Zane Grey
- Starring: Victor Jory; Robert Coote
- Cinematography: Errol Hinds; Damien Parer
- Edited by: Frank Coffey; Mona Donaldson
- Production companies: Columbia Pictures; National Studios
- Distributed by: Columbia Pictures (Australia, UK & US); J.H. Hoffberg (US reissue)
- Release date: 19 December 1936 (Australia)
- Running time: 86 minutes
- Country: Australia
- Language: English
- Budget: £20,000

Rangle River is a 1936 Australian Western film directed by Clarence G. Badger based on a story by Zane Grey.

== Synopsis ==
Marion Hastings returns to her father Dan's cattle property in western Queensland after being away in Europe for fifteen years. She is treated with hostility by her father's foreman, Dick Drake, and her father's neighbour, Don Lawton.

The river on the Hastings' property keeps drying up. An English house guest, Reggie Mannister discovers that the river is being dammed by Donald Lawton. Marion goes to investigate as Lawton dynamites his dam. Marion is trapped in the flood. Drake comes her to aid, rescues Marion from drowning and helps defeat Lawton in a whip duel.

Dick and Marion are reunited and walk off into the sunset, with Marion holding the whip, literally.

== Cast ==
- Victor Jory as Dick Drake
- Margaret Dare as Marion Hastings
- Robert Coote as Reggie Mannister
- Cecil Perry as Donald Lawton
- George Bryant as Dan Hastings
- Leo Cracknell as Barbwire
- Georgie Sterling as Minna
- Rita Pauncefort as Aunt Abbie
- Stewart McColl as Black

== Production ==
=== Development ===
The movie was partly financed by a Hollywood studio, Columbia, and used an imported American star, director and principal technicians. It was made by National Studios, who owned Pagewood Film Studios and had links with National Productions, the company that made The Flying Doctor (1936). According to Filmink "There was a trend at the time to import third-tier Hollywood names to appear in Australian films; this would generate considerable publicity at home and possibly help overseas sales."

=== Story ===
The original story was written by popular writer Zane Grey while at Bermagui during his 1935 fishing tour of Australia, a period which also produced the film White Death (1936). Grey's original story reportedly only went for two pages. The script was adapted by Charles and Elsa Chauvel and other uncredited writers. It features a number of stock characters from Australian films and theatre of the time, such as the "squatter's daughter" and the "English new chum". It has been suggested the 1933 film version of The Squatter's Daughter was particularly influential.

Grey later wrote up his story as a short story which was not published in a collection until 1976. A biographer of the author wrote, "Intended as a kind of postcard of Australia, the story is flimsy, the characters tissuey, and the setting unconvincing. Moreover, the storyline reads like a synopsis. Some scenes are feebly sketched and the dialogue often is wooden and contrived."

=== Castings ===
The role of Marion Hastings was originally offered to Nancy O'Neil, an Australian actor living in England. The director, Clarence G. Badger was imported from Hollywood, as was star Victor Jory. The female lead was finally given to a Sydney girl, Peggy Barnes, who changed her name to Margaret Dare. She was signed to a three-year contract with National Studios but asked to be released from it.

Although there was some suggestion the film would be made in Queensland it was eventually shot on location near Gloucester and in the Burragorang Valley.

While in Australia, Jory's activities were widely reported. He attended social functions, appeared on radio and went shooting in the Northern Territory. His wife, actress Jean Inness, appeared under her own name in a performance of The Royal Family of Broadway at the Theatre Royal in October 1936. Jory was fined for speeding while driving in Sydney.

== Reception ==
Andrew Pike and Ross Cooper report that after an opening at Sydney's Plaza Theatre in December 1936, the film enjoyed a successful run in Australia. The critic from The Sydney Morning Herald described it as "the best film that has been produced in Australia so far". Variety wrote "it moves along at a fast rate, carries plenty of action and is ideal popular fare for a dual bill."

Filmink argued the movie "does contain a lot of campy stuff, even for a Western, perhaps the most homoerotic of genres – Robert Coote and Victor Jory seem to flirt in their scenes together, Jory and Dare have enjoyable banter but he’s reluctant to kiss her even though her character is up for it, Jory and Cecil Parry [Perry] have a whip duel at the end that is downright kinky and became legendary." However the same reviewer added the movie was "an entirely decent, unpretentious, watchable Australian film that offered a practical way of telling Australian stories that might appeal internationally."

=== Overseas release ===
The film was released in the UK after some cuts were made by the censor to the whip fighting scene and was issued in the US under the title Men with Whips by the J.H. Hoffberg Company Inc.

=== Proposed sequel ===
National Studios were keen to produce a sequel. A shooting script was written, Clarence Badger agreed to return and by December 1936 an agreement had almost been formed with Columbia Pictures. Then the government announced that the New South Wales Film Quota Act would be not be enforced and Columbia withdrew. Said Frederick Davies of National Studios:

We would go on and produce the picture ourselves, if we could. But, to be quite frank our company cannot obtain enough money from the investors. From the moment when The Burgomeister was rejected by the advisory board, with the consequence that it had to be shelved at a total loss, the public shied away from the business side of Australian motion pictures.

Robert Coote went to Hollywood after filming and enjoyed a long career there. In January 1937 Margaret Dare left for Los Angeles but she made no further films.

Clarence Badger settled in Australia but only made one more feature, That Certain Something (1941). Many elements of the script for this film were possibly influenced by Badger's experience making Rangle River.
