= Russia Aflame =

- Directed by: Charles Chauvel
- Produced by: Charles Chauvel
- Production company: Columbia
- Release date: 1943
- Running time: 12 minutes
- Country: Australia
- Language: English

Russia Aflame is a 1943 short Australian documentary directed by Charles Chauvel.

== Plot ==
The film opens before the Nazi attack on the Soviet Union in June 1941, and shows peasants at work in fields along the Volga, shepherds looking after their sheep on the steppes, and crop cultivation in Ukraine. It then deals with the consequences of the invasion, including the role of women in the war effort and Russian factory production.

== Production ==
The film was made from a number of shorts imported to Australia from the local chapter of Friends of the Soviet Union. Columbia's Sydney office hired Charles Chauvel to reconstruct and dramatise the story into a new film.

== Release ==
The critic from The Sydney Morning Herald stated that:

Though there are some inevitable weaknesses in continuity, the result achieves the main purpose of illuminating with quiet, sympathetic, and well delivered commentary the spirit of Russia in travail, and the Russian nation's bravery and grim resourcefulness. Frequently the audience on Friday night broke into fervent applause as Stalin or his marshals (Timoshenko, Budenny, Voroshilov) appeared briefly on the screen. The awakening of the nation into the dread reality of war has been well dramatised, as has the Soviet's call upon its oil resources and its men and women. The scenes of Russia's scorched-earth policy in operation show the ruthlessness of this last defensive action, and add to the pathos of a film that pays tribute to a most heroic nation.

Chauvel would sometimes accompany screenings of the movie.
