= Ngalla Maya =

Ngalla Maya was a Western Australian non-profit organisation benefiting Aboriginal Australians and Torres Strait Islanders newly released from prison. The organisation mentored and trained newly released prisoners and helped them find employment. The ex-prisoner population of Aboriginal and Torres Strait Islander peoples is at high risk of committing suicide. As of May 2016 the organisation received no funding from the Government of Australia, but was wholly community supported.

The founder and CEO of Ngalla Maya was Mervyn Eades, recognised in consecutive years at the National Indigenous Human Rights Awards, for his transformative work in prison to community and employment - recipient of the 2016 Eddie Mabo Social Justice Award and the 2017 Dr Yunupingu Human Rights Award.

Prominent suicide prevention researcher and prison to work reformer, Gerry Georgatos was a supporter of Ngalla Maya, writing in national media, "There are only a few organisations and programs authentically transforming the lives of inmates and former inmates. One of the most successful programs is Ngalla Maya, a prison to wellbeing, to training and education, to employment effort founded by a former inmate, Noongar man Mervyn Eades."

Georgatos also stated in 2017, "In the past year, Ngalla Maya inspired more than 140 inmates to participate in training and educational programs. They are now employed. No other program has achieved these results. Despite receiving support from the Federal Government, the Western Australian government has not given it a single penny."

Georgatos identified, "In Western Australia, more than 90 per cent of inmates have not completed a Year 12 education; more than 60 per cent have not completed Year 10; and more than 40 per cent have not completed Year 9. One in six of the state’s Aboriginal people have been to prison."

"In Western Australia, the rate of imprisonment of Aboriginal and/or Torres Strait Islander children is 50 per cent higher than the imprisonment rate of black children in the US. Australia incarcerates Aboriginal juveniles at 37 per 10,000, whereas the United States is at 52 per 10,000, according to the US Justice Department. However, Western Australia incarcerates Aboriginal children at 78 per 10,000."

Ngalla Maya's record breaking success led the Commonwealth as of May 2019 to further fund Ngalla Maya to transform the lives of a further 220 ex-justice (recently released prisoners) candidates.

'Ngalla Maya' is a Noongar phrase meaning 'our place'.

== Liquidation ==
On 21 June 2022, the Office of the Registrar of Indigenous Corporations (ORIC) issued a notice appointing authorised officers to examine the books of the Ngalla Maya Aboriginal Corporation under section 453-1 of the Corporations (Aboriginal and Torres Strait Islander) Act 2006 (CATSI Act).

On 5 December 2022, ORIC issued a notice requiring the directors of Ngalla Maya to seek independent proper and competent accounting and/or legal advice in relation to the corporation’s financial position and financial viability.

On 31 January 2023, ORIC received notification the corporation was under liquidation.
