= Gold Coast Film Festival =

Australian film festival

Coordinates: 28°04′35″S 153°23′07″E

- Location: Home of the Arts, Surfers Paradise, Queensland, Australia
- Founded: 2002
- Awards: Chauvel Award and others
- Directors: Josh Martin (CEO)
- Festival date: 19–30 April 2023
- Website: gcff.com.au

The Gold Coast Film Festival (GCFF), formerly Gold Coast Film Fantastic, is an annual Australian film festival, as of 2022 held at the Home of the Arts (HOTA) in Surfers Paradise, Gold Coast, Queensland. Founded in 2002 as a fantasy film festival, GCFF now delivers a program of feature films, short films (SIPFEST), web series, film awards, and special events.

== History ==
Modelled on the Brussels International Festival of Fantasy Film, the festival began with a focus on fantasy and Science fiction films. The first festival took place in August 2002, under the direction of Casey Marshall Siemer, with Oscar-winning visual effects specialist John Cox as patron. The early festivals were known as Gold Coast Film Fantastic, and ran for four days in Robina. The inaugural event screened 21 films and included a Peter Jackson retrospective. The third festival, which ran for a few days only, from 5 to 8 August 2004, took place at Robina.

Sometime between late 2009 and January 2011, the festival expanded its focus and changed its name to Gold Coast Film Festival. The 2011 event was staged at Birch Carroll and Coyle Cinemas, Southport.

In 2013 the Gold Coast Film Festival supported Australia's first online video maker award ceremony, the Australian Webstream Awards, and is supported by ABC Gold Coast. Past director Mitch Ziems helped open the ceremony that took place at the Metro Arts Theatre in Brisbane, Queensland on 16 November 2013.

In 2014, under director Kylie Pascoe, the festival broadened its focus in terms of genre, and also started showing more international films. At that time the Gold Coast Film festival had a cultural partnership with Supanova Pop Culture Expo and QPOW! as a part of the Gold Coast's pop culture heritage.

The festival became known for its support of gender equality in the Australian screen industry in 2016, and in 2018 was the venue for the launch of Women in Film and Television (WIFT) Australia.

The 15th annual Gold Coast Film Festival ran from Wednesday 19 April – Sunday 30 April 2017 at venues across the Gold Coast. For the first time in its 15-year history, the Gold Coast Film Festival 2017 accepted submissions for feature films to screen at the event. In this year, with the support of Screen Queensland, GCFF became one of seven festivals to become a feature film qualifier for AACTA Awards.

Lucy Fisher was CEO and director of the festival from 2015 until the end of 2020.

In 2021, Aimée Lindorff was director. In this year, Gold Coast Film Festival delivered the first hybrid iteration of the Festival.

== Description ==
The festival delivers a program of diverse Australian and international feature films, special events, seminars and workshops, special guests and art. Its purpose is to promote the dynamic and creative culture community and to encourage the next generation of homegrown filmmakers. It celebrates and promotes all aspects of film and filmmaking, and offers a culturally diverse program of films, including local independent films and national and international special guests within the film industry.

The event also hosts a series of free filmmaking workshops and seminars, as well as the GCFF Future Filmmakers seminar held at Bond University for year 11 and 12 high school students who are interested in the film industry to learn from industry leaders.

The 2023 event runs from 19 to 30 April 2023.

=== SIPFEST ===
The Shorts in Paradise Festival, known as SIPFEST, is a free event showcasing short films from across Australia. Seven awards are on offer for these films.

== Governance and funding ==
As of 2022, Josh Martin is CEO, with Sue-Anne Chapman chair of the board. Margot Robbie is patron of the festival, while the three ambassadors are Lincoln Lewis, Sue Maslin and Jenny Cooney.

The festival is supported by Screen Queensland, Queensland Government, the tourism and events Queensland program, HOTA, and the City of Gold Coast. Other partners include Bond University, Warner Bros. Movie World, Village Roadshow Studios, and a number of other corporate sponsors.

== Awards ==
=== Chauvel Award ===
The Chauvel Award, formerly awarded at the Brisbane International Film Festival (BIFF), was established in 1992 and named in honour of filmmaking couple Charles and Elsa Chauvel. Past recipients of the Chauvel Award include producer Anthony Buckley, directors Paul Cox and Rolf de Heer, actors Bryan Brown and Geoffrey Rush, cinematographer John Seale, documentary makers Bob Connolly and Robin Anderson, and film critic David Stratton. One of the last few awards at BIFF were awarded posthumously to Heath Ledger in 2008, and Alex Barnes & Dean Gibson in 2010 before being revived by GCFF in 2016. Since then, the winners include:

- 2016: Claudia Karvan
- 2017: Deborah Mailman
- 2018: Sue Milliken
- 2019: Sigrid Thornton
- 2021: Sue Maslin AO
- 2022: Leah Purcell AO
- 2023: Baz Luhrmann & Catherine Martin

=== Others ===
A number of other awards are given at the Gold Coast Film Festival. As of 2022 these are:

- Best Australian Independent Film Award (A$5,000)
- PKF Best Australian Film Award
- Queensland Screenwriting Award
- SIPFEST (Shorts in Paradise) – 7 categories
- Best Australian Webseries
- Best International Webseries
- EMERGE! Student Short Films
- Queensland Screen Business of the Year
- Gold Coast Screen Professional of the Year

== See also ==
- List of festivals in Australia
