= A Mountain Goes to Sea =

- Directed by: Charles Chauvel
- Produced by: Commonwealth Film Laboratories
- Cinematography: George Heath
- Production company: Commonwealth Office of Information
- Release date: 1943
- Running time: 6 mins
- Country: Australia
- Language: English

A Mountain Goes to Sea, also known as Shipbuilders, is a 1943 short Australian documentary directed by Charles Chauvel about the Australian shipbuilders during World War II.
