= Burst of Summer =

1961 film by William T. Sterling

- Original language: English
- Written by: Oriel Gray
- Subject: Race relations

Premiere
- Date: 2 Feb 1960
- Place: Little Theatre, South Yarra, Melbourne

Burst of Summer is a 1959 play by Oriel Gray. It won the 1959 J. C. Williamson's Little Theatre Guild Award, and was later adapted for radio and TV. It was Gray's last produced play.

== Plot ==
In 1955, racial tensions erupt in a small town after a young Aboriginal girl, Peggy, gains brief notability as a film actress. White townsfolk decide to build houses and move the Aboriginal residents of "The Flats" into them.

== Background ==
Burst of Summer was written by Gray in 1959. The story is based on the story of Ngarla Kunoth, who was cast in the lead of Charles Chauvel's film Jedda and was inspired by Gray's experiences living in Lismore in the 1940s. It won £500 in the Little Theatre Competition. The prize included a try out at the Melbourne Little Theatre.

== Original production ==
The play was first produced in 1960 at the Little Theatre in Melbourne. The cast included Morris Brown, Max Bruch and Marcella Burgoyne.

The Bulletin said the production "received the usual treatment accorded Australian art. No mention from TV, or commercial radio, a review from the A.8.C., and the usual back-page notice in the dailies."

In a review, the theatre critic from The Bulletin lamented that Grey "chose such stereotyped characters and situations as vehicles for her often stimulating thoughts on the problem of racial intolerance", but praised the play's "absence of dull moments, its perky good humor and wit and the author's efficient handling of dialogue."

The play was submitted for production by the Melbourne Theatre Company but they rejected it.

== 1960 radio adaptation ==
The play was performed on ABC Radio National in Sydney in 1960.

== 1961 TV adaptation ==
See Burst of Summer (television play)

== Awards ==
- 1959 J. C. Williamson's Little Theatre Guild Award.

== Notes ==
- Moss, Merrilee (2017). Australian women playwrights: the sacrifice of Oriel Gray (thesis). Monash University. doi:10.4225/03/58b613646486d.
