= Soldiers Without Uniform =

- Directed by: Charles Chauvel
- Produced by: Charles Chauvel
- Cinematography: George Heath
- Release date: January 1942
- Running time: 10 minutes
- Country: Australia
- Language: English

Soldiers Without Uniform is a 1942 short Australian programme about Australian industry during World War II directed by Charles Chauvel.
