= George Farwell =

Australian novelist (1911–1976)

George Michell Farwell (3 October 1911 – 6 August 1976) was an English-born Australian novelist, freelance journalist, broadcaster and travel writer.

== Early career ==
Farwell was born in Bath, Somerset, England. and was educated at a number of different schools, ending with Forest School, Walthamstow, which he left at age 17. He lost both his parents at about the same time, and after struggling to make a living in Depression-era London, he left for an eighteen-month expedition to French Polynesia. This led to a life of fairly constant travel. Arriving in Sydney in 1935, he worked in or near that city at various jobs such as deckhand, dock labourer and gold miner, and contributed articles to the Sydney Mail at the same time.

== Writing career ==
Although Farwell experienced a number of lean years in Sydney, he kept on writing about the various experiences he had on the job, as well as on his travels to various parts of the world. His first book, Down Argent Street, telling the story of Broken Hill, New South Wales, was published in 1948. He published twenty two books in all, including an autobiography and biographies of Charles Sturt and E. D. S. Ogilvie. His articles and short stories have appeared in numerous publications, including The Bulletin and Walkabout. He contbuted also to the radio programme Australian Walkabout.

== Bibliography ==
=== Books ===
- Farwell, George (1948). Down Argent Street: The Story of Broken Hill. F. H. Johnston Publishing Co., Sydney.
- — (1949). Traveller's Tracks. Melbourne University Press, Melbourne.
- — (1950). Land of Mirage - The Story of Men, Cattle and Camels on the Birdsville Track. Cassell & Company Ltd., London.
- — (1950). Surf Music and Other Stories. Australasian Publishing Company, Sydney.
- — (1951). The Outside Track. Melbourne University Press, Melbourne.
- — (1952). Australian Setting. Evans Brothers, London.
- — (1961). Vanishing Australians. Rigby Limited, Adelaide.
- — (1962). Cape York to the Kimberleys. Rigby Limited, Adelaide.
- — (1963). Riders to an Unknown Sea. Macmillan, Melbourne.
- — (1964). Last Days in Paradise. Rigby Limited, Adelaide.
- — (1965). Ghost Towns of Australia. Rigby Limited, Adelaide.
- — (1966). Mask Of Asia: The Philippines. F.W. Cheshire, Melbourne.
- — (1967). Australian Landscapes. Thomas Nelson & Sons, Melbourne.
- — (1968). Seven Thousand Isles: Discovering the Philippines. Landsdowne Press, Melbourne.
- — (1970). Around Australia on Highway One. Thomas Nelson & Sons, Melbourne.
- — (1970). The House That Jack Built, a Play. Heinemann Educational, Melbourne.
- — (1970). Ned Kelly. F.W. Cheshire, Melbourne.
- — (1970). Sun Country. Thomas Nelson & Sons, Melbourne.
- — (1971). Requiem for Woolloomooloo. Hodder & Stoughton, Sydney.
- — (1973). Squatter's Castle: the Story of a Pastoral Dynasty. Landsdowne Press, Melbourne.
- — (1976). Rejoice in Freedom. Thomas Nelson & Sons, Melbourne.
- — (1977). Farwell Country. Thomas Nelson & Sons, Melbourne.

=== Articles ===
- George Farwell, "First novel set in Australia", The Sydney Morning Herald, 30 July 1966 - review of: Adventures on a Journey to New Holland and The Lonely Deathbed, by Therese Huber. Translated from the German original Abentheuer auf einer Reise nach Neu-Holland (1793) by Rodney Livingstone. Edited, with preface and notes, by Leslie Bodi. Melbourne: Lansdowne Press, 1966.

=== Radio Plays ===
- What Happened to Leichhardt?

== Critical studies and reviews ==
- Masselos, James (December 1967). "[Review of Mask of Asia]". Journal of the Royal Australian Historical Society. 53 (4): 368–371.

== Last days ==
George Farwell died at his home in Kingswood, a suburb of Adelaide, in 1976. He was survived by his second wife and two children from his first marriage. His ashes were scattered on the Birdsville Track.

== See also ==
- Australian outback literature of the 20th century
