= Power to Win (film) =

- Directed by: Charles Chauvel
- Produced by: Charles Chauvel
- Release date: 1942
- Running time: 12 minutes
- Country: Australia
- Language: English

Power to Win is a 1942 short Australian documentary directed by Charles Chauvel about the Australian coal industry during World War II.
