= Kay Glasson Taylor =

Australian novelist

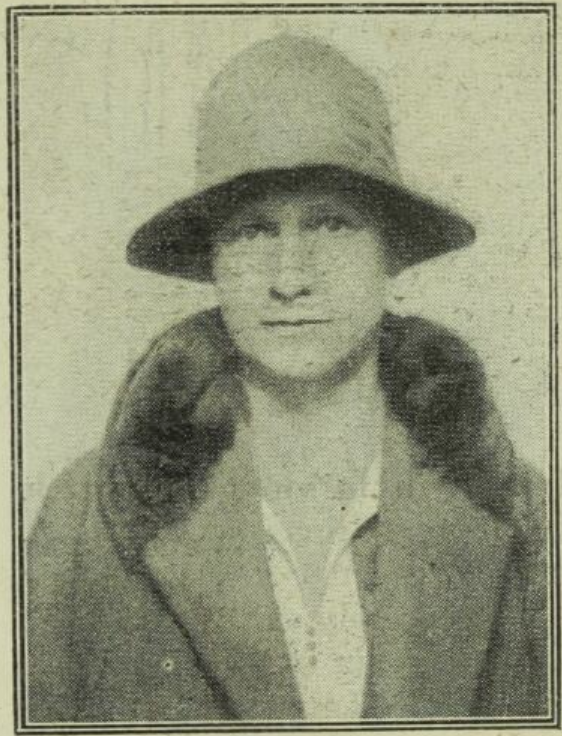
Kay Glasson Taylor in 1930

Kay Glasson Taylor (8 July 1893 – 14 May 1998) was an Australian novelist.

== Early life ==
Katherine "Kay" Glasson was born in Queensland. All of her grandparents were Cornish Australians; three of them were born in Bathurst, New South Wales. Her younger sister Deirdre Tregarthen was a poet. Kay Glasson attended medical school in Sydney.

== Career ==
Novels by Kay Glasson Taylor include Ginger for Pluck (published under the pseudonym "Daniel Hamline", for young readers, 1929); Pick and the Duffers (1930), called "an Australian Tom Sawyer" by more than one reviewer; Wards of the Outer March (1932), set in "convict days in New South Wales", with a disabled Cornish central character; and Bim (for young readers; serialized in 1946, published as a book in 1947). Her fiction is still read as a representation of white Australian women's experiences of gender and race in the context of colonialism.

Pick and the Duffers was adapted for an Australian film soon after publication. It was awarded the second prize of £250 in The Bulletin's novel competition in 1930, beaten by Vance Palmer's The Passage.

== Personal life ==
Kay Glasson married Ronald Beresford Taylor in 1916. They had three children (Dorothy, Ian, and Desmond) and lived at Murilla South, Surat, Queensland, on a ranch where they bred Shetland ponies.

Kay Glasson Taylor was widowed in 1957, and died in 1998, aged 104 years. Her grave is in Brisbane General (Toowong) Cemetery.
