= Frank Legg =

Australian journalist

- Born: Frank Hooper Legg; 26 June 1906; Walmer, England
- Died: 30 March 1966 (aged 59); Hornsby, Sydney, Australia
- Education: Sir Roger Manwood's School
- Occupation: War correspondent radio journalist television journalist
- Organization: Australian Broadcasting Corporation
- Spouse: Evelyn Amy Bragg
- Children: Richard Legg

Frank Hooper Legg (26 June 1906 – 30 March 1966) was an Australian war correspondent and journalist. He served as a sergeant in the Australian Imperial Force at Tobruk. He wrote articles for the Australian Broadcasting Corporation (ABC) during his service and was involved in radio and television journalism upon his return to Australia.

== Biography ==
Frank Legg was born in Walmer, Kent in England on 26 June 1906. Educated at Sir Roger Manwood's School in Sandwich, from which he graduated in 1924 after receiving the London General Schools’ honours certificate in 1922. Employed at the Bank of England before his immigration to Brisbane, Australia on 28 June 1927. He married Evelyn Amy Bragg at St Kilda, Melbourne in 1929 however they were divorced a number of years afterwards and he was estranged from their son, Richard. He was hired for Adelaide News and given the nickname "The Prattler" for his position at ABC radio.

=== Military service ===
He enlisted into the Australian Imperial Force, in which he served as a Sergeant and eventually a Sergeant Major. He was active at Tobruk, Libya and Tel El Eisa, Egypt where he would write about the experiences of the soldiers of the ABC. His articles, ‘Tales of Tobruk’ were published in the magazine ABC Weekly. In his broadcast ‘The Worst Day’, he gave an account of his experiences from the battle of El Alamein on 31 October 1942. He admitted an expectation that he would die during the battle and in this and future broadcasts, he would express his admiration for the fighting soldier. He would gain the rank of Lieutenant in 1943 before being asked to be the ABC's war correspondent in the Pacific. He documented the experiences of Australian soldiers in New Guinea, Manila and Tokyo. While in the Pacific, Legg reportedly undertook a journalistic operation that had not been done before. He attempted to make an entire recording of an amphibious operation, however due to technical failures this recording was not able to be broadcast. He also recorded an eyewitness broadcast of the signing of the Japanese surrender, that was also unable to be broadcast due to shortwave circuitry failure. Despite this, he delivered many broadcasts and reports to the ABC during his time as a journalist in the Pacific. During his time there he also recorded material for a documentary on the invasion of Tarakan. He returned home after the Japanese surrender on 2 September 1945.

=== Post War career ===
Upon his return to Sydney after the conclusion of World War II, Legg attained a position at the Australian Broadcasting Corporation as a television and radio chairman and compere. In radio, he became known for his shows Week-End Magazine (1946–59), Film Review (1949–66) and Any Questions (1955–64). Legg participated in the first Australian television broadcast on 5 November 1956. He appeared on the broadcast holding a kitten, which he had a fondness for, and he interviewed Mrs Chica Lowe, the manager of a Sydney boarding house called the Merioola house. Outside of his work for radio and television at the Australian Broadcasting Corporation, Legg also worked on documentaries and books that focused on the topic of wartime experiences. Most of these works were biographical, however he did write and publish an autobiography entitled War Correspondent.

=== Death ===
Frank Legg died on 30 March 1966 at the Hornsby Hospital in Sydney's North Shore. His death was caused by injuries he suffered as a result of a traffic collision at Turramurra. The Director of Talks at the ABC, Alan Carmichael, wrote a eulogy for Legg in the Radio Active journal to recognise his contribution to journalism, making the claim that "No correspondent in the Pacific saw more action with the Australians than he". He was posthumously awarded the Journalist's Club award in 1965 for his work on Frank Hurley's biography, titles Once More on My Adventure, which he worked on with Hurley's daughter Toni Hurley.

== Published works ==
Legg wrote a number of books that were published outside of his work at the ABC. With the exception of Cat's On Velvet, they were all about experiences of World War II, both his own and others’.

The Eyes of Damien Parer, Rigby, 1963 (With photographic contributions from Damien Parer)

- A biography and collection of the work of the Australian military photographer Damien Parer. It includes 79 of his photographs from his career documenting Australia's involvement in World War II.

War Correspondent, Rigby, 1964

- Legg's autobiography recounting his involvement in the South-West Pacific region during the Second World War. The work also details the experiences and attitudes of the Australian forces in the region.

The Gordon Bennet Story, Angus & Robertson, 1965

- A biography of the Australian Lieutenant General Gordan Bennet. It covers his involvement in both the first World War, including Gallipoli, and in the second World War, with a focus on his actions at the Fall of Singapore in February 1942.

Cat's on Velvet, Angus & Robertson, 1966 (Illustrated by Julie Mattox)

- An account of Frank Legg's experience as a cat owner. It is in part a continuation of his earlier autobiography, though the greater focus of the subject matter is on his cats.

Once More on My Adventure: The Life of Frank Hurley, Ure Smith, 1966 (In Association with Antoinette Hurley)

- A biography of the Australian photographer Frank Hurley. Frank Legg wrote the book in association with Frank Hurley's daughter Antoinette Hurley. Hurley was a colleague of both Legg and Damien Parer, a subject of a previous biography written by Legg.

== See also ==
- War correspondent
- We Were Anzacs (1960) - documentary
