= Tauto Sansbury =

Australian Indigenous rights advocate

Tauto Sansbury (c. 1949 – 23 September 2019) was a Narungga man from the Yorke Peninsula of South Australia. He was the recipient of the NAIDOC Lifetime Achievement Award at the 2015 NAIDOC Week celebrations. Sansbury was born and raised on an Aboriginal reserve and dedicated his life to advocacy for Indigenous Australians.

== Early life ==
Sansbury was born at the Point Pearce Mission in the Yorke Peninsula, South Australia. He also had Kaurna and Wirangu heritage.

== Career ==
As state chairperson of the South Australian Aboriginal Justice Advocacy Committee and chairperson of the National Aboriginal Justice Advisory Committee for over 10 years, Sansbury fought to improve the conditions of Aboriginal people in the criminal justice system.

Sansbury served in numerous official and voluntary positions, including chairperson of the South Australian Aboriginal Coalition for Social justice.

He was a consultant to the Social Inclusion Unit, undertaking community consultations on the so-called "Gang of 49" for the Breaking the Cycle Report. More recently he was employed as CEO and general manager in health and Aboriginal employment and ran his own Aboriginal consultancy called Garridja.

In 2014, Sansbury launched a national advocacy movement for Indigenous people, the Freedom Movement.

Sansbury was a long term member of the Australian Labor Party and stood for elections, but in 2013 resigned from the party stating that whether in opposition or government it does not help Aboriginal people.

Sansbury died on 23 September 2019 after a 15-month illness with non-Hodgkin's lymphoma.

== Awards ==
- 1996: Aboriginal of the Year, National NAIDOC Awards
- 2003: Australian Centenary medal in recognition of work as Director of the Aboriginal Justice Advocacy Committee and the National Aboriginal Justice Advisory Committee.
- 2014: Male Elder of the Year SA NAIDOC Awards
- 2015: NAIDOC Week National NAIDOC Awards Lifetime Achievement Award
- 2015 National Indigenous Human Rights Awards Dr Yunupingu Award for Human Rights
