= Chris Sarra =

Australian educator

Chris Sarra is an Australian educationalist, the founder and Chairman of the Stronger Smarter Institute. Sarra grew up in Bundaberg, Queensland as the youngest of ten children to parents of Italian and Aboriginal heritage, and he experienced many of the issues faced by Indigenous students throughout their schooling, such as racism and general discrimination.

In 1998, Sarra became the first Aboriginal Principal of Cherbourg State School in South East Queensland where his leadership improved the educational outcomes of its students.

In 2005, Sarra left as principal of Cherbourg School and in 2006, with the support of the Queensland government, he established the Indigenous Education Leadership Institute, the forerunner to the Stronger Smarter Institute.

From 2008 to 2013, the Stronger Smarter Institute was part of the Queensland University of Technology (QUT) before Sarra's termination from his position in March 2013. His termination came after "statements made by Sarra last year that he was planning to leave QUT and education" and after being on leave from the Institute since July the previous year.

Sarra has a Diploma of Teaching, a Bachelor Degree in Education and a Master of Education. In 2005, he completed his PhD in Psychology at Murdoch University. His PhD thesis Strong and Smart – Towards a Pedagogy for Emancipation: Education for First Peoples was developed into a book and published in 2011.

His autobiography was published in 2012 by University of Queensland Press. In 2004, Sarra was Queenslander of the Year, and in 2010 he was Queensland's Australian of the Year. Sarra sits on the Australian Rugby League Commission.

== Cherbourg State School ==
In the late 1990s, Sarra became the first Aboriginal principal of Cherbourg State School in South-East Queensland. Under Sarra's leadership the school became nationally acclaimed for its pursuit of the ‘Strong and Smart' philosophy, which led to dramatic improvements in educational outcomes. Through strong leadership and clear vision he facilitated many changes at the school which saw increasing enthusiasm for student learning, dramatically improved school attendance and increased community involvement in education.

An Education Queensland Review of Cherbourg in 2002 showed considerable improvements in attendance (50% in 1997 to 95% in 2002), as well as improvements in literacy in numeracy. Sarra reversed high absenteeism and low academic achievement in a short period using a range of leadership approaches. He introduced a school uniform, school motto ('strong and smart') and school song. Students were assigned to keep different areas of the school tidy and litter-free, and students monitored their own absences in class and had to explain those absences to the school assembly each week. The school made an Indigenous studies program integral to the curriculum in all years. Steps also included engaging with the community to help build a vision for the school, and engaging local indigenous people to work at the school. Classes and students with the lowest number of absences were rewarded, with encouragements such as free ice blocks from the tuck shop, or trips to McDonald's, or occasionally trips to Melbourne.

Sarra's own report on his time at Cherbourg showed improvements were found in staff, student and community feelings of satisfaction with the school as well as a considerable decrease in the number of students identified as requiring additional support in reading and writing. Performance in Literacy and Numeracy overall showed slight improvement. Enrolments in the school increased from 144 in 1998 to 265 in 2002 as parents became more satisfied with the educational standards at the school. In reflecting on the positive changes in the school, Sarra said, "the most important things I did was believe in the people already at Cherbourg, as well as the new teaching team that was established, and be prepared to value and act upon what they had to say.".

In 2008, Tom Calma, the then Aboriginal and Torres Strait Islander Social Justice Commissioner and National Race Discrimination Commissioner, said in a speech delivered to the Victorian Association of State Secondary Principals in Melbourne,

"the Cherbourg experience shows that a strengths-based approach, rather than a punitive-based approach, can have an enormous beneficial impact. If you ask me about what it means to be inspiring and inspired - the Cherbourg model stands out. And it stands out because it combines Aboriginality with success. The success does not require transplantation to another cultural environment."

In 2004 Education Queensland investigated several complaints against Sarra and upheld four complaints made by students where he was "found to have grabbed, held and shouted" at boys under his care. Sarra explained that he chose to confront bad behaviour rather than suspending children where they would miss school for six weeks." Ken Smith of Education Queensland stated, "Chris has recognised that in those instances he may have overstepped the mark”, and, has given a commitment that he won't do that in future."

When Sarra left as principal in 2005, the principal who replaced him did not share his vision, and Sarra spent a frustrating seven years on the sidelines, watching the school gradually slide with falling attendance and student results. However, in 2011 he was welcomed back to the school by the new principal who had re-adopted the Stronger Smarter Philosophy and was seeing the school starting to pick up again.

== Stronger Smarter Philosophy ==
Sarra explains the Stronger Smarter Philosophy as follows:

It is a fundamental human right of our children to have an education that makes them stronger, in a way that enables them to develop a rich and positive sense of their own cultural identity; and smarter, in a way that enables them to participate in a modern society as any other Australian would. If schools only seek to make Indigenous children smart, without developing any positive sense of cultural identity, then we do little more than assimilate them into the mainstream. In this circumstance we all lose.

== Views on "white" teachers working in Aboriginal communities ==
In 2008, Sarra blamed poor outcomes for Aboriginal students on "white trash" school teachers. He said:

If I'm an incompetent teacher filling the school day with photocopied worksheets, videos and Nintendo, it doesn't matter. Aborigines will get the blame. In its crudest form, remote communities are the place to tuck our white trash away.

== Stronger Smarter Institute ==
Sarra is chairman and founder of the Stronger Smarter Institute, which works with schools to build a positive cultural identity for and among Aboriginal children and to set high expectations of behaviour and academic achievement. The Institute is an independent, not-for-profit organisation which operates nationwide to ensure Indigenous student aim for - and achieve - a brighter future

Sarra assumed the role as chairman and appointed former Deloitte's Consulting Partner Lisa Siganto as Chief Executive Officer in 2014. On 6 November 2014, Indigenous senior executive, Darren Godwell was appointed as the Institute's new CEO, taking over from Lisa Siganto who moved to the Board. Independent directors have been appointed to the board including Herb Elliott AC MBE (former Deputy chairman, Fortescue Metals Group and Olympic gold medal winner), Paul Bridge (educator based in the Kimberley region of Western Australia), Gary Lennon (Executive General Manager Finance at National Australia Bank) and Tanya Orman (NITV Channel Manager). By mid-2015 the Institute reported that it had supported over 2,000 graduates in over 530 schools through the Stronger Smarter Leadership Program, potentially influencing the classrooms of over 38,000 Indigenous students.

=== Funding ===
Funding provided while the Institute was based at the Queensland University of Technology (QUT)

- The Myer Foundation provided support of $400,000 in financial year 2006/07, $460,000 in financial year 2007/08, and $400,000 in financial year 2008/09.
- In September 2009 then Education Minister Julia Gillard announced $16.4 million of government funding for the Stronger Smarter Learning Communities project.
- In July 2010 the Telstra Foundation provided funding of $1.2 million, bringing the total to $2.4 million received from the Telstra Foundation.
- In September 2011 the Gillard Labor government provided a further commitment totalling $30 million through the Focus Schools Next Steps Initiative.
- The Myer Foundation provided additional support of $400,000 in financial year 2010/11. No support was provided in financial year 2011/12. Support of $50,000 was provided in financial year 2012/13. No support was provided in financial year 2013/14.

The Stronger Smarter Learning Communities project and the Focus Schools Next Steps Initiative remained with QUT when the Institute became an independent organization.

Funding provided to Stronger Smarter Institute

- In July 2013 $497,000 was donated to the Stronger Smarter Institute by coal-seam gas company QGC.

=== Learning Communities project assessment ===
A major assessment of the Learning Communities program was led by Allan Luke and published in 2013. The report described the operations and analysed the effects of the Stronger Smarter Learning Communities, addressed major issues facing Indigenous education by collecting and analysing new data, and provided a large scale picture of what is occurring in classroom pedagogy for Indigenous students.

Regarding educational and attendance outcomes the report said:

The analysis of school level attendance from 2008–2011, school-level NAPLAN gain scores from 2008–2011, and cohort-level NAPLAN gain scores from 2009–2010 show no evidence of positive SSLC [Stronger Smarter Learning Communities Project] effects.

…

There is no statistically significant evidence of improved attendance or test score performance.

In the article Chris Sarra stretches the gap on credibility Janet Albrechtsen of The Australian wrote regarding the report:

Sarra told The Weekend Australian he was "reasonably content with the tone and findings of the report". Not so content as to include them on the website. Sarra says the report covered only a short period of time for many schools. That is true. But it is no excuse for not making the report accessible to the public. Transparency surely demands it.

After this newspaper put questions to Sarra as to why there was no link to the report, a link was added with a summary of the findings.

It cannot be said enough: what matters is how Sarra's taxpayer-funded programs are lifting student performance so that the government can say they are spending their money wisely given the critical goal of closing the gap of Year 12 completion.

== Views on indigenous education ==
Chris Sarra's PhD, published in 2011 as 'Strong and Smart - Towards a Pedagogy for Emancipation' draws on Roy Bhaskar's theory of Critical Realism to demonstrate how Indigenous people have agency and can take control of their own liberation. The book contrasts white perceptions of what it is to be Indigenous and Indigenous views of what it is to be an Aboriginal Australian. In the book, Sarra called for Indigenous Australians to radically transform and not only reproduce the identity that Mainstream white Australia has fostered for them. Sarra showed that it is important for Indigenous students to have confidence in their own strength as any other group within society.

In 2008, Sarra said that Aboriginal Australia was being 'let down' by 'white trash' workers in education, health, policy and public services who hide in remote communities knowing they would never last in mainstream centres. Sarra said Aboriginal people were blamed and held accountable for the dysfunction in their communities, but the people providing them were not subject to the same scrutiny.

Sarra said,

"The schools we create must be places that Aboriginal children and parents can connect with. They must be places in which it is OK to dream great things. They must be places that say to children, 'I believe in you"

Later, Sarra expressed regret about using the term, and explained his comments were born out of frustration and he did not intend to undermine the hard work and dedication of many white teachers working hard in remote communities. In his autobiography (page 310), Sarra explains that things have changed since then, and it is now understood that for remote schools a teacher must be 'top gun'.

In 2014, Sarra presented the Griffith Review annual lecture, where he called for the rejection of the victim status often being applied to being Aboriginal and argued for a new style of Aboriginal and non-Aboriginal leadership to achieve honourable and sustainable outcomes. He said this relationship needs to be based on respect and high expectations rather than victimhood or victim blaming. Sarra has questioned the government's roll out of Direct Instruction (DI) in remote Aboriginal schools. In 2012 he said, "It is time for Aboriginal people and poor white Queenslanders to say we want high expectations and we want excellence from our schools because that is what is transformative, that is what enables us to transcend the challenges we confront day to day." In 2015, Sarra expressed concerns about the Cape York trial of DI, saying that other remote schools were getting better results in NAPLAN. He suggested the plans to roll out DI across remote communities in Northern Australia could be a long-lasting and expensive mistake.

== Tenure at the Australian Rugby League Commission ==
Sarra was appointed to the newly independent Australian Rugby League Commission (ARLC) in February 2012.

In February 2013 Percy Knight, the Chairperson of the ARL Indigenous Council was sacked. Percy Knight had only become Chairperson of the ARL Indigenous Council in August 2012. Chris Sarra was involved in events leading to the sacking. Percy Knight said of the sacking: "There is rampant racism within the NRL's administration and it is very toxic." Knight explained the reasons for tensions within the ARL Indigenous Council that lead to his dismissal: "There are no black fellas involved with One Community. We don't want to be grouped with Polynesians or Maoris. We are first Australians." One Community is the ARLC's community arm, distributing grants to grassroots football including indigenous Rugby grants.

In a letter to Sarra, Aboriginal Rugby great Larry Corowa stated: "Chris, how do you live with yourself in the knowledge that you played a prominent and key role in our demise from ARLIC [ARL Indigenous Council]?"

Larry Corowa also addressed Sarra saying "Is this the Aboriginal way or the Coconut way?" (As explained in The Advertiser: "The term "coconut" is a deeply offensive racial slur, suggesting an Aboriginal is black on the outside but white on the inside."). Corowa said of the ARL Indigenous Council: "The council is there to tick the boxes for white fellas, for the NRL and John Grant." When Larry Corowa was asked if Chris Sarra should resign, he said: "Yes, he should resign immediately. The community had a meeting two weeks ago in Sydney and people voted no confidence in him as a commissioner. They don't want him representing Aboriginal people in rugby league."

In response to Knight's and Corowa's attacks in the media, Sarra offered to meet with Knight to address allegations the Aboriginal body lacked a voice in rugby league. Sarra said, "We won't solve anything with a public slanging match. Let's sit down and have a respectful conversation about the issues concerned and what the solutions might be.' Larry Corowa responded: "We have asked One Community how much the All Stars game generates and they say they will get back to us at the next meeting, They don't want to tell us exactly how much money is made."

== Honours ==
- 2016 Person of the Year, NAIDOC Awards
- 2004 Queenslander of the Year
- 2010 Queensland's Australian of the Year
- QUT: 2004 Chancellor's Outstanding Alumnus and Faculty of Education Award Winner
