= Australian Walkabout =

- Created by: Charles Chauvel; Elsa Chauvel
- Country of origin: Australia
- Original language: English
- No. of seasons: 1
- No. of episodes: 13

Production
- Running time: 26 mins

Original release
- Network: BBC
- Release: 1958 – 1958

Australian Walkabout is a TV series made for the ABC and BBC by director Charles Chauvel. It was the last project completed by Chauvel prior to his death.

Lee Robinson later got the rights to the series and sold it to Germany and Japan.
