= Screen Test (film) =

- Directed by: Charles Chauvel; S. Sylvan Simon
- Produced by: Charles Chauvel
- Starring: Charles Chauvel; Kay Hughes; S. Sylvan Simon; Jack Pierce; Cesar Romero; Betty Pike
- Narrated by: K.W. Pawley
- Cinematography: Tasman Higgins; Stanley Cortez
- Production companies: Charles Chauvel; Universal
- Release date: 1937
- Country: Australia
- Language: English

Screen Test is a 1937 short Australian documentary directed by Charles Chauvel about how screen tests are conducted.

Brisbane girl Betty Pike features in the film and was signed to Charles Chauvel. When the film was released, Chauvel held a screen test competition to promote it.
