= Elsa Chauvel =

Australian filmmaker, actress (1898–1983)

Elsa Chauvel OBE
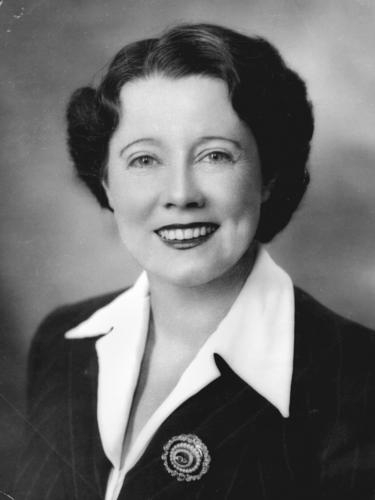
- Chauvel in 1940
- Born: Elsie May Wilcox; 10 February 1898; Collingwood, Victoria, Australia
- Died: 22 August 1983 (aged 85); Toowoomba, Queensland, Australia
- Occupations: Filmmaker; actress
- Spouse: Charles Chauvel (m. 1927; died 1959)

Elsa Chauvel (née Elsie May Wilcox; 10 February 1898 – 22 August 1983) was an Australian filmmaker and actress, and the wife and collaborator of film director Charles Chauvel. Elsa Chauvel was a pioneer in Australian film making, best known for her contributions to films such as Greenhide, In the Wake of the Bounty, and Jedda. Her legacy in Australian film was celebrated with the creation of the Chauvel Award, dedicated to the work of Elsa and Charles Chauvel, which honours Australian excellence in film.

== Early years ==
Elsa Chauvel was born Elsie May Wilcox in the Melbourne suburb of Collingwood on 10 February 1898. Her parents were Irish actor Edward Wilcox, also known by his stage name Edward Sylvaney, and Australian Ada Worrill. Elsa had an elder brother named Kyrle. In her early years, Elsa was often involved in her parents' theatrical performances, often under the name Elsie Sylvaney. While still a child, Elsa and her family travelled to South Africa, where they formed a travelling troupe. Elsa and Kyrle typically portrayed children onstage, but also used makeup to play adults when necessary. When the success of the family's shows waned, they returned to Cape Town, where, in 1909, youngest sibling Terry was born. Following World War One, in which Kyrle fought, the family travelled to Johannesburg. Here, Elsa performed in chorus lines, and later appeared in such plays as The Thirteenth Chair, A Royal Divorce, and Sign of the Cross. Elsa was cast in the play The Silent Witness, which gave her a great deal of recognition in Johannesburg, therefore creating greater acting opportunities. Following a successful stage tour in Basutoland, the family returned to Australia in 1924.

== Marriage to Charles Chauvel ==
Elsa first met her future-husband Charles Chauvel in 1926, following a performance of the musical Crackers at the Cremorne Theatre in Brisbane, Queensland. Charles was scouting for a leading lady for his second film, Greenhide. Though initially reluctant to audition for the part, she was persuaded by Charles to give a screentest, and was cast for the role. Charles and Elsa were married on 5 June 1927, at St James Church, Sydney. The ceremony officiated by Charles' brother, the Reverend John Chauvel. After moving to Hollywood in 1928, the Chauvels tried to find American distributors for Charles' films but were unsuccessful in the emerging sound-on-film era. The pair had their daughter, Susanne, in 1930, after having returned to Queensland during the Depression when finances were tight for independent filmmakers. Following her marriage, Elsa performed on stage only occasionally, such as her 1929 season in San Francisco with Conway Tearle. In order to support her family and herself, Elsa would give dancing and elocution lessons. This was often necessary between films when the Chauvels were trying to recover from expensive film projects. The couple were considered to represent a strong sense of Australian nationalism in the wake of the First World War for their hard work and ambition. In women’s magazines of the era, they were even considered to be the exemplar Australian couple at the time.

== Work in film ==
In addition to starring in Greenhide, Elsa Chauvel was a frequent collaborator in her husband's work and was active in various behind-the-scenes roles. She had traveled with Charles following the creation of Greenhide, to local exhibitors to show their film even though it cost them a great deal to play their own instead of larger American films. Elsa often referred to herself as a "Girl Friday," but it has been remarked that "her occasional credits on the films do not do justice to her endless contributions." At first, Elsa's contributions were uncredited. Knowing that independent filmmaking in Australia could not compete with Hollywood films in that era, specifically in terms of script writing, the Chauvels looked to create their own Australian style of film. While in California with Charles, Elsa looked to help promote his career over her own, even going so far as to decline an offer from Universal to appear in their films.

Elsa accompanied Charles and cameraman Tasman Higgins to Pitcairn Island and Tahiti to film scenes for In the Wake of the Bounty (1933). Elsa was credited (under the pseudonym Ann Wynn) as production assistant on Heritage (1935), in which she also portrayed the character Mrs Macquarie. She was also an assistant director on her husband’s film, Uncivilised (1936), again credited as Ann Wynn. In this film, she acted as a body double for actress Margot Rhys while riding a camel. She later co-wrote the screenplays for Rangle River (1937), Forty Thousand Horsemen (1940), The Rats of Tobruk (1944), Sons of Matthew (1949) and Jedda (1955). Elsa served as associate producer on Sons of Matthew and dialogue director on Jedda. Her various other duties included actor coaching, costume design, research, and make-up.

=== Jedda (1955) ===
The research done for the script of Jedda (1955) required Elsa and Charles to travel to the Australian outback in 1952 and conduct location surveys in the East Kimberleys, moving North after this to shoot the film. The film, which used the theme of colonialism and Australian Aboriginal actors, was unique in the sense that this was rarely done. Jedda was the first feature film in which Aboriginal actors were cast in lead roles, including Rosalie Kunoth-Monks and Robert Tudawali. Rosalie Kunoth-Monks, just fifteen at the time, was brought on set for two weeks before she started acting, leaving the Church of England Girls’ Hostel in Alice Springs, to introduce her to filmmaking. It also featured a woman as the lead in the film, played by Betty Suttor, which was also not common in this era. Post-production for the film occurred in London. Jedda would end up being Charles Chauvel’s last feature film before his death.

== Later years ==
On 11 November 1959, Charles Chauvel died unexpectedly from coronary vascular disease. It was extremely important to Chauvel that Australian film and her husband's legacy in the industry be remembered through his work. On 13 June 1964, she was awarded the Order of the British Empire, "in recognition of service to the Australian film industry." By this point, she had amassed a large collection of prints for her and her husband’s films, which were preserved with the help of the Australian national film archive. In 1973, she published a memoir, My Life with Charles Chauvel. Elsa moved from Sydney to Toowoomba, Queensland in 1977. She died there on 22 August 1983.

== Legacy ==
In honour of the contribution made to filmmaking by Elsa and Charles Chauvel, the Chauvel Award was created in 1992 to celebrate those who have made an impact on the Australian film industry.

In 2018, the 20th recipient of this award was Australian producer Sue Milliken, who received the award at the 2018 Gold Coast Film Festival, said "I have always been a great admirer of Charles and Elsa Chauvel, who were pioneers of our industry with a grand vision for Australian films and Australian stories. It is such an honour to stand in their shadow."

== Filmography ==
=== Film ===
List of Elsa Chauvel film credits
Year	Title	Role	Notes
1926	Greenhide	actor	as Elsie Sylvaney
1933	In the Wake of the Bounty		uncredited
1935	Heritage	actor / production assistant	as Ann Wynn
1936	Uncivilised	assistant-director	
1937	Rangle River	co-writer	
1940	Forty Thousand Horsemen	co-writer	
1944	The Rats of Tobruk	co-writer	
1949	Sons of Matthew	co-writer / associate-producer	
1955	Jedda	co-writer / dialogue director	

=== Television ===
List of Elsa Chauvel television credits
Year	Title	Role	Notes
1956–57	Walkabout	narrator / producer	uncredited; also known as Australian Walkabout
