= Charles Chauvel (filmmaker) =

Australian filmmaker (1897–1959)

Charles Chauvel OBE
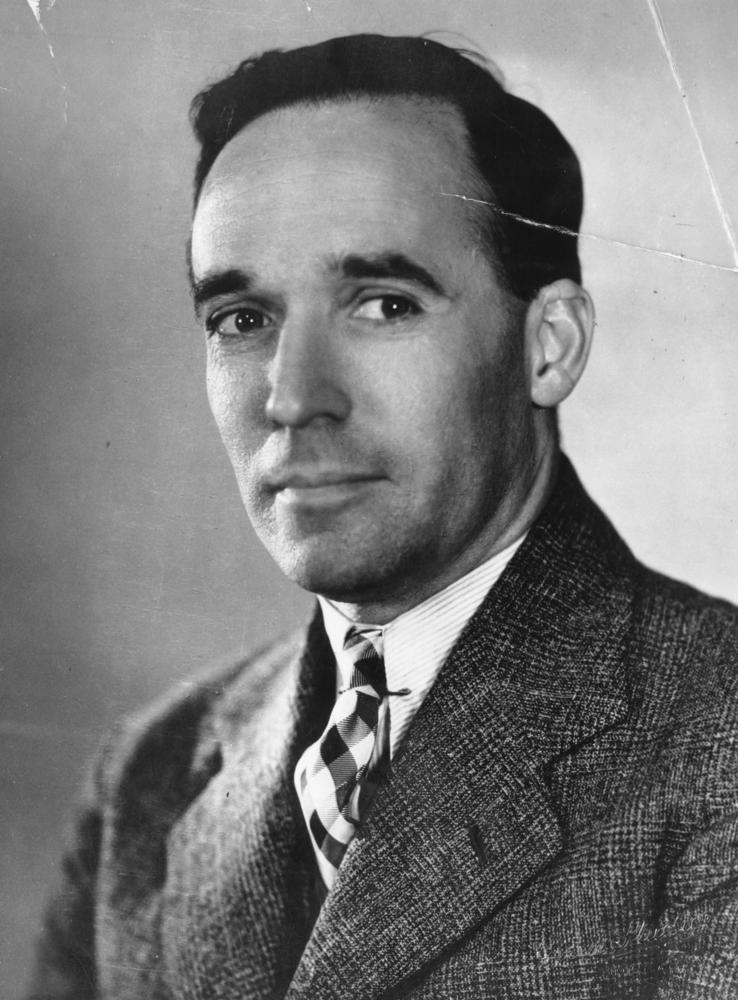
- Chauvel in 1936
- Born: Charles Edward Chauvel; 7 October 1897; Warwick, Queensland, Australia
- Died: 11 November 1959 (aged 62); Sydney, New South Wales, Australia
- Occupations: Film director, producer, actor, screenwriter
- Spouse: Elsa Chauvel (m. 1927)

Charles Edward Chauvel (7 October 1897 – 11 November 1959) was an Australian filmmaker, producer, actor, and screenwriter. He is noted for writing and directing the films Forty Thousand Horsemen in 1940 and Jedda in 1955. His wife, Elsa Chauvel, formerly an actress, was a frequent and valuable collaborator on her husband's filmmaking projects.

== Early life ==
=== Family ===
Charles Edward Chauvel was born on 7 October 1897 in Warwick, Queensland, the son of James Allan Chauvel and his wife Susan Isabella (née Barnes), pioneer farmers in the Mutdapilly area. He was the nephew of General Sir Harry Chauvel, Commander of the Australian Light Horse and later the Desert Mounted Corps in Palestine during World War I. His father, a grazier, at 53 also enlisted to serve in Palestine and Sinai in World War I. The Chauvels were descended from a French Huguenot family who fled France for England in 1685, and soon established a tradition of serving in the British army. The Australian Chauvels descended from a Charles Chauvel who retired from the Indian Army to New South Wales in 1839 and was a pioneer in the New England region.

Chauvel was educated at the Normanby State School (now the Mutdapilly State School), The Southport School and Ipswich Grammar School in Queensland.

=== Early film work ===
After leaving school, he worked on Queensland properties, and on his family property when his father was at war, before studying commercial art and taking drama classes in Sydney. He was fascinated by films and pestered a friend, showman Reginald "Snowy" Baker, to give him work as a production assistant; usually, he was the man in charge of the horses. Chauvel worked on The Shadow of Lightning Ridge (1920) and The Jackeroo of Coolabong (1920) with Baker; he also assisted on Robbery Under Arms (1920)

He designed the St Aidan's Church of England in Mutdapilly in 1921 (the church closed in 1974 and is now used as a private residence).

=== Hollywood ===
Chauvel followed Baker to Hollywood in 1922, at his own expense, and spent some time as a jack of all trades, including working as an extra, a lighting technician, a publicist, and a stunt double. The films he worked on included Strangers of the Night (1923).

== Director ==
=== Moth of Moonbi (1926) ===
Back in Australia after about a year, Chauvel obtained finance from Queensland businessmen and friends to make his first film The Moth of Moonbi. It is a romantic melodrama exploring the theme of decadent city vs authentic country. The Moth of Moonbi tells the story of a country girl who flutters to the city lights, loses her fortune, but eventually returns home and finds love with her father's trusty stockman. An amusing interlude comes when we see Charles Chauvel himself (in blackface) in the role of an Aboriginal stockman wooing his pretty neighbour Billy Stokes (also in blackface).

The film was profitable enough for Chauvel to raise funds for a second film.

=== Greenhide (1926) ===
In Greenhide a city girl struggles to cope on a cattle station and gradually finds love with her polar opposite, an extremely taciturn bushman. Like Moonbi the film was made in Harrisville near Brisbane, enlisting locals as extras and using locations around the family property "Summerlands", near the edge of town. It was while making Greenhide that Chauvel met and cast actress Elsa May Wilcox (whose stage name was Elsa Sylvaney), to whom he was married in 1927. After their marriage she travelled with him and assisted him on all his films.

Both these silent films were released in 1926 and met with reasonable success in Australia. Unfortunately, in 1928 Charles & Elsa took them to Hollywood in search of a distributor, just as the transition to sound was kicking off. Not surprisingly, no one wanted them.

Chauvel returned to Australia and worked as a cinema manager during the Depression.

=== In the Wake of the Bounty (1933) ===
In 1933 he made his first talkie: In the Wake of the Bounty starring Errol Flynn as Fletcher Christian before Flynn went on to Hollywood. The film mixed re-enactments with documentary, and focused not so much on the mutiny itself as on its consequences. To provide a long postscript to the story of the mutiny, the Chauvels went to Pitcairn Island and shot interesting footage of the Bounty descendants, spending three months on the island. He also included footage of bare-breasted Tahitian dancers which caused a temporary problem with the censors. The documentary parts were later edited out and used as promotional material for the 1935 Hollywood film about the mutiny. Chauvel's interest in the famous mutiny was not fortuitous: when he was a youth he read Bligh's original log, which one of his father's neighbours owned at the time.

=== Heritage (1935) ===
In 1935, Chauvel won a Commonwealth Government competition for Heritage which gave a panoramic view of Australian history. It begins with a character from the earliest days of white settlement (1788), following his struggles, his loves and his marriage, then skips to the modern generation, where a romance between descendants of the original characters completes a circle. The modern hero is struggling to run an outback cattle station, the modern heroine is an expert aviator.

=== Uncivilised (1936) ===
In 1936 he made Uncivilised, a "jungle story" filmed in Cape York, in Far North Queensland, Australia. Aimed at the U.S. market, it is the story of an upper class "girl-reporter" investigating the white leader of an Aboriginal tribe. A humorous anecdote is told about the making of the film: one of the Aboriginal extras - a giant of a man who carried a spear - took an instant dislike to the leading man, an English actor who was a bit of a ham. The latter is said to have carried on in mortal fear of his life.

That year also saw the release of Rangle River (1936), based on a script by Charles and Elsa Chauvel.

=== Forty Thousand Horsemen (1940) ===
Chauvel began work on this classic in 1937, both his father & uncle having taken part in the famous cavalry charge that forms the centrepiece of the film. The outbreak of WW II assured him of a ready audience for a war-themed movie. Forty Thousand Horsemen was released in 1940 as a tribute to the Australian Light Horse Brigade in Palestine in World War I. It was made for the most part in the Cronulla sand dunes between Kurnell & Wanda & met with both popular and critical success. Besides being a morale booster, it helped launch the careers of actors Chips Rafferty. Grant Taylor & Michael Pate.

Chauvel subsequently made a series of propaganda shorts to bolster the Australian war effort including Soldiers Without Uniform (1942).

=== Rats of Tobruk (1944) ===
Chauvel attempted to repeat his Horseman success with The Rats of Tobruk in 1944. It was not as successful perhaps because the focus of the action is not limited to the Libyan desert, as the title expressly implies.

=== Sons of Matthew (1949) ===
After the war he made a film about a pioneer family in Queensland, Sons of Matthew (1949), drawing on his own family history & on two books by writer Bernard O'Reilly.

=== Jedda (1955) ===
In 1955, Chauvel released Jedda, perhaps his best known film. It is the story of an orphan Aboriginal baby girl who is adopted by the wife of a white station owner after her own baby dies. Jedda is raised as a white girl and kept in ignorance of the traditional ways of her own people. At the age of 16, she becomes engaged to the station's mixed-race head stockman but is carried off by Marbuk, a full-blood renegade and a fugitive from the law.

Jedda was filmed for the most part on location in the Northern Territory. Interiors were filmed at the Avondale Studios at Turrella, Sydney, while the film's final sequence was shot at Kanangra Walls in the Blue Mountains, southwest of Sydney. Jedda was the first Australian feature shot in colour; the film needed to be developed in London as there were no colour processing facilities in Australia at the time. To make Jedda, the Chauvels sought out Aboriginal people for the lead roles: Rosalie Kunoth (Jedda) was scouted at an Anglican hostel in Alice Springs, while lead actor Robert Tudawali (Marbuk), a Melville Islander, was found in Darwin, where he had been working as a motor mechanic.

Like his preceding effort, Jedda was made at a time when the Australian film industry had virtually collapsed, unable to compete with imported films. It was released early in 1955, a year before television came to Australia.

== Final years and death ==
After this, Chauvel turned to television, making the ABC series Australian Walkabout (1958) which, like the radio series that preceded it, covered interesting locations in Australia. The series was commissioned by the BBC, following the interest generated by Jedda. He died unexpectedly of coronary vascular disease on 11 November 1959, less than a month after Errol Flynn, whom he cast in In the Wake of the Bounty. According to Ken G. Hall, Chauvel had left a message asking to speak to Hall on the day he died, and left an estate worth £32,000.

== Legacy ==
In honour of the contribution made to filmmaking by Elsa and Charles Chauvel, the Chauvel Award was created in 1992 to celebrate those who have made an impact on the Australian film industry. It is awarded annually at the Gold Coast Film Festival.

Chauvel Cinema, an art-house cinema in the Sydney suburb of Paddington, is named after him.

Chauvel was posthumously inducted into the Queensland Business Leaders Hall of Fame in 2013.

In 2009 as part of the Q150 celebrations, Charles Chauvel was announced as one of the Q150 Icons of Queensland for his role as an "Influential Artist".

== Filmography ==
=== Film ===
Year	Title	Role	Notes
1920	Robbery Under Arms	actor	directed by Kenneth Brampton
1920	The Shadow of Lightning Ridge	actor	directed by Wilfred Lucas
1920	The Jackeroo of Coolabong	actor	directed by Wilfred Lucas
1922	Captain Fly-By-Night	actor	
1922	The Man from the Desert	actor	
1923	Strangers of the Night	actor	
1926	The Moth of Moonbi	director / producer / screenwriter	
1926	Greenhide	director / producer / screenwriter	
1933	In the Wake of the Bounty	director / producer / screenwriter	
1935	Heritage	director / producer / screenwriter	
1936	Uncivilised	director / producer / screenwriter	
1936	Rangle River	screenwriter (with Elsa Chauvel)	directed by Clarence G. Badger
1937	Screen Test	director / producer	
1940	Forty Thousand Horsemen	director / producer / screenwriter	
1942	Soldiers Without Uniform	director / producer	documentary short
1942	Power to Win	director / producer	documentary short
1943	A Mountain Goes to Sea	director / producer	documentary short
1943	While There is Still Time	director / producer	documentary short
1943	Russia Aflame	director / producer	documentary short
1944	The Rats of Tobruk	director / producer / screenwriter	
1949	Sons of Matthew	director / producer / screenwriter	
1955	Jedda	director / producer / screenwriter	

=== Television ===
Year	Title	Role	Notes
1958	Australian Walkabout	director / producer / screenwriter	produced for the ABC and BBC

== Unmade projects ==
Chauvel announced a number of projects over the years that were not made, including:

- Conflict – a project for which Chauvel registered scripts in 1930 and 1933
- adaptation of the novel Geoffrey Hamlyn about early Australian pioneers
- a script called The Man from Down Under which Chauvel registered in 1941
- adaptation of the novel My Love Must Wait by Ernestine Hill about the life of Matthew Flinders – Chauvel claimed he paid a record price for an Australian novel to get the rights and gave a copy of the novel to Laurence Olivier during his 1948 tour of Australia in an attempt to interest him in playing Flinders
- the life of boxer Les Darcy starring Tommy Burns
- adaptation of the novel When Cobb and Co Was King by Will Lawson
- adaptation of the novel Wards of the Outer March by Kathleen Glasson Taylor, a story of convict-bushranger days'
- wartime documentary about the wool industry.
