= List of Out of the Blue characters =

This is a list of the characters from the BBC television soap opera Out of the Blue. The BBC announced the commissioning of Out of the Blue on 30 November 2007.

== Characters ==
Gabby West (Sophie Katinis) is a high school PE and science teacher. She lives in a small apartment close to the beach in Manly with Poppy and Peta, and teaches a weekly boot camp on the beach. Her closest friend is Jarrod, and she's in a secret relationship with Paul, Jarrod's younger brother.

Bec Quilter (Renai Caruso) is a surgeon. Her closest friends are Gabby, Poppy and Stavva. She was Jarrod's first love. Bec's parents are divorced and live in Sydney.

Jarrod O'Donnell (Clayton Watson) is owner/operator of his own Nursery and Landscaping business. He is married to Tracy and the father of Zoe. His father is Ron and his brothers are Addo and Paul. Jarrod's mother, Diane, is dead.

Tracy O'Donnell (Charlotte Gregg) is married to Jarrod, mother of Zoe. She is the partner and bookkeeper in their Nursery/Landscaping business. Tracy's foster family live in New South Wales. Tracy was the school captain, head of debating, head of the school magazine and head of the student union at high school. Tracy and Jarrod are trying for another baby.

Poppy Hammond (Katherine Hicks) is the partner of Peta, and granddaughter of Olive. She has three unfinished university degrees and has dabbled in floristry, midwifery, anthropology and abseiling instruction, among other things.

Ian "Stavva" Jones (Ryan Johnson) is the son of Pia and Brian, and the brother of Lucia. He works at the family café, 'Bacino'. His best friend is Addo. Stavva still lives at home with his parents, and drives a souped up Monaro known as the "Stavva-mobile".

Paul O' Donnell (Nathaniel Buzolic) Paul's a cricketing prodigy, but also loves surfing, partying and thinking about Gabby.
