= John Atkinson (actor) =

Australian actor

- Born: 11 July 1967; Melbourne Australia
- Died: 28 January 2026 (aged 58); Chippendale, NSW, Australia
- Education: Western Australian Academy of Performing Arts
- Occupation: Actor
- Years active: 1998–2014
- Family: Kate Atkinson (sister)

John Atkinson was an Australian actor.

== Early life ==
Atkinson was the older brother of actress Kate Atkinson. He was a graduate of the Western Australian Academy of Performing Arts.

== Career ==
Atkinson's first television role was in Channel 9's risqué soap opera Chances, when he took over the main role of Cal Lawrence from Gerry Sont in 1992. He then had a recurring guest role in critically-acclaimed and award-winning ABC legal drama series Janus in 1994. He also featured alongside Hugh Jackman in ABC drama Correlli in 1995, playing the recurring role of Officer Reid.

Atkinson made his breakthrough screen appearance in 1998, in Australian soap opera Breakers, playing the role of 28-year-old Steve Giordano, manager and youth mentor at homeless kids' agency, 'Against The Tide'. He appeared in the series until 1999, acting alongside Ada Nicodemou and James Stewart.

In 2002, Atkinson knocked back a role in a US movie to accept a role in 13-part SBS television drama TwentyfourSeven, playing one of the main roles of production editor and chief sub, Nick Kaldor. Set in the office of a weekly entertainment and information magazine, the series was the world's first interactive television drama, where viewers were able to vote on a choice of three storylines for the next episode – 'choose your own adventure'-style.

Atkinson portrayed producer Les Markowitz in the fictionalised 2005 American television movie / docudrama Dynasty: The Making of a Guilty Pleasure, based on the creation and behind the scenes production of the 1980s prime time soap opera Dynasty. He also portrayed Roger McIvor in several episodes of the Australian television drama McLeod's Daughters between 2005 and 2007, and appeared twice on the Australian medical drama All Saints, in 2003 and 2007.

Atkinson played Detective Parks in the 2007 American miniseries The Starter Wife alongside Debra Messing. He then had an ongoing lead role as Stephen Mulroney in Australian soap opera Out of the Blue from 2008 to 2009, opposite Diane Craig, Zoe Carides, Ryan Johnson and Daniel Henshall. He next played boat owner and psychopathic killer Derrick Quaid in long-running soap opera Home and Away, from 2009 to 2010.

Atkinson had a role in 2010 feature film 33 Postcards opposite Guy Pearce and Claudia Karvan, also reuniting with his Out of the Blue co-star Clayton Watson.

Atkinson also appeared in an international television advertisement for Land Rover Discovery, playing the part of a guy who stripped off and grabbed a spear to go fishing.

== Personal life ==
Like his Breakers character Steve Giordano, Sydney-based Atkinson was working at a drop-in centre in the suburb of Pyrmont between acting roles in 2002, after meeting a youth worker at a pub in Glebe.

== Filmography ==
=== Television ===
| Year | Title | Role | Notes | Ref. |
|---|---|---|---|---|
| 1992 | Chances | Cal Lawrence | 13 episodes | |
| 1994 | Janus | Nick | 3 episodes | |
| 1994; 1996 | Blue Heelers | Sullo / George Yammouni | 2 episodes | |
| 1995 | Halifax f.p. | Reporter | 1 episode | |
| 1995 | Correlli | Officer Reid | 3 episodes | |
| 1997 | State Coroner | Dylan McQuarie | | |
| 1998–1999 | Breakers | Steve Giordano | 396 episodes | |
| 2000 | Chameleon 3: Dark Angel | Grim the Rottweiler Dealer | TV movie | |
| 2002 | TwentyfourSeven | Nick Kaldor | | |
| 2002 | Crash Palace | Noddy | 2 episodes | |
| 2002 | Blood Crime (aka Hearts of Men) | Redmond Sawyer | TV movie | |
| 2003; 2007 | All Saints | Barry Mitchell / Sean Callahan | 2 episodes | |
| 2005 | Dynasty: The Making of a Guilty Pleasure | Les Markowitz | TV movie | |
| 2005; 2007 | McLeod's Daughters | Roger McIvor | 5 episodes | |
| 2006 | Fatal Contact: Bird Flu in America | Ed Connolly | TV movie | |
| 2007 | One of the Lucky Ones | Wendy's boyfriend | TV movie | |
| 2007 | The Starter Wife | Detective Parkes | Miniseries, 3 episodes | |
| 2008 | Out of the Blue | Stephen Mulroney | 74 episodes | |
| 2009 | Legend of the Seeker | Captain Krimmel | 1 episode | |
| 2009–2010; 2020–2021 | Home and Away | Derrick Quaid / Sergeant Cooper | 17 episodes | |
| 2010 | Cops L.A.C. | Mr. Timochenko | 1 episode | |
| 2011 | Cloudstreet | Banjo player | Miniseries, 1 episode | |

=== Film ===
| Year | Title | Role | Notes | Ref. |
|---|---|---|---|---|
| 2010 | 33 Postcards | Chalmers | Feature film | |
