= Charlotte Gregg =

Australian actress

- Born: Charlotte Gregg; December 1978 / January 1979
- Other name: Charlotte Carr
- Education: St John Paul College, Coffs Harbour (1991–1996); University of Southern Queensland
- Occupations: Actress, blogger
- Years active: 2002–
- Known for: All My Friends Are Leaving Brisbane (2007); Home and Away (2006); Underbelly (2008); Out of the Blue (2008)
- Spouse: Wes Carr
- Children: 2

Charlotte Gregg (born December 1978 / January 1979), also known as Charlotte Carr, is an Australian actress and blogger.

== Early life ==
According to her MySpace page, Gregg was Miss Teen New South Wales in 1993 and graduated in 1996 as an alumna of St John Paul College, Coffs Harbour in New South Wales from 1991 to 1996.

Gregg studied at the University of Southern Queensland, graduating with a Bachelor of Theatre Arts.

== Career ==
Gregg began her career in theatre, performing in stage productions for La Boite, Queensland Theatre Company and Belvoir Street Theatre, before moving into screen work, beginning with a role in 2002 television film Seconds to Spare, opposite Antonio Sabàto Jr. and Kimberley Davies.

In 2005, Gregg had a guest role in medical drama All Saints, before landing a role in long-running soap opera Home and Away, playing the recurring role of Charity Fernbrook, a member of 'The Believers' cult, who was previously a midwife. The character was brought back by force by Mama Rose to induce the labour of Tasha (Isabel Lucas). She then played the lead character of Anthea in the 2007 romantic comedy film All My Friends Are Leaving Brisbane, alongside Ryan Johnson.

In 2008, Gregg had a role as crime witness Taylor in the first season of Underbelly. That same year, she joined the ensemble cast of BBC-commissioned Australian drama Out of the Blue, in the main part of 30-year old Tracy O'Donnell, book-keeper, stay-at-home mum and wife of Jarrod O'Donnell (Clayton Watson). The role reunited her with All My Friends Are Leaving Brisbane co-star Johnson, as well as seeing her appear alongside Zoe Carides, Diane Craig, Daniel Henshall and Samara Weaving. She starred in 85 episodes of the series.

The following year, Gregg had guest roles in Packed to the Rafters and police procedural series Rush. In 2010, Gregg played the role of the shallow and jealous Dimity in comedy feature film Jucy, alongside Johnson once more That same year, she had guest roles in drama series Spirited and comedy series Lowdown. In 2012, she made a second guest appearance in Lowdown, as well as playing a guest role in comedy-drama series Offspring, opposite Asher Keddie. The following year she guested in drama series Wonderland.

More recently, Gregg was the lead actor in six-part comedy series The Carers, of which she was also the creator. The pilot of the series was the winner of the Sunny Coast Showdown – Showdown Max in 2025.

Gregg has also voiced TV advertisements for KFC, Coca-Cola, Uncle Tobys and Cadbury Cherry Ripe. Additionally, as a food and health blogger, Gregg the cookbook Bubba Yum Yum: The Paleo Way for New Mums, Babies and Toddlers, with celebrity chef Pete Evans and nutritionist Helen Padarin. The book raised controversy after being called “potentially deadly for babies” by health experts.

== Personal life ==
Gregg met musician and Australian Idol 2008 season 6 winner Wes Carr at a barbecue in 2008. They were married in April 2012, after which they honeymooned in Europe. Gregg gave birth to her first child, Willow Harrison Carr in Sydney on 5 November 2012. He was born with a compromised gut and immune system.

Wanting to get out of the city, Gregg and family moved from Sydney to the Sunshine Coast in 2016, where they bought a house. The couple then had a second child called Jackson.

In 2021, Gregg and family relocated to Nashville, Tennessee, to pursue Carr's dream of becoming a country music star in the States. They had to get special permission to do so, because the Australian borders were closed, due to the COVID-19 pandemic. They returned to Australia in late 2024, settling on the Sunshine Coast.

== Filmography ==
=== Film ===
Year	Title	Role	Type	Ref.
2006	All Is Forgiven	Telephone Booth 2 Woman	Short film	
2007	All My Friends Are Leaving Brisbane	Anthea	Feature film	
	Chucky		Short film	
	The Statue		Short film	
2008	Punishment	Susan Rogen	Feature film	
2009	Beyond Words	Girl	Short film	
2010	Jucy	Dimity	Film	
2012	Dave's Dead	Jacquie	Short film	

=== Television ===
Year	Title	Role	Type	Ref.
2002	Seconds to Spare	Beatrice	TV movie	
2003	Fat Cow Motel	Cathy / Rhonda	Miniseries, episode: #1.13	
2005	All Saints	Rebecca Rowe	3 episodes, "Time and Tide", "Thicker Than Water" and "In Sickness and in Health"	
2006	Home and Away	Charity Fernbrook	5 episodes	
2008	Underbelly	Lilla Rigby	Episode 1: "The Black Prince"	
2008	Out of the Blue	Tracy O'Donnell	84 episodes	
2009	Packed to the Rafters	Elly	Episode 6: "Little Arrows"	
2009	Rush	Shay	Episode: "#2.12"	
2009	Sea Princesses	Voice	52 episodes	
2011	Me and My Monsters	News Broadcaster	Episode 8: "The Next Big Thing"	
2010; 2012	Lowdown	Selina	2 episodes	
2013	Wonderland	Nadine	Episode 10: "Motherhood"	
2018	Stun Town	Carly		
TBA	The Carers	Lead role	Also creator	

=== Theatre ===
Year	Title	Role	Type	Ref.
2001	Clark in Sarajevo	Various roles	La Boite, Brisbane	
2003	Citizen Jane	Jane	Queensland Arts Council	
2003	Nerd Formal	Jacqui	Griffin Theatre Co	
2003	Balm in Gilead	Babe	The Group Theatre	
2004	Sleeping Around	Kate	Belvoir, Sydney with Night Parrot	

== Awards ==
Year	Work	Award	Category	Result	Ref.
2025	The Carers	4th Annual Sunny Coast Showdown – ShowdownMAX	—N/a	Won	
