= Andrew Ryan (actor) =

Australian actor

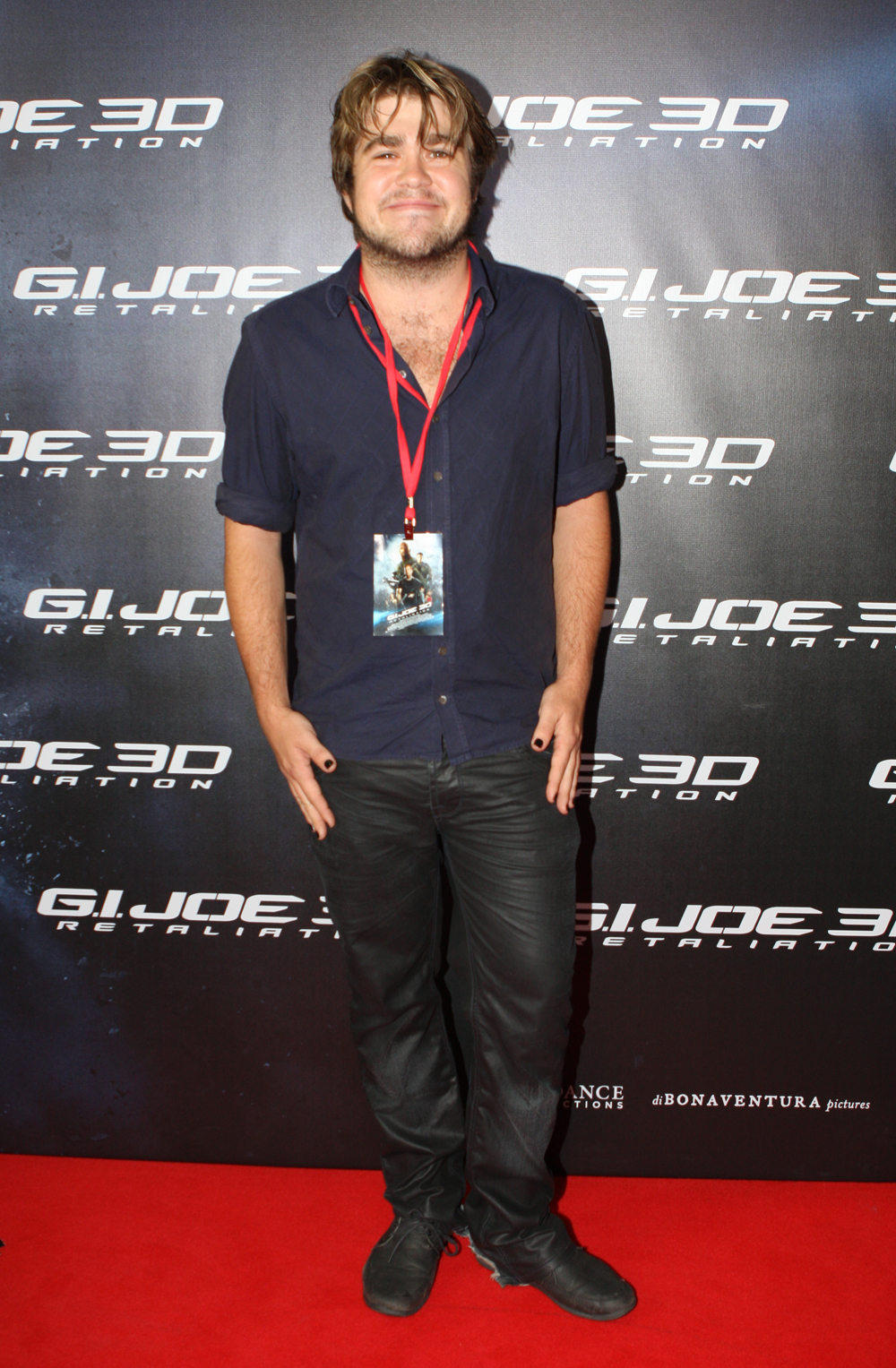
Andy Ryan at the G.I. JOE: RETALIATION - Red carpet movie premiere, Event Cinemas, Sydney, Australia

Andrew Ryan is an Australian actor best known for his performance as Chris Lang in the film of Tomorrow, When the War Began (2010) and as one of the stars of The Jesters. Originally from Brisbane, he played roles in the films All My Friends Are Leaving Brisbane and Jucy which were written specifically for him, and starred in a TV series, The Future Machine (2010) and Love Child. Ryan portrayed INXS keyboardist and main composer Andrew Farriss in the telemovie INXS: Never Tear Us Apart (2014) he also received an AACTA award nomination for this role.

In 2024, Ryan was named as part of the cast for ABC drama Plum.

== Selected credits ==
=== Film ===
Year	Title	Role	Type
2007	All My Friends Are Leaving Brisbane	Ash	Feature film
2008	A Match of Priorities	Stevo	Short
2008	The Black Balloon	Student on Bus	
2009	Lonely	Stevie	Short
2010	Jucy	Brett	Feature film
2010	Tomorrow, When the War Began	Chris Lang	Feature film
2011	Bird Therapy	Andy	Short
2011	The Office Mug	Allen	Short
2011	Wood	Tom	
2012	Careless Love	Mark	
2012	Not Suitable for Children	Cantzi	
2012	Gull	Sam	Short
2013	Spine	Benji	Short
2014	Lemon Tree Passage	Oscar	Feature film
2014	Kevin Needs to Make New Friends	Kevin	Short
2015	Last Cab to Darwin	Miner	
2015	The License	Andy	Short
2016	The Menkoff Method	Gary	
2016	Displaced	Dave	Short
2017	Dance Academy: The Movie	Johnno	
2019	A Quick Love Story	Steve	Short
2022	Uncle Wayne	Angus	Short
2023	The Appleton Ladies' Potato Race	Gavin Bunyan	Feature film
2024	The Fall Guy	Karaoke MC	

=== Television ===
Year	Title	Role	Notes	Ref
2000	Doctor Who: The Monthly Adventures	Albert	1 episode	
2007	All Saints	Rusty	1 episode	
2008	Double the Fist	Young Steve	1 episode	
2009–11	The Jesters	Zak Green	TV series	
2009	Chandon Pictures	Simon	1 episode	
2010	Not Available	Randal	TV movie	
2012	Two Files	Andy	TV movie	
2013	Underbelly	Angus Murray	4 episodes	
2013	Reef Doctors	Gus Cochrane	13 episodes	
2014	INXS: Never Tear Us Apart	Andrew Farriss	TV movie (AACTA Award Nomination)	
2014–16	Love Child	Simon Bowditch	TV series, seasons 2–4	
2015	Peter Allen: Not the Boy Next Door	Molly Meldrum	2 episodes	
2016	Rake	Stig	2 episodes	
2017	Janet King	Flynn Pearce	TV series, 8 episodes	
2017	Blue Murder: Killer Cop	Wayne Crofton	1 episode	
2018	Riot	Shane	TV movie	
2018	True Story with Hamish & Andy	Paul	1 episode	
2019	Hardball	Gary	1 episode	
2019	Squinters	Additional voice	1 episode	
2019	My Life Is Murder	Tom	1 episode	
2020	Operation Buffalo	Agent Cartwright	3 episodes	
2021	Mr Inbetween	Killian	1 episode	
2024	Plum	Bobby D	3 episodes	
