= Jucy (film) =

- Australian film poster
- Directed by: Louise Alston
- Screenplay by: Stephen Vagg
- Story by: Louise Alston
- Based on: Characters by Francesca Gasteen; Cindy Nelson
- Produced by: Kelly Chapman
- Starring: Francesca Gasteen; Cindy Nelson; Ryan Johnson; Damien Freeleagus; Nelle Lee; Andrew Ryan; Charlotte Gregg
- Cinematography: Jan Reichle
- Edited by: Andrew Soo
- Music by: Caitlin Yeo
- Production companies: KCDC; Bunker Productions International; Screen Queensland
- Distributed by: Odin's Eye Entertainment
- Release dates: 13 September 2010 (Toronto International Film Festival); 3 November 2011 (Australia)
- Running time: 90 minutes
- Country: Australia
- Language: English
- Budget: A$500,000

Jucy is an Australian comedy feature film produced in 2010 about the womance between two best female friends. The film was written by Stephen Vagg, directed by Louise Alston and produced by Kelly Chapman. It is the second in a "quarter life crisis" trilogy from Vagg and Alston following the 2007 romantic comedy All My Friends Are Leaving Brisbane, that concluded with the 2026 film All My Friends Are Back in Brisbane.

== Synopsis ==
Jucy is a "womantic" comedy about best friends Jackie (Cindy Nelson) and Lucy (Francesca Gasteen). They're in their mid twenties but not much has changed since high school. Jackie's social anxiety is still not under control and she remains incapable of a mature relationship with a man; Lucy hasn't finished either of the university degrees she started and still lives with her mother.

When the duo's relationship is attacked, they make a pact to show the world just how normal they are: Jackie decides to get a boyfriend and Lucy aims for a career move.

They get a chance to complete their goal when both are cast in a stage adaptation of the Charlotte Brontë novel Jane Eyre. Jackie has her eye on the show's star, Alex (Ryan Johnson), and Lucy is determined to become a professional actor to win acceptance from her sister Fleur (Nelle Lee). However it results in stress being put on their friendship, which is pushed to breaking point.

== Cast ==
- Francesca Gasteen as Lucy
- Cindy Nelson as Jackie
- Ryan Johnson as Alex
- Nelle Lee as Fleur
- Damien Freeleagus as Trevor
- Andrew Ryan as Brett
- Charlotte Gregg as Dimity
- Sally McKenzie as Ros
- Christopher Sommers as Nate

== Production ==
The movie came out of Louise Alston's experiences working with Francesca Gasteen and Cindy Nelson in various plays and on the 2007 feature All My Friends Are Leaving Brisbane. She wrote the first draft of the script which was developed by writer Stephen Vagg, with further input from producer Kelly Chapman.

The film was shot in Brisbane and the Gold Coast, in the suburbs of West End, The Gap, Paddington, New Farm and Ephraim Island. Iconic Brisbane video store Trash Video is also featured.

Charlotte Gregg, who played the lead in All My Friends Are Leaving Brisbane, plays a support role as Dimity, a bitchy actor who torments the lead characters.

== Reception ==
The film had its world premiere at the 2010 Toronto International Film Festival where the critic from Variety acclaimed the film as "colorfully stylized, sweet and silly" and the leads as "terrific". It was subsequently screened at the Seattle International Film Festival, Brisbane International Film Festival, Gold Coast Film Festival, London Australia Film Festival, Scottsdale International Film Festival and International Women's Film Festival in Seoul.

Jucy was released to cinemas in Australia on 3 November 2011, starting with Canberra, Adelaide, Brisbane, Wagga Wagga and Orange. Louise Keller at Urban Cinefile called the film "bright and bubbly... there's vibrancy about the two lead performances - both girls are exceptionally good, and we genuinely care about their characters. The film is short and sweet with a good heart." Matthew Toomey of ABC Radio Brisbane said the movie "has a great sense of humour (some jokes left me laughing out loud) and explores a number of issues which Gen Y folk will be able to relate."
