= Primal (2010 film) =

- Theatrical release poster
- Directed by: Josh Reed
- Written by: Nigel Christensen; Josh Reed
- Produced by: Nigel Christensen; John Cordukes; James Crawford; Rob Gibson; Josh Reed
- Starring: Zoe Tuckwell-Smith; Krew Boylan; Lindsay Farris; Rebekah Foord; Damien Freeleagus; Wil Traval
- Cinematography: John Biggins
- Edited by: Josh Reed
- Music by: Rob Gibson
- Release date: 23 September 2010 (United States)
- Running time: 80 minutes
- Country: Australia
- Language: English

Primal is a 2010 Australian horror film directed by Josh Reed, and starring Zoe Tuckwell-Smith, Krew Boylan, Lindsay Farris, and Wil Traval.

== Premise ==
A group of friends—Anja, Mel, Dace, Chad, Kris, and Warren—embark on a journey into the Australian outback where Dace, an anthropology student, aims to study ancient symbols outside a mysterious cave. They are soon attacked by a bizarre, aggressive rabbit with sharp teeth, which injures Kris before the group manages to kill it. Bewildered, they return to their camp.

Later that evening, Mel goes skinny-dipping in a local pond but is attacked by leeches. That night, she develops a high fever, starts losing her teeth, and suffers from uncontrollable bleeding. The following day, Mel, now a mutant with knife-like teeth, superhuman strength, and a savage hunger for flesh, turns on her friends. Despite their efforts to subdue her, she escapes, killing and consuming Warren.

In a bid to escape Mel, Dace hides in the pond, but Anja, Kris, and Chad manage to pull him out. Believing that the leeches carry the parasite responsible for Mel’s transformation and finding no leeches on Dace, they assume he is safe.

That night, as the survivors plan their escape, Dace shows symptoms similar to Mel’s before her mutation. The friends debate whether to kill Dace before he transforms. Meanwhile, sensing Dace's impending transformation and seeking a potential mate, mutant Mel attacks the survivors, saving and hiding Dace to ensure he transforms safely.

Despite their efforts, Mel succeeds in protecting Dace due to Chad’s denial of Mel’s death and his disbelief that only the parasite remains. The mutated, brainless Dace then chases Kris. Eventually, the fully transformed mutants, Dace and Mel, meet and sacrifice Kris to the cave. Anja realizes that the mutants fear the cave for some unknown reason and plans an escape route through it.

As Anja and Chad attempt to escape through the cave while the mutants feast on Warren’s remains, their plan falls apart when mutant Dace and Mel begin to mate. Chad, overwhelmed with jealousy and anger, attacks the mutants, leading to a battle in which both mutant Dace and Chad are killed. Anja flees into the cave, where she discovers Kris, who has been impregnated by a monster—likely the source of the parasites in the pond. Kris ends the pregnancy by slicing open her own stomach to remove the "child," and Anja kills the monster itself after it crushes Kris.

In the morning, Anja encounters the mutant Mel one final time. During their confrontation, Anja paralyzes Mel by kicking her into a tree and breaking her spine. She then finishes Mel off by dropping a large rock on her head, crushing her skull.

== Cast ==
- Zoe Tuckwell-Smith as Anja
- Krew Boylan as Mel
- Lindsay Farris as Chad
- Rebekah Foord as Kris
- Damien Freeleagus as Warren
- Wil Traval as Dace
- Mark Saunders as Painter (as Alfred Coolwell)
- Walangari Karntawarra Jakamarra as Monster
- Stephen Shanahan as Settler
- Ch'aska Cuba de Reed as Settler's Daughter
- Santiago Cuba de Reed as Settler's Son

== Reception ==
Primal received positive reviews from critics, earning a 75% approval rating on Rotten Tomatoes based on eight reviews, with a weighted average score of 6.1/10.
