= Rock Island Mysteries =

Australian teen comedy drama television series

- Also known as: Taylor's Island
- Genre: Comedy; Teen drama; Mystery
- Created by: Matthew Cooke; Vincent Lund; Michael Ford
- Developed by: Charly Valentine
- Screenplay by: Stephen Vagg
- Directed by: Tenika Smith; Evan Clarry; Jovita O’Shaughnessy; Grant Brown
- Starring: Alexa Curtis; Noah Akhigbe; Inessa Tan; Ryan Yeates; Izellah Connelly
- Theme music composer: Michael Tan; Brett Creswell
- Opening theme: Rock Island Mysteries theme performed by Christina Castle
- Composers: Richard Pleasance; Amanda Brown; Michael Tan; Anthony Cormican; Ack Kinmonth; Wes Larsen; Caitlin Yeo; Dmitri Golovko
- Country of origin: Australia
- Original language: English
- No. of seasons: 3
- No. of episodes: 60

Production
- Executive producers: Chris Oliver-Taylor; Warren Clarke; Chris Rose; Matthew Cooke; Vincent Lund; Michael Ford; Hugh Baldwin; Brett Popplewell
- Producers: Timothy Powell; Jonah Klein; Kelly Son Hing; Kieran Hoyle
- Cinematography: Andrew Conder
- Camera setup: Multi-camera
- Running time: 22 minutes
- Production company: FremantleMedia Australia

Original release
- Network: Nickelodeon (previously 10 Shake); Nickelodeon Channel
- Release: 2 May 2022 – 22 December 2024

Rock Island Mysteries is an Australian comedy television show for children and young teenagers, which premiered on Nickelodeon (then named 10 Shake) on 2 May 2022 and the pay-television Nickelodeon channel on the following day. It follows the adventures of Taylor's group of friends, who explore Rock Island.

== Production ==
The twenty-part series was filmed on the Gold Coast and Port Douglas, Queensland in 2021 for season 1, and on the Gold Coast and in Helensvale, Queensland from 2022–2023 for season 2. It was a FremantleMedia Australia production for Network 10 and Nickelodeon International. The series was initially titled Taylor's Island during production.

The series was created by Matthew Cooke, Vincent Lund and Michael Ford. It was written by script producer Stephen Vagg, with writers Sam Carroll, Alix Beane, David Hannam, Marisa Nathar, Natesha Somasundaram, Trent Roberts, Jessica Brookman and Hannah Samuel.

In October 2022, Network 10 and Nickelodeon announced the show had been renewed for a second season, which premiered on 25 September 2023. The series premiered on 25 September 2023 on Nickelodeon.

On 6 May 2024, the series was renewed for a third season, which premiered on 23 November 2024. The series is also available to stream on Paramount+ in Australia, with episodes released following the season's airing. Lila also is moved up to the main protagonist of Season 3 as Taylor is absent for most the season.

== Cast ==
- Alexa Curtis as Taylor Young
- Noah Akhigbe as Nori Harlow
- Inessa Tan as Meesha Rai
- Ryan Yeates as Ellis Grouch
- Izellah Connelly as Lila Gray, Taylor's step-sister
- Kimberley Joseph as Emily Young, Taylor's mother
- Craig Horner as Sunny Gray, Taylor's step-father
- Monette Lee as Gillian Rai
- Annabelle Stephenson as Raquel Newman
- Lucas Linehan as Uncle Charlie
- Ian McFadyen as Old Faraz

== Episodes ==
Series	Episodes	Originally released	
Series	Episodes	First released	Last released
1	20	2 May 2022	27 May 2022
2	20	25 September 2023	25 October 2023
3	20	23 November 2024	22 December 2024

=== Series 1 (2022) ===
No. overall	No. in series	Title	Directed by	Written by	Original release date
1	1	"Happy Birthday, Taylor!"	Tenika Smith	Alix Beane	2 May 2022
2	2	"Bermuda Queen"	Tenika Smith	Sam Carroll	3 May 2022
3	3	"Something in the Water"	Evan Clarry	Alix Beane	4 May 2022
4	4	"Who's That Girl"	Evan Clarry	David Hannam	5 May 2022
5	5	"Distress Call"	Tenika Smith	Alix Beane	6 May 2022
6	6	"A Tale of Two Taylors"	Jovita O’Shaughnessy	Trent Roberts	9 May 2022
7	7	"The Shadow"	Jovita O’Shaughnessy	Natesha Somasundaram & Jessica Brookman	10 May 2022
8	8	"Hurricane Jonah"	Tenika Smith	Trent Roberts	11 May 2022
9	9	"Text Message in a Bottle"	Tenika Smith	David Hannam	12 May 2022
10	10	"Sea Shell"	Tenika Smith	Jessica Brookman	13 May 2022
11	11	"Treasure Map"	Tenika Smith	Hannah Samuel	16 May 2022
12	12	"Taylor's Dream"	Jovita O'Shaughnessy	Sam Carroll	17 May 2022
13	13	"A Date with Atlantis"	Evan Clarry	Alix Beane	18 May 2022
14	14	"Mystery of the Forgotten Mystery"	Jovita O'Shaughnessy	Alix Beane	19 May 2022
15	15	"A Young Mystery"	Jovita O'Shaughnessy	Marisa Nathar	20 May 2022
16	16	"Day of the Octopus"	Tenika Smith	Marisa Nathar	23 May 2022
17	17	"Pong Plant"	Evan Clarry	Marisa Nathar	24 May 2022
18	18	"Brain Swap"	Tenika Smith	Trent Roberts	25 May 2022
19	19	"Lights in the Sky"	Evan Clarry	Natesha Somasundaram	26 May 2022
20	20	"The Mystery of Raquel"	Tenika Smith	Jessica Brookman	27 May 2022

=== Series 2 (2023) ===
No. overall	No. in series	Title	Directed by	Written by	Original release date
21	1	"The Cave to Everywhere, Part One"	Evan Clarry	Alix Beane	25 September 2023
22	2	"The Cave to Everywhere, Part Two"	Evan Clarry	Alix Beane	25 September 2023
23	3	"The Message"	Jovita O'Shaughnessy	Jessica Brookman	26 September 2023
24	4	"A Photo from the Past"	Jovita O'Shaughnessy	Jessica Brookman	27 September 2023
25	5	"Something Else in the Water"	Jovita O'Shaughnessy	Marisa Nathar	28 September 2023
26	6	"Dream A Little Dream"	Jovita O'Shaughnessy	Trent Roberts	2 October 2023
27	7	"Lucky Charm"	Jovita O'Shaughnessy	Matthew Bon	3 October 2023
28	8	"New Friends"	Grant Brown	Trent Roberts	4 October 2023
29	9	"The Dig"	Grant Brown	Trent Roberts	5 October 2023
30	10	"The Day Uncle Charlie Went Missing"	Grant Brown	Chloe Wong	9 October 2023
31	11	"Return to the Hidden Valley"	Grant Brown	Rachel Laverty	10 October 2023
32	12	"Secrets in the Ice"	Grant Brown	Dave Cartel	11 October 2023
33	13	"Mystery Hunter"	Evan Clarry	Jessica Brookman	12 October 2023
34	14	"Frozen in Time"	Jovita O'Shaughnessy	Marisa Nathar	16 October 2023
35	15	"Runaway Groom"	Jovita O'Shaughnessy	Dave Cartel	17 October 2023
36	16	"The Two Charlies"	Jovita O'Shaughnessy	Rachel Laverty	18 October 2023
37	17	"Journey to the Bottom of the Island"	Jovita O'Shaughnessy	Matthew Bon	19 October 2023
38	18	"Too Much Information"	Evan Clarry	Trent Roberts	23 October 2023
39	19	"This Is Not a Drill"	Evan Clarry	Alix Beane	24 October 2023
40	20	"The Energy Source"	Evan Clarry	Jessica Brookman	25 October 2023

=== Series 3 (2024) ===
No. overall	No. in series	Title	Directed by	Written by	Original release date
41	1	"Welcome Back Taylor"	Evan Clarry	Alix Beane	23 November 2024
42	2	"An Echo Must Return"	Craig Irvin	Rachel Laverty	23 November 2024
43	3	"The Hidden Crypt"	Craig Irvin	Rachel Laverty	24 November 2024
44	4	"Solstice Stone"	Craig Irvin	Marisa Nathar	24 November 2024
45	5	"The Portrait"	Harry Lloyd	Trent Roberts	30 November 2024
46	6	"Opposites Attract"	Harry Lloyd	Gemma Bird Matheson	30 November 2024
47	7	"Artificial Taylor"	Harry Lloyd	Nicky Arnall	1 December 2024
48	8	"Sleepwalker"	Harry Lloyd	Matthew Bon	1 December 2024
49	9	"Lila's Listeners"	Leticia Cáceres	Marisa Nathar	7 December 2024
50	10	"The Truth Below"	Harry Lloyd	Alix Beane	7 December 2024
51	11	"Ellis vs. Ellis"	Leticia Cáceres	Trent Roberts	8 December 2024
52	12	"It's Electric"	Evan Clarry	Nicky Arnall	8 December 2024
53	13	"Who's Who"	Evan Clarry	Matthew Bon	14 December 2024
54	14	"Tiny Troubles"	Leticia Cáceres	Rachel Laverty	14 December 2024
55	15	"Crystallised"	Evan Clarry	Trent Roberts	15 December 2024
56	16	"Reflections"	Leticia Cáceres	Holly Alexander	15 December 2024
57	17	"To Catch a Ghost"	Evan Clarry	Matthew Bon	21 December 2024
58	18	"The Weeping Tree"	Leticia Cáceres	Holly Alexander	21 December 2024
59	19	"Homecoming, Part One"	Evan Clarry	Alix Beane	22 December 2024
60	20	"Homecoming, Part Two: That Sinking Feeling"	Evan Clarry	Alix Beane	22 December 2024

== Awards ==
=== TV Week Logie Awards ===
Year	Nominee / work	Award	Result
2025	Rock Island Mysteries	Best Children's Program	Nominated
