= Freeleagus =

Freeleagus is a surname. Notable people with the surname include:

- Alex Freeleagus (1928–2005), Australian lawyer
- Damien Freeleagus, Australian actor
