= Clayton Watson =

Australian producer, actor, writer, and director

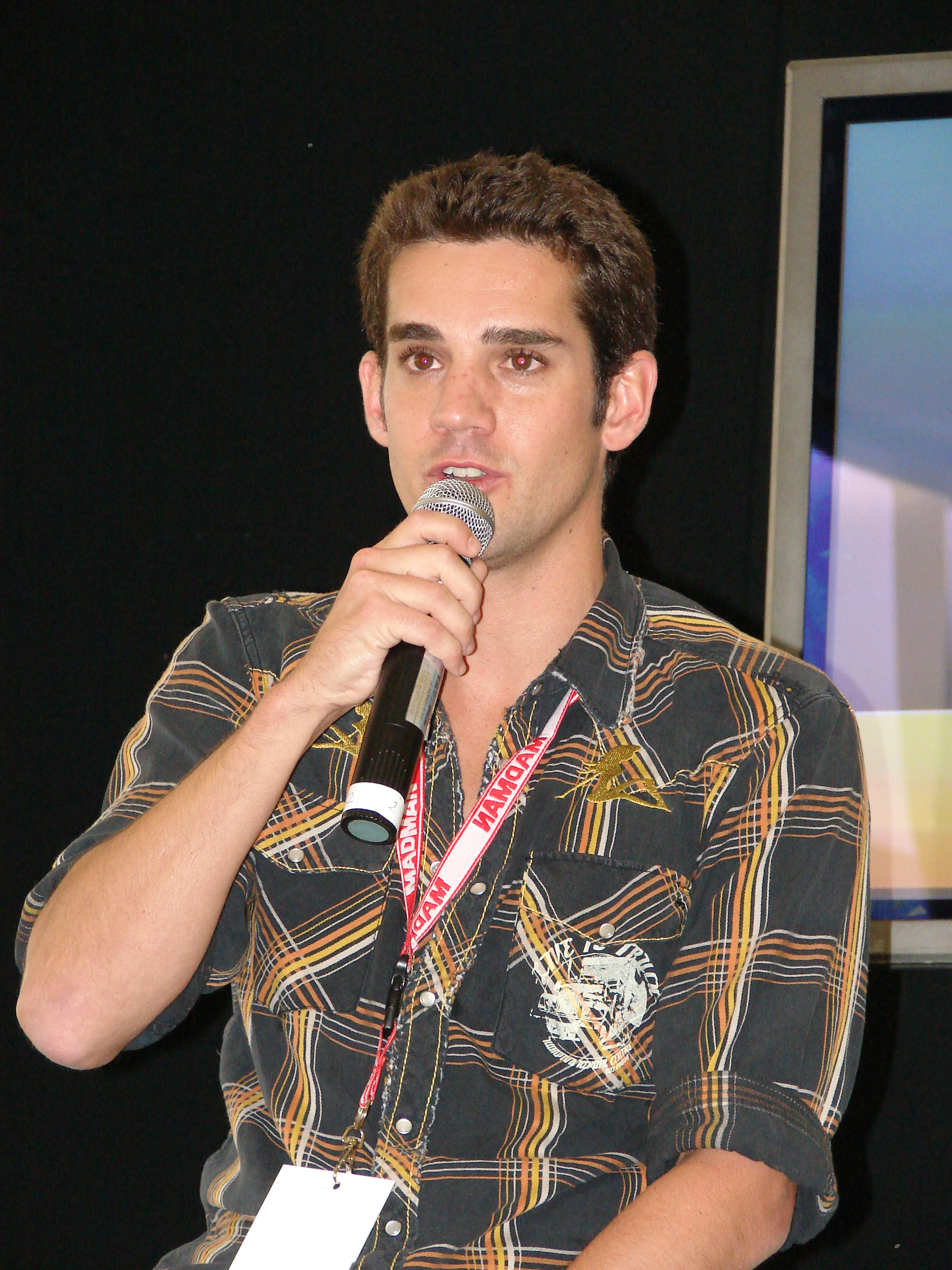
- Watson at the Supanova convention in Brisbane, 2007
- Born: 23 March 1977 (age 49); Sydney, New South Wales, Australia
- Education: Pembroke School; Australian Film and Television Academy
- Occupations: Actor, writer, director, producer
- Years active: 1998–present
- Known for: The Matrix film franchise Always Greener; Out of the Blue
- Spouse: Renai Caruso
- Children: 2

Clayton Watson (born 23 March 1977) is an Australian producer, actor, writer, and director, best known for his breakthrough role as Kid in the films of The Matrix.

== Early life ==
Watson was raised on a rural South Australian sheep station. He attended the high school at Pembroke School in Adelaide.

Watson first began performing at the age of twelve, but decided to pursue it as a career when he turned 16. Upon graduating from high school, and at this stage living on the Gold Coast, he went on to study at the Australian Film and Television Academy (AFTRS) in Queensland.

When his mother and stepfather started a blues and jazz club, Watson managed the venue for 18 months, before moving to Melbourne where he began landing acting work.

== Career ==
Watson landed roles in stage productions of West Side Story and Swan Lake. In 1998, he appeared in the miniseries The Day of the Roses, which told the story of the Granville rail disaster. In 1999, he secured his first lead role as Luke in children's television series High Flyers. The series, about a children's circus, saw Watson train with The Flying Fruit Fly Circus, where he learned to walk the high wire, juggle and do acrobatics.

Watson then appeared in television guest roles, in series including Pacific Drive, Blue Heelers and Flipper, while taking jobs delivering pizzas and bartending between acting roles, to financially support himself, before winning the lead role of sixteen year old army brat Mickey Steele in drama series Always Greener. His portrayal earned him an Australian Film Institute Award.

On breaks during the series, Watson pursued film work, which saw him land his breakthrough role playing The Kid (one of the last survivors of the human race), next to Keanu Reeves, Laurence Fishburne, and Carrie-Anne Moss in The Matrix Reloaded, The Matrix Revolutions, and Kid's Story, a short film segment in 2003 anthology anime film The Animatrix. The following year, he appeared alongside Nathan Phillips and Gyton Grantley in Australian comedy film Under the Radar, before reprising his role as The Kid for the video game The Matrix Online in 2005. His role in the franchise saw him nominated for Best Newcomer at the American Sci-Fi Awards.

Following the completion of filming The Matrix, Watson landed two agents and moved to Los Angeles, where he undertook auditions for several years, alongside the likes of Tom Hardy, Orlando Bloom and Elijah Wood. He auditioned for J. J. Abrams, Bernardo Bertolucci and Spike Lee, the latter of whom he sang for, in trying out for the film adaptation of the stage musical Rent. He came close to landing film roles, but ultimately returned to Australia.

In 2008, Watson played the lead role of nursery and landscaping business owner/operator Jarrod O'Donnell in BBC drama series Out of the Blue, alongside Zoe Carides and Ryan Johnson. That same year, he appeared in supernatural horror film Credo (also known as The Devil's Curse) and had a role opposite Matthew Newton in comedy drama film Three Blind Mice. He also founded CW Productions in 2008.

In 2009, Watson began a recurring guest role on Home and Away as Grant Bledcoe, Ruby Buckton's (Rebecca Breeds) biological father with a sordid past. He also played the romantic lead, Jimmy Koutella in 2009 feature I Wish I Were Stephanie V. In 2010, he worked alongside Guy Pearce and Claudia Karvan in drama feature 33 Postcards.

In 2012, Watson played the lead character of David in Stephen King film Willa, as well as portraying Australian cricketer Ian Chappell in drama miniseries Howzat! Kerry Packer's War. In November 2013, he began appearing in a recurring role as widowed single father Jacob Holmes in long-running soap opera Neighbours. He also had a guest role in Mr & Mrs Murder, alongside Shaun Micallef and Kat Stewart the same year.

In 2018, Watson directed his first feature in New York, Michael Wardeath, also playing the title character, which is yet to be released. He then wrote, produced, and directed the 2020 short film Deadly Flat, in which he also starred, with Renai Caruso.

More recently, Watson has appeared in crime film The Cost (2022) playing Brian, suspense film Kane (2023) playing Benny and shark action horror Fear Below (2025), in the role of Bob Drummond.

== Personal life ==
Watson met his wife, actress Renai Caruso on an acting job in Sydney, before he moved with her to Melbourne after she landed an acting gig there. Together they have two children.

The couple moved to Daylesford in Victoria's Macedon Ranges, where Watson began studying to become a sommelier and subsequently opened Daylesford Wine Tours in 2011. He sold the business in 2023, and the couple have since relocated to the Sunshine Coast in Queensland.

== Filmography ==
=== Film ===
Year	Title	Role	Notes	Ref.
1998	Nick: A Teen Romance	Nock	Short film	
2003	The Matrix Reloaded	Kid	Feature film	
2003	The Matrix Revolutions	Kid	Feature film	
2003	The Animatrix	Kid	Anthology film	
2003	Image is Everything	Joey	Short film	
2004	Under the Radar	Adrian	Feature film	
2005	In the Middle	Brendan	Short film	
2008	Three Blind Mice	Vito	Feature film	
2008	Credo	Jock	Feature film	
2009	I Wish I Were Stephanie V	Jimmy Koutella	Feature film	
2010	33 Postcards	Brian	Feature film	
2010	Oranges and Sunshine	CM (voice – uncredited)	Feature film	
2010	Drawn to Life	Nick	Short film	
2012	Willa	David Sanderson	Feature film	
2013	Absolutely Modern	Sidney Nolan	Feature film	
2018	Shooter	Craig	Short film	
2019	The Tree Artist	Jacquez Monet	Short film	
2020	Deadly Flat	Rider	Short film	
2020	Social Distancing (aka Corona Virus)	Clay Rivers		
2022	The Cost	Brian	Feature film	
2023	Kane	Benny	Feature film	
2025	Fear Below	Bob Drummond	Feature film	
TBA	Walking Red Flag	Field Reporter	Feature film	
TBA	Michael Wardeath	Michael Wardeath	Feature film – Completed	
TBA	The Guns of Muschu	Quartermaster Hannagan	In development	
TBA	True Divide	Tristan Dorchester	In development	
TBA	Trout	Michael	In development	
TBA	The Terraces	Mark Rutherford	In development	
TBA	The Fermi-Paradox	Jack Combes	In development	
TBA	The Drug Soldiers of Atlantis	Drivis Cleese	In development	
TBA	The Bridge	Sam Cruise	In development	
TBA	The Bat Detective	Benny	In development	
TBA	Space D.J.	Bradley Star	In development	
TBA	Safe Society	Yann	In development	
TBA	Neon Jungle	Buster Brown	In development	
TBA	Fishing a Rednecks Tale	Buck	In development	
TBA	Cully	David 'DC' Constable	In development	
TBA	Cinphoney	TBA	In development	
TBA	BlackJack	Liam	In development	

=== Television ===
Year	Title	Role	Notes	Ref.
1996–2001	Blue Heelers	Brendan Harmer / Greg / Heath Jamieson	3 episodes	
1998	The Day of the Roses	Dr Sommers	Miniseries	
1998	Gargantua	G.I. Wimberley	TV movie	
1998	Flipper	Fraizer's Henchman (uncredited)	1 episode	
1998	Casino Reef		TV movie	
1999	High Flyers	Luke	26 episodes	
2000	Eugenie Sandler P.I.	Joska	2 episodes	
2001–2003	Always Greener	Mickey Steele	50 episodes	
2008	Out of the Blue	Jarrod O'Donnell	86 episodes	
2009	Home and Away	Grant Bledcoe	8 episodes	
2010	Sea Patrol	Fraser	1 episode	
2012	Australia on Trial	Matthew Doran	Miniseries, 1 episode	
2012	Howzat! Kerry Packer's War	Ian Chappell	Miniseries, 2 episodes	
2013	Mr & Mrs Murder	Bruce	Miniseries, 1 episode	
2013	Twentysomething	Chris	1 episode	
2013–2014	Neighbours	Jacob Holmes	14 episodes	
2014	House Husbands	Charlie Cole	1 episode	
2021	Young Rock	Calgary Man	1 episode	

=== Video game ===
Year	Title	Role	Notes	Ref.
2005	The Matrix Online	Kid	Video game	

== Writer / director / producer credits ==
=== Film ===
Year	Title	Role	Notes	Ref.
2019	The Tree Artist	Writer / director / producer / executive producer	Short film	
2020	Deadly Flat	Director / producer / cinematographer	Short film	
2020	Social Distancing (aka Coronavirus)	Writer / director / producer	Feature film	
2026	Walking Red Flag	Producer	Feature film	
TBA	Imperial Fox	Writer / director / producer / editor	Documentary short	
TBA	Michael Wardeath	Writer / co-director / producer	Feature film – Completed	
TBA	Starting Blocks	Director	Feature film	
TBA	True Divide	Writer / director / producer	In development	
TBA	Trout	Writer / director / producer	Feature film – in development	
TBA	The Terraces	Writer / director / producer	Feature film – in development	
TBA	The Fermi-Paradox	Writer / director / producer	Feature film – in development	
TBA	The Bridge	Writer / director producer	Feature film – in development	
TBA	The Drug Soldiers of Atlantis	Writer / director	Feature film – in development	
TBA	Space DJ	Writer / producer	Feature film – in development	
TBA	The Bat Detective	Writer	In development	
TBA	Safe Society	Producer	Feature film – in development	
TBA	Fishing a Rednecks Tale	Writer / executive producer	In development	
TBA	Cully	Producer	Feature film – in development	

=== Television ===
Year	Title	Role	Notes	Ref.
2025	Killing Donnie (aka Sugar Coated Cocaine)	Producer		
TBA	Bondi Baby	Producer	TV movie – In development	
TBA	Dangers of an Imperfect Mind	Producer	TV movie – In development	

== Awards ==
Year	Work	Award	Category	Result	Ref.
	The Matrix	American Sci-Fi Awards	Best Newcomer	Won	
2002	Always Greener	Australian Film Institute Television Awards	Best Actor in a Supporting or Guest Role in a Television Drama	Won	
