= Louise Alston =

Australian film director

Louise Alston is an Australian film director and producer best known for the movies All My Friends Are Leaving Brisbane and Jucy.

== Biography ==
Alston was born in Wagga Wagga, and studied at the Australian Film, Television and Radio School after which she created and produced two television series, The Variety Show at the End of the World and Brilliant Lives. She made her debut as feature film director with the romantic comedy All My Friends Are Leaving Brisbane which was released to Australian cinemas in 2007.

Her follow-up feature, the comedy Jucy, had its international debut at the Toronto International Film Festival in 2010.

She has lectured at the Australian Film Television and Radio School, and has directed episodes of Neighbours.

In 2018 she commenced production on her third feature as director, Back of the Net.

In September 2019, Alston will be directing a film adaption of "The Will" by Kristen Ashley for Passionflix.

== Filmography ==
=== Feature films ===
- All My Friends Are Leaving Brisbane (2007) (director, producer)
- Jucy (2010) (director, story, executive producer)
- Back of the Net (2019) (director)
- The Will (2020)
- Resisting Roots (2022) (director)
- In Her Likeness (2024) (director)
- Lick (2024) (director)
- Housemaid (2026) (director)
- All My Friends Are Back in Brisbane (2026)

=== TV ===
- Variety Show at the End of the World (2000) (co-producer, creator)
- Brilliant Lives (2002) (co-producer/creator)
- Neighbours (2013) (director)
- Dressed for Love (2023, Television film) (director)
- Three Dates to Forever (2023, Television film) (director)
- He Had Seven Wives (2024, Television film) (director)

=== Short films ===
- Beige Brown (2005) (director)
- Humidity Rising (2006) (director)
- Help (2007) (director)
- Photocopier (2013) (director)

=== Theatre ===
- "Sidekicks" Old 505 Theatre 2012, Adelaide Fringe Festival 2013, Melbourne International Comedy Festival 2013 (director)
