= Stephen Vagg =

Australian writer

Stephen Vagg is an Australian writer. He wrote the films All My Friends Are Leaving Brisbane, based on his play, and Jucy, as well as a number of plays and episodes of the television soaps Home and Away and Neighbours. He is the author of Rod Taylor: An Aussie in Hollywood, a biography of actor Rod Taylor, as well as a number of articles on film and theatre history. He received an AFI nomination for All My Friends Are Leaving Brisbane. At the 2014 AWGIE Awards, Vagg won Best Script for a Television Serial for "Episode 6857" of Neighbours.

== Selected credits ==
=== Films ===
- All My Friends Are Leaving Brisbane (2007) – writer, associate producer, actor
- Jucy (2010) – writer, executive producer
- All My Friends Are Back in Brisbane (2026) - writer, producer

=== Television ===
- McLeod's Daughters (2001) – researcher
- Young Lions (2001) – trainee script editor
- Out of the Blue (2008) – writer, script associate
- Home and Away (2009–13) – core writer, script editor, associate script producer
- Howzat! Kerry Packer's War (2012) – researcher
- Neighbours – writer, supervising script editor, story producer, script editor
- Rock Island Mysteries - story producer (season one and two)
- Darby and Joan - writer

=== Plays ===
- All My Friends Are Leaving Brisbane
- Dirty Caff
- Friday Night Drinks
- Nerd Formal
- Rebel Tour
- Trivia
- Love Song Dedications
- Tom and Nicole and Russell and Friends
- Sidekicks

=== Books ===
- The Quarter Life Crisis: A Collection of Plays (2006) – plays – writer
- Rod Taylor: An Aussie in Hollywood (2010) – book – writer
