= Jan Reichle =

Australian cinematographer

Jan Reichle is an Australian cinematographer whose credits include the feature film Jucy (2010). He studied at Victorian College of the Arts School of Film and Television.
