= Breakers (TV series) =

1998–1999 Australian TV series

- Title screen for 1999
- Genre: Soap opera Drama
- Created by: Jimmy Thomson
- Opening theme: Mike Perjanik
- Composer: John Ertler
- Country of origin: Australia
- No. of seasons: 2
- No. of episodes: 430

Production
- Executive producer: Des Monaghan
- Running time: 25 mins
- Production company: Screentime

Original release
- Network: Network Ten
- Release: 2 February 1998 – 3 November 1999

Breakers is an Australian television series that aired on Network Ten from 2 February 1998 to 3 November 1999, producing 430 episodes.

== Synopsis ==
The series revolves around the Breakers building situated near Bondi Beach, and the lives of the people who work and live there. The building houses three businesses, BMS (Breaker's Modelling School), a modelling agency run by Paul Simmons, The Breaker, a local newspaper run by Eve, Paul's ex-wife, and Kate's Café, run by Kate Markham, Eve's sister, along with a drop-in centre for homeless teenagers, Against The Tide, run by Steve Giordano.

== Cast ==
=== Main characters ===
Original cast members

- James Stewart as Alex Markham, Kate's 19-year-old rebellious son (1998–99)
- Helen O'Connor as Kate Markham, 34-year-old café owner
- Ling-Hsueh Tang as Maggie Lee, works at The Breaker (1998–99)
- Julie Haseler as Eve Simmons, Kate's sister, 37-year-old publisher and editor of The Breaker
- Simone Robertson as Monique Fairbairn, 24-year-old co-owner of BMS
- Richard Healy as Paul Simmons, Eve's ex-husband, co-owner of BMS
- Ben Tate as Danny Simmons, Eve and Paul's 14-year-old son
- Simon Munro as Vince Donnelly, Danny's best friend, 15-year-old gay model
- Louise Crawford as Lucy Hill, Alex's 19-year-old ex-girlfriend, works at The Breaker
- Miranda Chance as Jaime Esber, Lucy's best friend and flatmate (1998)
- Heath Bergersen as Reuben Neeson, 16-year-old Aboriginal street kid
- Jean-Marc Russ as Boris McCann, 29-year-old chef at the café
- John Atkinson as Steve Giordano, 28-year-old manager of the drop-in centre
- Emily Perry as Terri Simmons, Eve and Paul's 16-year-old daughter
- Jason Crewes as Serge Prejean, French-Canadian who dates Nina (1998)
- Christen Cornell as Nina Ordish (1998)

Later additions

- Angela Keep as Cheree Walker, Reuben's friend, a street kid who discovers she has HIV (1998–99)
- Amber Virtue as Felicity, Vince's love interest before he realises he is gay (1998)
- Ada Nicodemou as Fiona Motson, Nina's rival from Muswellbrook, 17-year-old waitress at the café (1998–99)
- Preben Warren as Jack McCann, Boris' younger brother, Terri's love interest (1998–99)
- Melinda Kennings as Xanthe Fairbairn, Monique's younger sister (1999)
- Don Hany as Alex Markham #2 (1999)

=== Recurring characters ===
- Paula Duncan as Karen Fairbarn, Monique's mother
- Anja Coleby as Crystal, Paul's love interest
- Megan Connolly as Lily, Steve's love interest
- Vincent Atkinson as Peter Hirsch, Vince's love interest
- Gabriella Maselli as Kelly, Terri's tutor, who becomes involved with Lucy
- Tirana Hassan as India, who becomes involved with Alex
- Jessica Hill as Sam, terminally ill girl involved with Danny
- Adrian Jarrett as Stuart, who is revealed in show's cliffhanger as Cheree's stalker
- Beau Brady as Joey
- Kieran Darcy-Smith as Slim

== Controversy ==
Australian Senator Karen Synon considered the depiction of Lucy Hill, in a lesbian relationship to be "inappropriate" given the program's afternoon timeslot, and requested the Australian Broadcasting Authority investigate if the show had breached broadcasting guidelines. The ABA told The Daily Telegraph that the storyline was "normal" and the show's PG rating was appropriate for the timeslot.
