= Seconds to Spare =

- Genre: Action; Adventure; Thriller
- Written by: Dennis A. Pratt; Brian Trenchard-Smith
- Directed by: Brian Trenchard-Smith
- Starring: Antonio Sabato Jr; Kimberley Davies; Kate Beahan; Nick Tate; Charlotte Gregg
- Music by: Guy Gross
- Countries of origin: United States; Australia
- Original language: English

Production
- Executive producers: Stephen Davis; Gary Goldberger; Marc B. Lorber; Kris Noble
- Producer: Matt Carroll
- Cinematography: John Stokes
- Editor: Simon Klaebe
- Running time: 90 minutes
- Production companies: Nine Film and Television; Carlton America

Original release
- Network: Nine Network
- Release: 1 May 2002

Seconds to Spare, also known as Operation Wolverine: Seconds to Spare, is a 2002 thriller about a hijacked train. Directed by Brian Trenchard-Smith, it was shot in Australia and stars Antonio Sabato Jr, Kimberley Davies, Kate Beahan, Nick Tate, and Charlotte Gregg.

== Cast ==
- Antonio Sabato Jr as Paul Blake
- Kimberley Davies as Rhonda Newcombe
- Kate Beahan as Eve Lambert
- Nick Tate as Commander Haggarty
- Charlotte Gregg as Beatrice
- Alyssa-Jane Cook as Kristin
- Jerome Ehlers as Emmett Larkin
