= Nelle Lee =

Australian actress, producer and writer

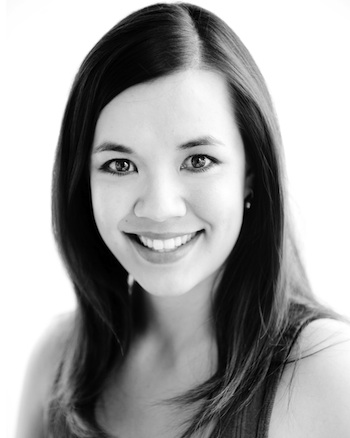
- Nelle Lee in 2011
- Occupations: Actor, scriptwriter

Nelle Lee is a Brisbane-based actress, producer and writer best known for theatre work.

She is also artistic director of independent theatre company, Shake and Stir.

== Early life and education ==
Lee attended school at Albany Creek in Brisbane. She went on to studied at the University of Southern Queensland, graduating from the Theatre program with a major in Acting in 2004. She was awarded the 2011 Young Alumnus of the Year Award and Faculty of Arts Prize in a special ceremony.

== Career ==
=== Theatre ===
Lee toured Queensland and Victoria with Newton's Law. After three seasons, she went on to perform with a variety of theatre companies, including the Queensland Theatre Company and Strut 'n' Fret / Queensland Arts Council.

In 2006, Lee joined with Ross Balbuziente and Nick Skubij to form the theatre company Shake and Stir, each serving as Artistic Directors. The company's productions have been nominated for several Helpmann Awards, Matilda Awards and APACA’S Drover Award for Tour of the Year. In addition to their major productions, they run master classes, produce shows for primary and high school audiences, and run workshops and classes for children.

Lee created Statepeare, a modern-day touring production of Shakespeare plays, aimed at high school students. It was nominated for a Helpmann Award in 2012 for Best Presentation for Children.

In 2011, Lee won a Groundling Award for Outstanding Contribution by an Actress for Animal Farm. The following year, she won the same award for her role in a stage production of 1984.

=== Film and television ===
Lee has acted in several film and television productions based in Brisbane, including All My Friends Are Leaving Brisbane (2007) and Jucy (2010). Additionally, she has voiced animations, radio commercials and television commercials.

Most recently, Lee played the main role in 2026 film All My Friends Are Back in Brisbane, a sequel to All My Friends Are Leaving Brisbane.

== Credits ==
=== Film ===
Year	Title	Role	Notes	Ref.
2005	The Underdog's Tale	Anna		
2006	Seize the Day	Tacita	Short	
2009	Leader of the Pack	Betty	Short	
2007	All My Friends Are Leaving Brisbane	Smug Girlfriend		
2010	Jucy	Fleur		
2012	Reef 'n' Beef	Research Assistant		
2014	The Inbetweeners 2	Susie		
2014	Talking Back at Thunder	Tennielle		
2026	All My Friends Are Back in Brisbane	Cris		

=== Television ===
Year	Title	Role	Notes	Ref.
2006	Mortified	Trudi (voice)	1 episode	
2009; 2010	Sea Patrol	Meili / Café Girl	2 episodes	

=== Theatre ===
Year	Title	Role	Notes	Ref.
2005	The Kooky Christmas Counterfeit			
2006	The Works of William Shakespeare (By Chicks)	Various	Brisbane Festival / Sydney Street Theatre	
2006	Fragments	Narrator 1	Backbone Arts	
2005–2006	Newton's Law	Leibniz	Strut & Fret / Qld Arts Council national tour	
2007	Shake Up!	Liz	Shake & Stir	
2007	Lexi Turns to Stone	Lola	Switchboard Arts	
2007	At Your Service	Maggie	Switchboard Arts	
2007	Alice	Mouse / Dormouse / Oyster / Haigha	Harvest Rain Theatre Company	
2007	A Property of the Clan	Jade / Marian	Queensland Theatre Company	
2007	A Midsummer Night's Dream	Fairy	4MBS Classics	
2008	Statespear	Jay (also writer)	Shake & Stir / Festival Cairns	
2008	Romeo and Juliet	Juliet	Shake & Stir	
2008	Magda's Fascination With Wax Cats	Magda	Metro Arts Theatre, Brisbane	
2008	25 Down (Workshop & Playreading)	Emma	Brisbane Writers Festival / Queensland Theatre	
2009	Maxine Mellor's Mystery Project	Actor		
2009	The Crucible	Susanna Walcott	Queensland Theatre	
2009; 2011	Statespeare	Jay (also writer)	La Boite, Brisbane & national tour with Shake & Stir	
2010	Catholic School Girls	Wanda	Madcat / Three Sisters Productions	
2010	I Crave MySpace	Kate	Shake & Stir	
2010	Bard-Wired	Various	Shake & Stir	
2010	Property of the Clan			
2011	An Oak Tree	Patient	Queensland Theatre	
2011; 2013	Animal Farm	Mollie / Clover	QPAC, Brisbane & national tour with Shake & Stir	
2012	The Trouble with Harry	Woman	World Theatre Festival	
2012; 2014	1984	Julia (also adaptor)	National tour with Shake & Stir	
2013	Out Damned Snot	Kimmy (also co-writer)	La Boite, Brisbane with Shake & Stir	
2013	Tequila Mockingbird	Mel / Rachel (also writer)	QPAC, Brisbane with Shake & Stir	
2015	Roald Dahl's Revolting Rhymes and Dirty Beasts	Various	La Boite, Brisbane with Shake & Stir	
2015; 2017	Dracula	Mina Murray (also adaptor)	Shake & Stir	
2016	Tequila Mockingbird	Actor (also writer)		
2016	Wuthering Heights	Actor		
2016–2018	Roald Dahl's George's Marvellous Medicine	Actor		
2019	Jane Eyre	Jane	Shake & Stir	
2019	Fantastic Mr Fox	Farmer Bunce	Shake & Stir	

== External sources ==
- Official website Shake & Stir
