= The Claremont Murders =

2023 Australian television miniseries

- Genre: Drama
- Based on: The Claremont Serial Killings
- Directed by: Peter Andrikidis
- Starring: Ryan Johnson; Catherine Văn-Davies; Aaron Glenane; Laura Gordon; Kate Ritchie; Erik Thomson
- Country of origin: Australia
- Original language: English
- No. of episodes: 2

Original release
- Network: Seven Network
- Release: 2 August – 9 August 2024

The Claremont Murders is an Australian television crime drama miniseries made for the Seven Network and released 10 April 2023. Produced by Peter Andrikidis, Jamie Hilton and Kerrie Mainwaring, the series follows the investigation by the Western Australia Police Force to catch serial killer Bradley Robert Edwards who went unnoticed in a sea of suspects and Task Force Marco that never let the case go, and news reporter Alison Fan who followed the case from the very beginning until the very end. The two-part series is based on the Claremont serial killings.

== Plot ==
When three young women Sarah Spiers, Jane Rimmer and Ciara Glennon go missing in Claremont, Western Australia, the Western Australian police launch a massive investigation into the disappearances as it turns into a major crimes investigation with endless suspects. As the years go by, the investigating police must contend with a public demanding answers, grieving families, media reporting on the case and numerous suspects. Task Force Marco is set up to investigate the murders of the three women, as there are advances in technology during the 25 year investigation. The breakthrough during the case is when a fingernail is found in the car of the killer. This piece of vital evidence finally puts away a monster.

== Cast ==
The cast named when images for the series were released on 8 April 2023:

- Ryan Johnson as Bradley Robert Edwards
- Catherine Văn-Davies as Alison Fan
- Aaron Glenane as Det Gavin Wyatt
- Laura Gordon as Det Bobbi MacAllister
- Tasma Walton as Karin Margoulis
- Kate Ritchie as Carol Spiers
- Erik Thomson as Don Spiers
- Hannah Penman as Sarah Spiers
- Tom O'Sullivan as Lance Williams
- Noel O'Neill as Dennis Glennon
- Sophia Forrest as Amanda Spiers
- Ally Harris as Ciara Glennon
- Carla Bonner as Living Witness
- Steve Le Marquand as Trevor Rimmer
- Amy Mathews as Michelle Bowman

== Production ==
The series was filmed in Western Australia and was set to air in 2022, but was pushed back until the following year.

== Episodes ==
| Episode | Title | Date | Viewers | Ref |
|---|---|---|---|---|
| Episode 1 | Part 1 | 10 April 2023 | 442,000 | |
| Episode 2 | Part 2 | 17 April 2023 | 382,000 | |

== Reception ==
Mark Naglazas said the series was "too tasteful" for those who regularly watch crime serials and "too close to home" for those who were living in the nightmare.

John Mangan rated the series 3 1/2 stars, saying that the series was a troubling account of real events, with the focus on the grief-struck parents of the victims to hold the story together.

The father of one of the victims, Denis Glennon, labelled the series unnecessary and insensitive. He said the series also served no value to the public, and further revealed that the early days of the investigation into his daughter's death caused him immense pain and grief.
