= All My Friends Are Back in Brisbane =

2026 Australian film

- Directed by: Louise Alston
- Written by: Stephen Vagg
- Based on: All My Friends Are Returning to Brisbane by Stephen Vagg
- Produced by: Louise Alston; Andrew Steel; Stephen Vagg
- Starring: Nelle Lee; Andrew Steel; Kym Jackson; Dan Ewing
- Cinematography: Chase Brockett
- Edited by: Emma McKenna
- Music by: Pru Montin
- Production company: Bunker Productions International
- Release date: May 1, 2026 (Gold Coast Film Festival)
- Running time: 77 minutes
- Country: Australia
- Language: English
- Budget: $13,000

All My Friends Are Back in Brisbane is a 2026 Australian romantic comedy-drama film directed by Louise Alston, written by Stephen Vagg and starring Nelle Lee. Based on Vagg's 2023 stage play All My Friends are Returning to Brisbane, it has been described as a "spiritual sequel" to All My Friends Are Leaving Brisbane (2007), which Alston and Vagg also respectively directed and wrote.

== Premise ==
A woman, Cris, is dumped by her fiance in London and returns to Brisbane after a decade away. She reconnects with her best friend Michelle, and goes to work with her ex-boyfriend, Scooter, who is married and has a child.

== Cast ==
- Nelle Lee as Cris
- Andrew Steel as Scooter
- Kym Jackson as Michelle
- Dan Ewing as Neil Hutchison
- Tim Ross as Aram
- Julian Curtis as Toby
- Brooke Lee as Ainsley
- Cindy Nelson as Vicky
- Matt Domingo as Dom
- Christopher Sommers as Kane
- Adam Koudi as Trey
- Megan Alston as Becky
- Amy Ingram as AJ
- Matt James as Liam
- Jackson Steel as Fraser
- Nicholas Clasohm as Rory
- Jolie Sainsbury as Leith

== Production ==
The film is based on Vagg's stage play All My Friends Are Returning to Brisbane, which was given a public reading in 2022 and a staged production in 2023.

The film was shot over April and May 2025 in Brisbane. The budget was given as $13,000 although this appears to be a cash budget and not including deferrals. One of the characters, Neil Hutchison, is named after the head of drama at ABC in the 1950s.

== Release ==
The film had its world premiere at the Gold Coast Film Festival, where it won Best Queensland Feature. It went into general release in Brisbane on May 29, 2026. Originally booked for three sessions at Five Star Cinemas in New Farm, the film was given an additional week at the cinema due to all three sessions selling out, before being given additional screenings due to high demand and positive word of mouth. Alston and Vagg attended each screening to provide a question-and-answer session.

== Reception ==
Rob McKnight of TV Blackbox wrote "I was genuinely engaged with the story, made lovingly by a cast and crew... a delightful story." Phillipe Blake in The Big Curious called it "a very honest, very funny, very Brisbane film about the specific experience of coming home to a city that has changed around you, and finding out whether you've changed too.” Lloyd Marken of Scenestr called it "a charming and witty dramedy".
