= Cindy Nelson (actress) =

Cindy Nelson is a Brisbane-based actor best known for playing the lead role in the 2010 film Jucy, which was partly based on the real-life friendship between herself and co-star Francesca Gasteen. The film had its world premiere at the Toronto International Film Festival.

== Filmography ==
- All My Friends Are Leaving Brisbane (2007)
- Jucy (2011)
- All My Friends Are Back in Brisbane (2026)
