= Damien Freeleagus =

Australian actor

Damien Freeleagus is a Brisbane-born actor whose credits include the films Jucy (2010) and Primal (2010). He also directed the short film Bird Therapy which was a Tropfest finalist in 2011.

== Select Credits ==
- All My Friends Are Leaving Brisbane (2007)
- Primal (2010)
- Home and Away
- Jucy (2010)
- Bird Therapy (2011) - short (also directed)
