= Claremont serial killings =

1990s serial murders in Western Australia

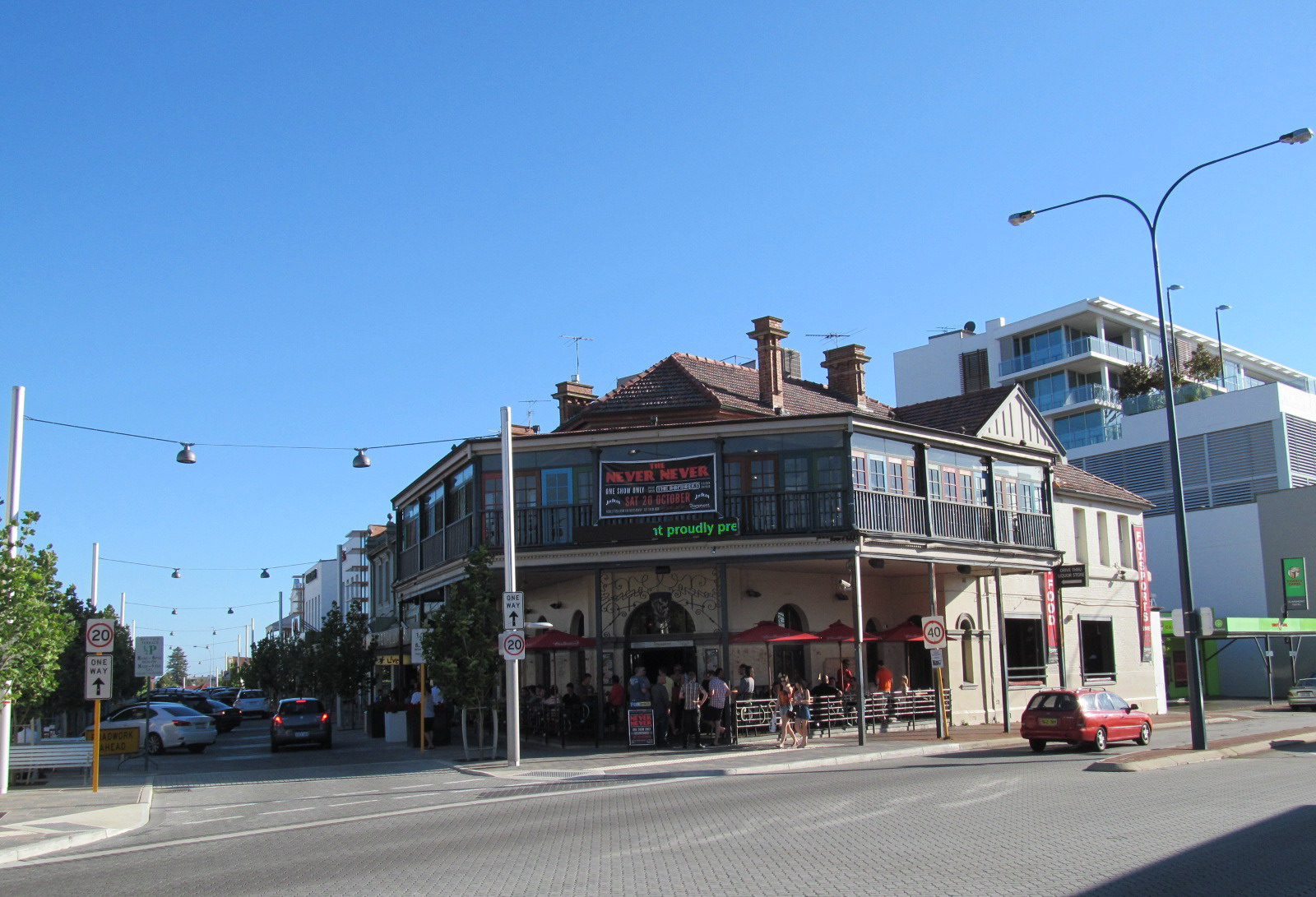
- The Claremont Hotel, formerly known as Continental Hotel, where one of the victims was last seen alive
- Location: Claremont, Western Australia
- Date: 27 January 1996–14 March 1997
- Victims: 2–3+
- Perpetrator: Bradley Robert Edwards
- Verdict: Guilty of two counts; Not guilty of one count
- Convictions: 2 × wilful murder
- Convicted: 24 September 2020

The Claremont serial killings is the name given by the media to a case involving the disappearance of an Australian woman, aged 18, and the killings of two others, aged 23 and 27, in 1996–1997. After attending night spots in Claremont, a suburb of Perth, Western Australia, all three women disappeared in similar circumstances leading police to suspect that an unidentified serial killer was the offender. The case was described as the state's biggest, longest running, and most expensive investigation.

In 2016, a suspect, Bradley Robert Edwards, was arrested. He was held on remand, and his trial began in November 2019, ending on 25 June 2020 after seven months of hearings and evidence from more than 200 witnesses. On 24 September 2020, he was found guilty of the murders of Jane Rimmer and Ciara Glennon, and not guilty of the murder of Sarah Spiers whose remains have yet to be located. On 23 December 2020, Edwards was sentenced to life in prison with the possibility of parole after 40 years.

== Background ==
The case began with the disappearance of Sarah Spiers (aged 18) on 27 January 1996, after she left Club Bayview in the centre of Claremont at around 2:00 am. At 2:06 am, Spiers called Swan Taxis from a public telephone booth. Although she was living in South Perth with her older sister at the time, she had requested to be taken to the nearby suburb of Mosman Park. She was then sighted waiting alone near the corner of Stirling Road and Stirling Highway by three eyewitnesses, who also mentioned seeing an unidentified car stopping where she was waiting. However, she was not at the site when the responding taxi arrived at 2:09 am. Her disappearance soon attracted massive publicity and her fate remains unknown.

In the early hours of Sunday 9 June 1996, Jane Rimmer (aged 23) from Shenton Park, also disappeared from the same part of Claremont. Similar to Spiers, she had been out socialising with friends the night before. Rimmer's friends explained how they had moved from the Ocean Beach Hotel to the Continental Hotel and then Club Bayview. Noting the long line at the club, her friends then caught a taxi home, but Jane opted to stay, and she was last seen on security footage waiting outside the Continental at 12:04 am. Fifty-five days later, on Saturday, 3 August 1996, her naked body was found 40 kilometres (25 mi) south in bush-land near Woolcoot Road, Wellard by a family picking wildflowers.

Nine months later, in the early hours of Saturday 15 March 1997, Ciara Glennon (aged 27), a lawyer from Mosman Park, also disappeared from the Claremont area. Like the others, she was with friends at the Continental and had decided to make her own way home. Three men at a bus stop saw Glennon walking south along Stirling Highway at approximately 12:30 am, and observed her interacting with an unidentified light-coloured vehicle which had stopped by her. Nineteen days later, on 3 April, her semi-clothed body was found by a bush walker, 40 kilometres (25 mi) north, near a track in scrub off Pipidinny Road in Eglinton.

== Investigation ==
Within 48 hours of the disappearance of Spiers, the case was taken over by the Major Crimes Squad. After the disappearance of Rimmer, the Western Australia Police set up a special task-force called "Macro" to investigate the two similar cases. Macro was headed at first by Paul Ferguson, then David Caporn. After the disappearance of Glennon, police confirmed that they were searching for a serial killer, and the Government of Western Australia offered a $250,000 reward, the largest ever offered in the state at that time.

Initial inquiries centred on the unidentified vehicles seen at two of the locations, and on an unidentified man seen in the video footage. Suspicion then focused on Perth's taxi drivers, because the women were last seen in circumstances where they may have used taxis. This included a driver who claimed to have transported Spiers the night before her disappearance. A massive fingerprint and DNA-testing exercise was then carried out on the thousands of taxi drivers licensed in Western Australia. Given evidence of a number of unlicensed operators, examining standards for eligibility were raised, and 78 drivers with significant criminal history were de-licensed. Stricter standards were also applied to verifying that decommissioned taxis were stripped of insignia and equipment. In December 2015, investigators finally revealed that fibres taken from Rimmer were identified as coming from a Holden Commodore VS Series 1, one of the cars seen that night.

Macro attracted both praise and criticism for its handling of the case. At its peak, it had over 100 members across 10 teams. To avoid leaks, strict confidentiality protocols were implemented, and details of the nature of the deaths and injuries were suppressed. One of the tactics used by Macro was the controversial distribution of questionnaires to 110 "persons of interest", including various confrontational enquiries such as "Are you the killer?" Another was its reliance on international experts and use of an imported lie detector machine. Further, one of its officers accepted an offer by David Birnie to assist the investigation. The taskforce was also censured for its overly narrow focus, under Caporn, on Lance Williams. He remained the prime suspect for many years despite a lack of direct evidence (as occurred in the cases of Andrew Mallard and Lloyd Rayney). Over its lifetime, Macro had 11 police reviews, including one in August 2004 led by Paul Schramm, the officer who had led the Snowtown investigation. It was finally wound down in September 2005 and the investigation moved to the Special Crimes Squad.

== Suspect ==
Bradley Robert Edwards
- Born: 7 December 1968 (age 57); Merredin, Western Australia
- Status: Imprisoned
- Penalty: Life imprisonment with a non-parole period of 40 years

Details
- Span of crimes: 27 January 1996 – 14 March 1997
- Country: Australia
- State: Western Australia

In April 1998, a public servant from Cottesloe, Lance Williams (aged 41), was identified by police as the prime suspect, after his behaviour attracted their attention (e.g. driving around after midnight and circling the Claremont area up to 30 times) during a decoy operation. Subjected to a high level of surveillance and police pressure over several years, Williams maintained his innocence. After interviewing him six times at length, police declared in late 2008 that he was "no longer a person of interest". Williams died in 2018.

It was reported that police also investigated whether 'backpacker murderer' Bradley Murdoch may have been involved, although Murdoch was serving a custodial sentence from November 1995 until February 1997. In October 2006, it was also announced that British murderer Mark Dixie was a prime suspect in the killings, and that Macro had requested DNA samples. However, Western Australia Police Deputy Commissioner Murray Lampard was later quoted as saying: "Dixie was closely investigated at the time and eventually ruled out as a suspect."

On 22 December 2016, Bradley Robert Edwards was arrested at his Kewdale house in relation to the deaths of both Jane and Ciara. The next day, he was charged with both murders. According to ABC News, he is believed to have had no previous link to the case, though he had pleaded guilty to the aggravated assault of a social worker at Hollywood Private Hospital on 7 May 1990. He was also charged in relation to two other attacks: the house break-and-enter and unlawful detention of an 18-year-old woman in Huntingdale on 15 February 1988 (where a stolen kimono with his DNA was dropped as the attacker fled), and the unlawful detention and two counts of aggravated sexual penetration without consent of a 17-year-old girl in Claremont on 12 February 1995. (Note: The victim was taken in Rowe Park, shortly after exiting Club Bay View. She was tied, raped, stripped, and abandoned in Karrakatta Cemetery. In 2009, DNA evidence linked these cases to the Glennon one.) On 22 February 2018, Edwards was also charged with the wilful murder of the first victim, Sarah Spiers. In all, Edwards was charged with eight offences, (Note: Edwards was charged with: Count 1: On 15 February 1988, at Huntingdale, the accused broke and entered the dwellinghouse of EWH with intent to commit an offence therein and the offence was committed at night.; Count 2: On the same date and at the same place as count 1, the accused unlawfully deprived ALH of her personal liberty.; Count 3: On 12 February 1995, at Claremont and elsewhere, the accused unlawfully detained KJG.; Count 4: On the same date as in count 3, at Karrakatta, the accused sexually penetrated KJG without her consent, by penetrating her vagina with his penis, and did bodily harm to KJG, and did an act which was likely to seriously and substantially degrade or humiliate KJG.; Count 5: On the same date and at the same place as count 4, the accused sexually penetrated KJG without her consent, by penetrating her anus with his penis, and did bodily harm to KJG, and did an act which was likely to seriously and substantially degrade or humiliate KJG.; Count 6: On or about 27 January 1996, at Claremont and elsewhere, the accused wilfully murdered Sarah Jane Spiers.; Count 7: On or about 9 June 1996, at Claremont and elsewhere, the accused wilfully murdered Jane Louise Rimmer.; Count 8: On or about 15 March 1997, at Claremont and elsewhere, the accused wilfully murdered Ciara Eilish Glennon.) and on 21 October 2019, Edwards pleaded guilty to the five non-murder charges (at Huntingdale and at Karrakatta Cemetery).

=== Trial ===
Before the trial, the prosecution applied for Edwards to be tried by judge alone without a jury. The application was granted due to the publicity surrounding the case and the graphic nature of the evidence. The murder trial began on 25 November 2019, before Supreme Court Justice Stephen Hall. During the trial, the court was told that two of the victims had defensive wounds. Edwards' DNA was also found under Glennon's fingernails (and matched to the kimono) although the defence argued this evidence was contaminated in the laboratory.

One of the main pieces of evidence was the Telstra work vehicles; Edwards was working as a technician at the time, and it was claimed that he used company vehicles after hours to execute the crimes. This was corroborated by a witness, a security guard, who recalled seeing a Telstra van parked on multiple occasions at the Karrakatta Cemetery "for no apparent reason", both after the 1995 attack and before Spiers' 1996 disappearance. According to the prosecutor, Carmel Barbagallo, the state presented this evidence as part of a case called "Telstra Living Witness project" where, between 1995 and 1997, a man with a Telstra station wagon stopped to look at women and offer them rides.

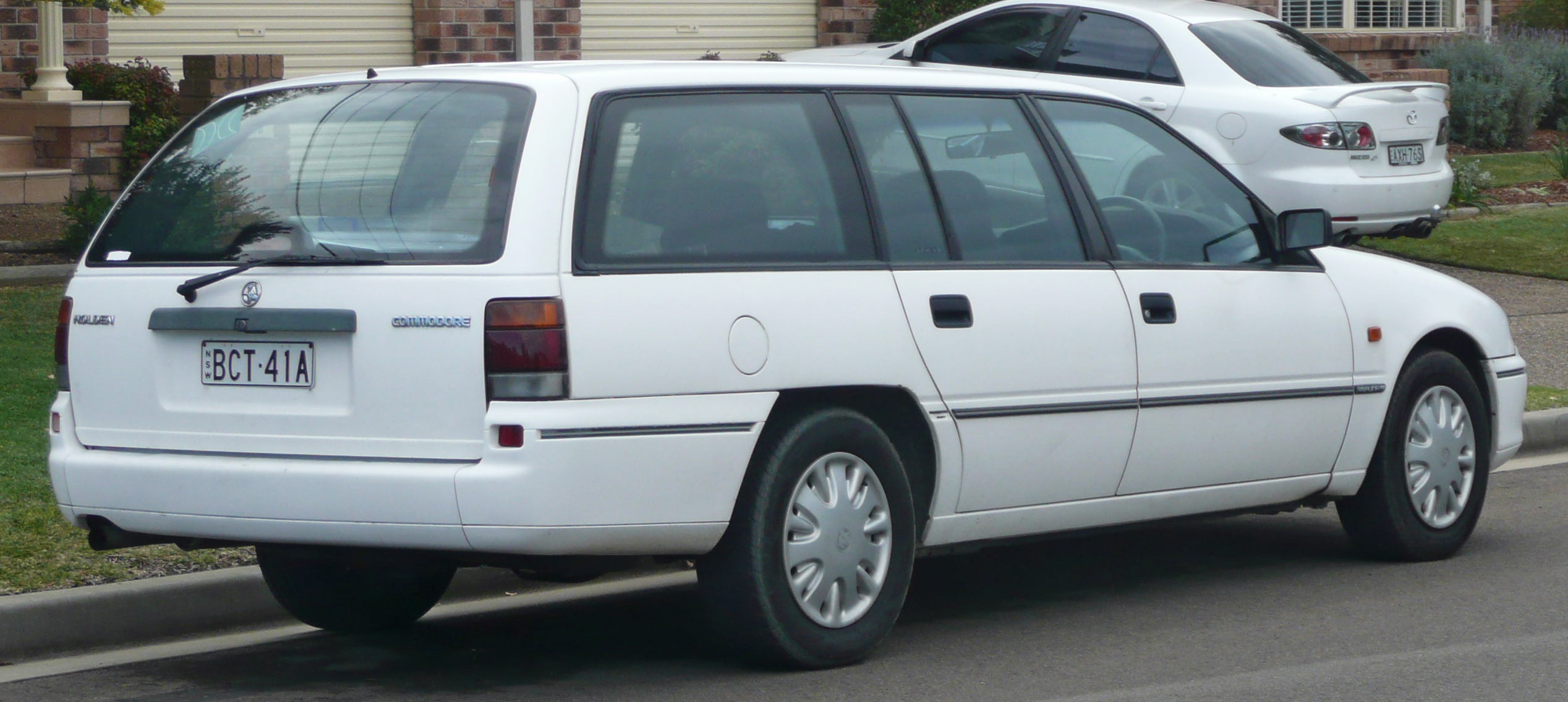
1995-1996 Holden Commodore VS Executive station wagon 03, the same model as Edwards's car.

During the trial, a witness from the group of men dubbed "Burger Boys", identified a Series 1 Holden Commodore VS station wagon as cruising past them shortly after Glennon walked past. The vehicle had distinctive tear-drop hubcaps which were present on some Series 1 VS Commodores Between April 1996 and December 1998, Edwards drove a white VS Series Commodore wagon with Telstra logos. The vehicle was tracked down and impounded on the same day as his arrest. During the hearing, it was revealed that fibres matching carpet in the rear of Edwards' vehicle matched fibres found on the bodies of both Rimmer and Glennon although defence argued these fibres could have come from another source or another vehicle which was not included in the Western Australian crime database.

The trial concluded on 25 June 2020, after seven months of hearings and evidence from more than 200 witnesses. Justice Hall then retired to consider his verdict in the case, flagging that it may potentially be handed down before Edwards's remand in custody ended on 24 September 2020. On the final day of custody, Hall handed down a 619-page written verdict within which Edwards was found guilty of the murders of Jane Rimmer and Ciara Glennon, but not of Sarah Spiers (though it was "more likely" that Edwards was involved in her disappearance than not). On 23 December 2020, Edwards was sentenced to life imprisonment with the possibility of a parole after 40 years. Hall said there was a "high likelihood" that Edwards would die in prison.

== Possible related cases ==
In April 2008 journalist Liam Bartlett reported that police told the father of a fourth missing woman, 22-year-old Julie Cutler, that his daughter was probably a victim of the Claremont killer. Cutler, a university student from Fremantle, vanished after leaving a staff function at the Parmelia Hilton Hotel in Perth at 9:00 pm on 20 June 1988. Her car was found in the surf near the groyne at Cottesloe Beach two days later, and her fate remains unknown.

Other possible cases include that of Lisa Brown (aged 19), a sex worker who disappeared on 10 November 1998, and Sara McMahon (aged 20), who disappeared on 8 November 2000.

== Media and popular culture ==
- Australian Story, ABC, November 2007.
- Hunt for a Killer: The Claremont Murders, Crime Investigation Australia, 2008.
- The Claremont Serial Killer, Casefile True Crime Podcast, 20 August 2016.
- Claremont Serial Killings podcast, Post Newspapers, 2019.
- Claremont: The Trial podcast, The West Australian, 2019–2020.
- The Claremont Murders, Seven Network, 2023.

== See also ==
- List of serial killers by country
- List of unsolved murders in Western Australia
