= Caitlin Yeo =

Australian musician and film composer

Caitlin Yeo is an Australian musician and film composer, whose credits include the feature film Jucy, All My Friends Are Leaving Brisbane, and The Rocket. Yeo is a graduate of the Australian Film Television and Radio School and Sydney University. Her work has won a number of awards including 2007 APRA AGSC Screen Music Award for Best Music for a Documentary and 2011 APRA Professional Development Award and received nominations in 2008, 2010 and 2012. She also teaches composition and film music theory at The Australian Institute of Music.

Yeo was nominated for an AACTA Award for Best Original Music Score for her work on The Rocket, but lost against Craig Armstrong of The Great Gatsby. At the APRA Music Awards of 2013 Yeo won Feature Film Score of the Year for The Rocket.

== Select credits ==
- Footy Chicks (2006)
- All My Friends Are Leaving Brisbane (2007)
- Bomb Harvest (2007)
- "The Long Goodbye" (2009)
- "The Matilda Candidate" (2009)
- "Feral Peril" (2009)
- Jucy (2010)
- "Black and White and Sex" (2011)
- "My America" (2011)
- "Ochre and Ink" (2012)
- The Rocket (2013)

== Awards and nominations ==
=== APRA Music Awards ===
The APRA Music Awards are presented annually from 1982 by the Australasian Performing Right Association (APRA), "honouring composers and songwriters". They include the associated Screen Music Awards handed out by APRA, Australasian Mechanical Copyright Owners Society (AMCOS) and Australian Guild of Screen Composers (AGSC), which "acknowledges excellence and innovation in the field of screen composition." In 2018 Yeo was appointed the president of AGSC.

Year	Nominee / work	Award	Result
2007	Bomb Harvest (Caitlin Yeo)	Best Music for a Documentary	Won
2012	Seduction in the City: The Birth of Shopping (Yeo)	Best Music for a Documentary	Nominated
2013	The Rocket (Yeo)	Feature Film Score of the Year	Won
2015	The Great Australian Race Riot (Yeo)	Best Music for a Documentary	Nominated
2016	Getting Frank Gehry (Yeo)	Best Music for a Documentary	Won
2016	Compass (Yeo)	Best Television Theme	Nominated
2018	The Butterfly Tree (Yeo)	Feature Film Score of the Year	Won
2018	The Butterfly Tree (Yeo)	Best Soundtrack Album	Won
2018	The House with Annabel Crabb (Yeo)	Best Music for a Mini-Series or Telemovie	Nominated
2018	Barbara (Yeo)	Best Music for a Short Film	Nominated
2019	Danger Close: The Battle of Long Tan (Yeo)	Feature Film Score of the Year	Nominated
2019	"Where Inspiration Lives: Sydney Opera House" (Yeo)	Best Music for an Advertisement	Nominated
2019	The Pacific: In the Wake of Captain Cook with Sam Neill (Yeo)	Best Television Theme	Nominated
2020	I Want to Make a Film About Women (Yeo)	Best Music for a Short Film	Nominated
2021	Playing with Sharks: The Valerie Taylor Story (Yeo)	Best Music for a Documentary	Won
2021	Wakefield (Maria Alfonsine, Yeo)	Best Music for a Television Series or Serial	Nominated
2022	"Ms Represented with Annabel Crabb" (Andrew Scott & Yeo)	Best Music for a Documentary	Nominated
2022	New Gold Mountain (Yeo)	Best Soundtrack Album	Nominated
2022	New Gold Mountain (Yeo)	Best Television Theme	Won
2022	The PM's Daughter (Basil Hogios & Yeo)	Best Television Theme	Nominated
2022	New Gold Mountain (Yeo)	Best Music for a Mini-Series or Telemovie	Won
2026	He Had It Coming (TV series)	Best Music for a Television Comedy	Nominated
2026	"We Got Away with It" from He Had It Coming	Best Original Song Composed for the Screen	Nominated

=== ARIA Music Awards ===
The ARIA Music Awards is an annual awards ceremony that recognises excellence, innovation, and achievement across all genres of the music of Australia.

Year	Nominee / work	Award	Result	Reference
2021	Wakefield (Season One Official Soundtrack)	Best Original Soundtrack, Cast or Show Album	Nominated	
2026	Every Little Thing	Best Original Soundtrack, Cast or Show Album	Nominated	
