= All My Friends Are Leaving Brisbane =

- Australian film poster
- Directed by: Louise Alston
- Written by: Stephen Vagg
- Produced by: Jade van der Lei; Louise Alston
- Starring: Charlotte Gregg; Matt Zeremes; Gyton Grantley; Cindy Nelson; Romany Lee; Sarah Kennedy; Ryan Johnson
- Cinematography: Judd Overton
- Edited by: Nicola Scarrott
- Music by: Caitlin Yeo
- Production companies: Australian Film Commission; Bunker Productions International
- Distributed by: Accent Film Distribution
- Release date: October 2007 (AUS)
- Running time: 76 minutes
- Country: Australia
- Language: English
- Budget: A$42,000
- Box office: A$42,524

All My Friends Are Leaving Brisbane is a 2007 Australian romantic comedy film directed by Louise Alston and written by Stephen Vagg. It follows Anthea, a 25-year-old girl who hates her job and has to sit back and watch as all her friends move away from her hometown, Brisbane, to make a better life. In 2013, The Guardian referred to it as a "cult film" inspired by "a typically Brisbane lament... the departure of people in their late 20s to Sydney, Melbourne, London or New York."

== Plot ==
Anthea (Charlotte Gregg) is undergoing a crisis of confidence: overworked, no boyfriend, and now all her friends are leaving Brisbane. She is tempted to leave herself, but is opposed by her longtime best platonic male friend Michael (Matt Zeremes).

Michael thinks people who leave Brisbane are copycats who follow the crowd; he is quite happy to stay in Brisbane, he is in a stable job and a stable very low-maintenance "sex-with-the-ex" relationship with his ex-girlfriend, Stephanie (Sarah Kennedy). In short, he is in a rut.

Anthea's temptation to leave Brisbane increases with the impending departure of her flatmate Kath (Cindy Nelson). However, she then hears that her ex-boyfriend Jake (Gyton Grantley) is coming back to Brisbane to live. To Michael's annoyance, she dreams of a great future with him.

Michael is then thrown out of his comfort zone by starting a new relationship with a girl he meets at work; Simone (Romany Lee). Slightly "alternative" and good natured, Simone is totally different from the sorts of girls he normally deals with, and he finds himself in a relationship over which he does not have total control.

On her last day in Australia, Anthea and Michael finally resolve their feelings for each other.

== Cast ==
- Charlotte Gregg as Anthea
- Matt Zeremes as Michael
- Ryan Johnson as Tyson
- Cindy Nelson as Kath
- Romany Lee as Simone
- Sarah Kennedy as Stephanie
- Francesca Gasteen as Natalie
- Micheal Priest as Aram
- Gyton Grantley as Jake

== Production ==
Originally, All My Friends are Leaving Brisbane was a stage performance at the University of Queensland's Cement Box Theatre, where director Louise Alston first saw it. She could see that the story would make an ideal feature film and worked with writer Stephen Vagg on developing a script.

Producer Jade van der Lei then became interested in the film and was able to raise a budget of A$42,000. The film was shot in the middle of a Queensland summer, January 2006, over a three-week period. Afterward, The filmmakers successfully applied for post-production funding from the Australian Film Commission, which enabled additional shooting. The film completed post-production in early 2007 and made its world debut at the 2007 Brisbane International Film Festival.

The film was shot on location in the Brisbane suburbs of New Farm, Paddington, Kangaroo Point, Brookfield and Toowong. It features Brisbane landmarks the Story Bridge and the Royal Exchange Hotel, and refers to Brisbane artists such as Powderfinger, Nick Earls, and John Birmingham. The soundtrack includes a cover version of "Streets of Your Town" from Brisbane band The Go-Betweens by Brisbane singer Dave McCormack.

== Release ==
All My Friends Are Leaving Brisbane was released on 27 May 2008 in Australia through Accent Film.

=== Box office ===
All My Friends Are Leaving Brisbane took $42,524 at the box office in Australia.

=== Adaptation ===
Stephen Vagg wrote an adaptation of the original play which relocated the action to Adelaide. Retitled All My Friends Are Leaving Adelaide, it premiered at the 2012 Adelaide Fringe.

=== Awards ===
All My Friends Are Leaving Brisbane was part of the Official Selection at the Brisbane International Film Festival in 2007. The film received a nomination for Best Adapted Screenplay at the 2008 AFI Awards.

=== Connection to Jucy ===
Many of the cast and crew were used by Louise Alston on her next feature film, Jucy (2011), including actors Cindy Nelson, Francesca Gasteen, Ryan Johnson, and Charlotte Gregg.

== Sequel ==
Vagg wrote a sequel for the stage All My Friends Are Returning to Brisbane which was given a public reading in 2022 and had its world premiere in 2023. In March 2025 filming commenced on the movie adaptation, retitled All My Friends Are Back in Brisbane. Directed by Alston, it stars Nelle Lee, Andrew Steel and Dan Ewing.

== See also ==
- Cinema of Australia
