= Out of the Blue (2008 TV series) =

2008–2009 Australian drama TV series

- Genre: Soap opera
- Created by: John Edwards; Julie McGauran
- Starring: Out of the Blue cast
- Countries of origin: Australia (production); United Kingdom (broadcast)
- Original language: English
- No. of episodes: 130

Production
- Executive producers: John Edwards; Julie McGauran
- Production location: Manly, New South Wales
- Running time: 22 min.
- Production company: Southern Star Entertainment

Original release
- Network: (UK) BBC One/BBC Two (AUS) Network Ten
- Release: BBC: 28 April 2008 – 29 January 2009

Out of the Blue is an Australian serial drama commissioned by the BBC, and produced by Australia's Southern Star Entertainment. It began screening on BBC One on weekday afternoons on 28 April 2008. The programme attracted lower than desired ratings figures, prompting the broadcaster to shift it to its second channel BBC Two from 19 May 2008. The BBC eventually decided not to commission a second series, and the final episode aired on 29 January 2009. The rights to show the first series in Australia were purchased by Network Ten, while in the UK, Channel 5 picked up the repeat rights to Out of the Blue, and began airing all 130 episodes on digital sister channel Fiver in February 2009.

== Premise ==
Set in Sydney beach suburb of Manly, New South Wales, Out of the Blue is a drama that was shown five days a week, about a group of thirty-year-old friends returning home for a high school reunion, which is brought to an end when someone is murdered. An investigation follows as the group attempts to discover which one of them was the killer.

== Background ==
The BBC announced the commissioning of Out of the Blue on 30 November 2007 as a replacement for Neighbours, another Australian soap opera they had lost to Channel 5. Produced by John Edwards and Julie McGauran of production company Southern Star Entertainment, filming began in early 2008, with the BBC initially ordering 130 episodes. The show launched on 28 April in the UK.

== International broadcasts ==
On 29 January 2008, Network Ten announced that they had gained the rights to air Out of the Blue in Australia. The show started airing on the network on 17 November 2008 at 10.30pm and ran in this slot from Mondays to Thursdays each week. The network was looking at an early evening slot, but due to being unable to schedule the show in a 5-nights-a-week early primetime slot due to the show's occasional M rating, Network Ten had to run with a later timeslot. From January 2009, due to lower ratings compared to TEN Late News, it was moved to a weekly Sunday slot. It originally aired one episode on Sunday evening at 5:30pm, though for several weeks Ten aired two episodes from 5:30pm to 6:30pm, however, it was quickly reverted to one episode a week, and sometimes skipping a week due to other circumstances. Early on in 2009, Ten would air episodes that were classified as M on a late Sunday night slot.

The series made its Irish debut on 5 May 2008 on RTÉ One. Screening the show five days a week (compared to the BBC latterly only showing four), RTÉ went on to overtake the UK and began to premiere individual episodes, ultimately airing episode 130 on 12 November 2008.

The series aired all over Africa on the GO channel, a satellite TV channel. Five episodes were shown on Wednesday evenings, repeated at various times during the week.

On 5 January 2009, the series began airing on NET 5 in the Netherlands. The series was shown at 2pm. On the same day, NET 5 started to show Home and Away which aired twice a day at 2.30pm and 6.30pm.

== Reception ==
=== Critical reception ===
Prior to the launch of the series in the UK, an article in The Times described Out of the Blue as "compulsive, classy, fast and slick" and made comparisons to BBC One's long-running soap EastEnders, though the author also expressed concerns over the "logic" and "financial" sense of commissioning a British soap to be set in Australia. Nevertheless, the article stated that the BBC hoped for the show to be a "long-stay resident of the daytime schedule" like Doctors.

Other early reviews were also generally positive. The Daily Telegraph said that the show looked "quite promising" and described its murder mystery hook as "quite neat". A reviewer for The Daily Mirror wrote: "Oo-er. Forget Neighbours, this is more like a warmer Big Chill, Desperate Housewives Down Under or a better-acted Echo Beach, with all kinds of dark secrets buried in the sand waiting to be washed up by the tide." Meanwhile, The Guardian remarked upon the difference in style between Out of the Blue and Neighbours, writing: "Au-ssies! Everybody needs good Au-ssies! But wait a minute ... stepping into Neighbours' slot is something a little more grown up, with drink, gangs and even a murder."

In September 2008, as the long-running murder mystery plot was about to reach its climax, an article on British soap website The Soap Show described the programme as "much underrated", noting that it had built up a "loyal cult audience" in spite of "being moved between channels, subject to frequent schedule changes and often pre-empted for summer sport".

In November 2008, the show's Australian premiere attracted a mixed response from critics. A review in The Australian criticised the programme for having "clunky dialogue" and "over the top" villains, also suggesting that its 10.30pm slot would prove to be a disadvantage. A piece in The Age expressed similar sentiments, claiming: "The real mystery is how a show with a decidedly daytime production style, featuring well-telegraphed plot developments and lingering shots of the characters' puzzled/simmering/distraught expressions, will fare in the cut and thrust of after-dark TV." However, The Daily Telegraph was more positive, predicting that the show would "prove popular for Aussie soap fans who prefer their fare more grown-up than Neighbours".

=== Ratings ===
The show's UK premiere, which consisted of two episodes broadcast back-to-back, attracted 1.2m viewers. The BBC described this performance as "encouraging", but noted that it would take "some time" to consider whether viewers would accept the show in the long-term. Just days later, however, the BBC announced that the programme would be switching from its 2.10pm slot on BBC One to BBC Two at 1pm after ratings had dropped to 654,000 viewers. The corporation stated that the new channel and slot would provide a "stronger home" for Out of the Blue. Viewing figures declined further after the move, dropping to 100,000 viewers. Ratings later averaged out at 125,000 viewers, prompting the BBC to confirm on 1 July that the show would be axed after its first series. The corporation stated that Out of the Blue "just didn't grab hold" of the loyal following required for a soap.

It was later reported that Network Ten had delayed its own launch of Out of the Blue due to its performance in the UK. The network also confirmed that it was concerned over whether the murder mystery plot would make the show unsuitable for a 6pm slot. Nevertheless, a spokeswoman insisted that the show would be on air by the end of 2008, and it finally started airing in a 10.30pm slot from 17 November 2008.

In its first week on air in Australia in November 2008, the show attracted 372,000 viewers for its premiere episode and was still being watched by 321,000 by the end of the week. These figures were seen as respectable for the programme's late night slot. In its second week on the air, the show attracted its highest audience yet, with 477,000 viewers tuning in for Monday night's episode.

In early January 2009, as the show aired for the final time in its 10.30pm slot, ratings ranged from 313,000 to 395,000. However, once it debuted in its weekly Sunday night slot, ratings started to drop, ranging from 170,000 to 306,000. Since the move to Sundays, there have also been frequent schedule changes, with one episode airing after midnight, and the show's airings alternating from 30-minute and 60-minute slots.

=== Later developments ===
Broadcasters in France, the Netherlands, Belgium and Norway also acquired the rights to the series. The head of acquisitions for Norway's TV 2 channel stated that he was confident the show would "share the same success that Home and Away has received in Norway as well as generating the results that our advertisers seek".

In October 2008, Five acquired the repeat rights to all 130 episodes from Southern Star Entertainment, with the intent to show them on Fiver from 2009. This was described as a possible 'lifeline' for the show's future. Five already owns the UK broadcast rights to fellow Australian soaps Neighbours and Home and Away. At the time of the deal, Out of the Blue's BBC Two ratings had increased to 142,000 viewers daily, though this was still down 42% from the average viewers its timeslot had in 2007.

It began screening in New Zealand on 29 September 2009 at 5:30pm-6pm, it had a 2-3week break starting from 18 December before returning in a new timeslot at 1:30pm–2:30pm on 29 December. Its screens on TV2.

Repeats of the show's first series began on Fiver on 2 February 2009. Following enquiries from fans, the broadcaster stated that it had no plans to commission a second series.

=== Awards and recognition ===
Year	Award	Category	Nominee	Result
2009	AWGIE Awards	Television Serial	Sam Meikle, Episode 4	Nominated

== Theme song ==
"Out of the Blue" (composer: Todd Hunter)
The theme is actually two separate musical pieces; the instrumental piece which plays over the intro is "Clocks" by Coldplay, which then merges into the vocals from Todd Hunter's composition, which is only 30 secs long for the actual opening credits and logo. The vocals were written by Mark & Todd Hunter (of Dragon fame) and Joanne Piggot. This was written especially for the show and never released as a single.

== Cast ==
=== Main ===
- Sophie Katinis (Gabby West)
- Clayton Watson (Jarrod O'Donnell)
- Charlotte Gregg (Tracy O'Donnell)
- Renai Caruso (Rebecca 'Bec' Quilter)
- Ryan Johnson (Ian 'Stavva' Jones)
- Katherine Hicks (Poppy Hammond)
- Dylan Landre (Philip 'Philby' McManus)
- Tom Oakley (Jason Conners)
- Daniel Henshall (Adam 'Addo' O'Donnell)
- John Atkinson (Stephen Mulroney)
- Daisy Betts (Peta Lee)
- Olivia Bonnici (Tess McManus)
- Aidan Gillett (Daniel McManus)
- Nathaniel Buzolic (Paul O'Donnell)
- Samara Weaving (Kirsten Mulroney)
- Louis Hunter (Kyle Mulroney)
- Basia A'Hern (Lucia Jones)
- Kim Knuckey (Brian Jones)
- Zoe Carides (Pia Jones)
- Noel Hodda (Ron O'Donnell)
- Diane Craig (Deborah McManus)
- Bernard Curry (Nate Perrett)
- Maggie Dence (Olive Hammond)
- Charlie Rose MacLennan (Zoe O'Donnell)

=== Recurring ===
- Toni Pearen (Justine)
- Sam Haft (Noel)
- Jacinta Stapleton (Tamara)
- Roxane Wilson (Angela Mulroney)
- Shane Withington (DS Simon Wilson)
- Nikki Bennett (Emily)
- Matthew Holmes (Snr Constable Sam Webster)
- Amy Usherwood (Amber)

=== Guests ===
- Gyton Grantley (Alex Jarvis) (2 episodes)
- Paula Arundell (Simone) (1 episode)
- Roy Billing as Mr Holt (1 episode)

== See also ==
- Eldorado - a previously commissioned BBC soap opera, set in Spain
- Richard Saunders, had a cameo appearance on 2 April 2008
