= Renai Caruso =

Australian actress

- Born: 1981 (age 44–45); Serbia
- Education: Victorian College of the Arts (2000); Queensland University of Technology (2004)
- Occupation: Actress
- Years active: 1995–present
- Known for: Out of the Blue; Satisfaction

Renai Caruso is an Australian actress. She has appeared on shows such as Neighbours and Satisfaction.

== Early life and education ==
Caruso studied the Meisner technique in 1999, before undertaking the foundation year at Victorian College of the Arts (VCA) in 2000. In 2002, she studied at The Actors Space, under Aleksi Vellis. She then attended Queensland University of Technology, graduating with a Bachelor of Fine Arts in Acting in 2004.

== Career ==
Prior to her university studies at QUT, Caruso appeared in long-running soap opera Neighbours (1995), playing the recurring guest role of Olivia Rezzara. She also had early guest roles in Ocean Girl (1996), State Coroner (1997), Guinevere Jones (2002).

While undertaking her studies, Caruso appeared in numerous theatre productions including We Will Rock You, Terrain, Terrain, Terrain, Camille, Lion in the Streets, Our Country's Good and Once in a Lifetime.

In 2007, Caruso played Kate in drama film Unfinished Sky, alongside William McInnes, Bille Brown and David Field. before securing a main role as Rebecca 'Bec' Quilter in ensemble drama series Out of the Blue in 2008. She had a small role as a coffee shop attendant in 2009 sci-fi horror feature film Daybreakers, opposite Ethan Hawke, Sam Neill and Claudia Karvan. The same year, she landed a regular role in drama series Satisfaction, playing high-powered PA Tess, who walked away from her career and a relationship with her married boss to resolve her personal issues.

In 2011, Caruso played the recurring role of Madelaine Cruise in Royal Australian Navy drama series Sea Patrol.

Caruso appeared opposite Guy Pearce in several episodes of the first season of ABC crime drama series Jack Irish in 2016, playing Helena Shand. Beginning that year, she also appeared as Rachel Ripley in the third season of Nowhere Boys, continuing the role into season 4 in 2018.

In 2019, Caruso rejoined the cast of Neighbours, in the recurring guest role of Kristin Goodwin, Sonya Rebecchi’s oncologist. Then in 2021, she appeared in drama miniseries Lie With Me (originally known as With Intent), as Jo Murray.

== Filmography ==
=== Film ===
Year	Title	Role	Notes	Ref.
1996	What I Have Written	Student	Feature film	
2007	Unfinished Sky	Kate	Feature film	
2007	The Weight of Sunken Treasure	Mary Somerset	Short film	
2008	The Shed	Samantha	Short film	
2009	Daybreakers	Coffee Shop Attendant	Feature film	
2010	Drawn to Life	Alix	Short film	
2019	The Tree Artist	Joan Monet	Short film	
2020	Deadly Flat	Sarah	Short film	
TBA	Social Distancing	Sicily Rivers	In development	
TBA	True Divide	Lisa	In development	

=== Television ===
Year	Title	Role	Notes	Ref.
1995	Neighbours	Olivia Rezzara	5 episodes	
1996	Ocean Girl	Myreka	1 episode	
1997	State Coroner	Jo Zammit	1 episode	
2002	Guinevere Jones	Lady in Waiting	1 episode	
2006	Monarch Cove	Megan	1 episode	
2007	Mortified	Homeseeker #3	1 episode	
2008	Out of the Blue	Rebecca 'Bec' Quilter	88 episodes	
2009–2010	Satisfaction	Tess	10 episodes	
2010	Packed to the Rafters	Amy Greenblatt	1 episode	
2010	Cops L.A.C.	Sonia Bolton	1 episode	
2011	Sea Patrol	Madelaine Cruise	6 episodes	
2012	Miss Fisher's Murder Mysteries	Mrs. Waddington	1 episode	
2016	Jack Irish	Helena Shand	3 episodes	
2016–2018	Nowhere Boys	Rachel Ripley	5 episodes	
2018	Superwog	Docs worker	1 episode: "Breaking Dad"	
2019	Neighbours	Dr Kristin Goodwin	3 episodes	
2021	Lie with Me (aka With Intent)	Jo Murray	Miniseries, 1 episode	

== Theatre ==
Year	Title	Role	Notes	Ref.
	We Will Rock You		QUT	
	Terrain, Terrain, Terrain	Various roles	QUT	
	Camille Camille		QUT	
	Lion in the Streets	Christine / Joanne / Nellie	QUT	
	Our Country's Good	Elizabeth Morden	QUT	
	Once in a Lifetime	Miss Leighton	QUT	
	Twelfth Night	Officer / Priest	QUT	
2007	Crestfall	Allison	Tap Gallery, Sydney	
	No Time On	Crystal Carlisle	Camberwell Theatre Co, Melbourne	
	Down Side Up	Various roles	Barwon Theatre Co & Music Box Theatre Co	
2026	Coping with Winter		RACV Noosa Resort with Noosa alive!	
