= Ryan Johnson (actor) =

Australian actor (born 1979)

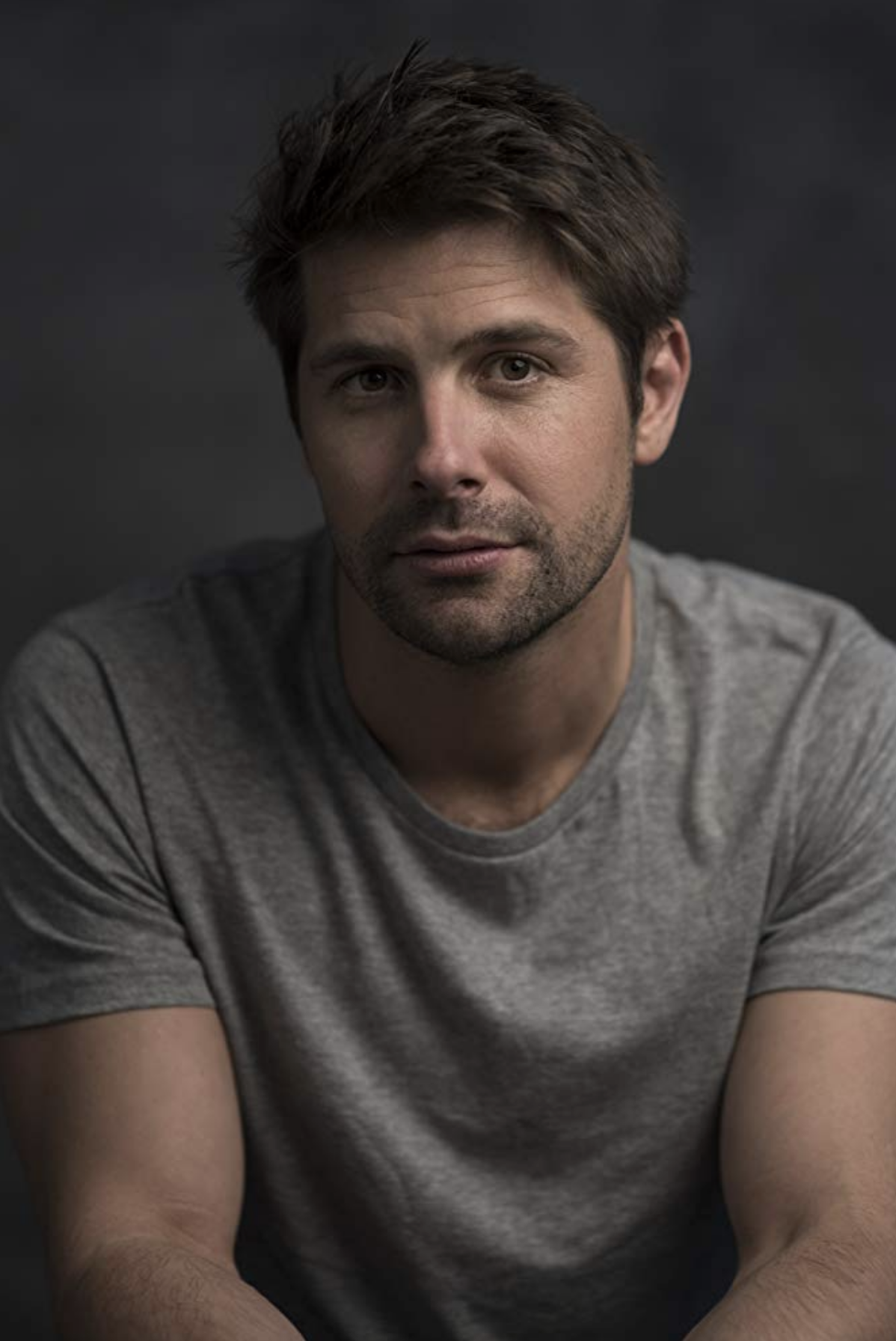
- Ryan Johnson - Photo by Simon Cardwell
- Born: 1979 (age 46–47); Melbourne, Australia
- Occupation: Actor
- Years active: 1999–present
- Spouse: Leah Da Gloria
- Children: 1

Ryan Johnson (born 1979) is an Australian actor.

== Early life ==
Johnson attended Somerset College on the Gold Coast, and graduated from Queensland University of Technology in 1999.

== Career ==
Johnson made his acting debut in 2000 featuring in several performances on stage, television and film, including the film City Loop. That year, he also had guest roles in All Saints, Beastmaster and American TV movie Nowhere to Land. He also toured in a Sydney Theatre Company production of The Beauty Queen of Leenane.

In 2001, Johnson appeared in his first major television role in the short-lived drama series Head Start, playing Kyle Richter, followed by a recurring role as Bobby Bailey in all six episodes of the first season of comedy series Dossa and Joe in 2002. That same year he appeared opposite Tom Berenger and Ryan Kwanten in American sports drama TV movie The Junction Boys, before playing the role of Hammer in 2003 Nick Giannopoulos comedy The Wannabes (known as Criminal Ways in the U.S.), with Isla Fisher.

In 2004, Johnson appeared in comedy film Thunderstruck, alongside Sam Worthington. as well as on stage in production of Brendan Cowell's play Men in Edinburgh. He then scored a starring role in the 2005 fourth season of drama series The Secret Life of Us, playing Zelko Milanovic. The same year, he directed a stage production of Ninja at Sydney's Old Fitzroy Theatre, Sydney.

In 2007, he guested in an episode of CSI: New York, and appeared in comedy drama film All My Friends Are Leaving Brisbane. The following year, he played the role of Dylan in thriller Monkey Puzzle (also known as Enter the Wild), before landing a recurring part as Rocco Arico in the first season of crime drama Underbelly in 2008. That same year, he was cast in the ongoing role of Ian 'Stavva' Jones in drama series Out of the Blue.

Johnson played Paulie Rosetta, brother of Angelo Rosetta (Luke Jacobz), in long-running television soap opera Home and Away in 2010. He also featured in comedy film Jucy, In October 2011, it was announced that he had joined the main cast of US drama Fairly Legal for its second season, as trial attorney Ben Grogan. The series was cancelled at the end of the season, due to low ratings. From 2011 to 2015, he starred in satirical YouTube series One Step Closer to Home, playing one half of 'suburbia’s dullest married couple', Paul, opposite Alyssa McClelland as his on screen wife, Nat. The pair also created the series.

In 2014, Johnson took on several roles, including playing Gary Morris in biographical miniseries INXS: Never Tear Us Apart. He appeared opposite Jessica Marais in drama series Love Child in the ongoing role of Phillip, before playing Will Stevens in the third season of House Husbands. He then reunited with Marais in the TV movie Carlotta.

In 2015, Johnson had a recurring role as Ash Adamo in crime miniseries Hiding, before playing Tim 'Plastic' Pemberton in 2016 two-part miniseries Brock, about Australian car racing legend Peter Brock (Matthew Le Nevez). That same year, he began playing Matt Knight, brother of titular character Hugh Knight (Rodger Corser) in drama series Doctor Doctor, continuing in the role for five seasons, from 2016 to 2021. For his performance, he earned a nomination for the Logie Award for Most Outstanding Supporting Actor in 2017.

Johnson played the role of Ethan in 2018 Australian-Chinese action adventure thriller Guardians of the Tomb, opposite Kelsey Grammer and Kellan Lutz. In 2020, he was part of the supporting cast in comedy-drama series Operation Buffalo, playing Agent Martin. The following year, he joined the cast of Stan comedy drama series Bump, alongside Claudia Karvan, during its second season, appearing through to the show's final season in 2024.

In April 2022, Johnson rejoined the cast of Home and Away as wealthy gambler and villain Peter "PK" King. He also appeared in 2022 comedy drama film How to Please a Woman, in the role of Anthony. The following year, he had a starring role in two-part true crime drama miniseries The Claremont Murders, playing the role of Perth serial killer Bradley Robert Edwards.

In January 2026, Johnson starred as Hamish, opposite Brooke Satchwell as Lillian, in comedy drama miniseries Dear Life.

Johnson's television guest credits include Young Lions, White Collar Blue, The Chaser's War on Everything, My Place, Satisfaction, Sea Patrol, Rake, Laid, SLiDE, Dance Academy, Mr & Mrs Murder, Ready for This, Rake, Operation Buffalo and Upright.

== Awards ==
Year	Work	Award	Category	Result	Ref.
2017	Doctor Doctor	Logie Awards	Most Outstanding Supporting Actor	Nominated	

== Personal life ==
Johnson currently lives with his wife Leah Da Gloria, a fashion designer. He also has a daughter with Tamara Asmar, a television writer.

== Filmography ==
=== Television ===
Year	Title	Role	Notes	Ref.
2000	All Saints	Nick Patterson	Season 3, episode 12: "Food for Thought"	
2000	Beastmaster	Reon	Season 2, episode 8: "Heart Like a Lion"	
2000	Nowhere to Land	Chad	TV movie	
2001	Head Start	Kyle Richter	Season 1, all 40 episodes	
2002	Dossa and Joe	Bobby Bailey	Season 1, all 6 episodes	
2002	Young Lions	Alex Brooks	Season 2, episode 5: "Boy School Bullies"	
2002	The Junction Boys	Mike Hess	TV movie	
2003	White Collar Blue	Jared 'Mungo' Muntz	Season 2, episodes 2 & 17	
2005	The Secret Life of Us	Zelko Milanovic	Season 4, 10 episodes	
2007	All Saints	Conrad Hagan	Season 10, episode 7: "Back on Track"	
2007	CSI: NY	Bob Smith	Season 3, episode 20: "What Schemes May Come"	
2008	Underbelly	Rocco Arico	Season 1, episodes 4-6	
2008	Out of the Blue	Ian 'Stavva' Jones	79 episodes	
2009	The Chaser's War on Everything	Marco	Season 3, episode 3: "The Chaser's Waster of Taxpayer's Money"	
2009	All Saints	Jake	Season 12, episode 35: "The Two of Us"	
2009	My Place	PC Moroney	Season 1, episode 8: "1938 Colum"	
2010	Satisfaction	Steve	Season 3, episodes 6 & 7	
2010	Sea Patrol	Darryl	Season 4, episode 10: "Rawhide"	
2010	Home and Away	Paulie Rosetta		
2010	Rake	Marty	Season 1, episode 2: "R vs Marx"	
2011	Laid	Dave	Season 1, episodes 1 & 6	
2011	SLiDE	Rob	Season 1, episode 4	
2011–2015	One Step Closer to Home	Paul 'Pauly' Shaw	Web series; Seasons 1–2, all 19 episodes (also creator)	
2012	Dance Academy	Dr Dave	Season 3, episodes 12 & 13	
2012	Fairly Legal	Ben Grogan	Season 2, 13 episodes	
2012	Two Flies	Ryan	TV movie	
2013	Mr & Mrs Murder	Michael Gorman	Season 1, episode 11: "Keeping Up Appearances"	
2014	INXS: Never Tear Us Apart	Gary Morris	Miniseries, 2 episodes	
2014	Love Child	Phillip Paige	Season 1, 5 episodes	
2014	House Husbands	Will Stevens	Season 3, 8 episodes	
2014	Carlotta	Peter	TV movie	
2015	Hiding	Ash Adamo	Season 1, 4 episodes	
2015	Ready for This	Dave	Season 1, episode 4: "Shadow Boxing"	
2016	Rake	Raymond	Season 4, episodes 2 & 3	
2016	Brock	Tim 'Plastic' Pemberton	Miniseries, 2 episodes	
2016–2021	Doctor Doctor	Matt Knight	Seasons 1–5, all 48 episodes	
2017	Kiki and Kitty	Brandon	Web series; Season 1, 3 episodes	
2020	Operation Buffalo	Agent Martin	Season 1, 3 episodes	
2021–2024	Bump	Tim	11 episodes	
2022	Upright	Tocca (voice)	1 episode	
2022	Home and Away	PK	8 episodes	
2023	The Claremont Murders	Bradley Robert Edwards	Miniseries, 2 episodes	
2026	Dear Life (aka Love Divided by Eleven)	Hamish Vandenberg	TV series	

=== Film ===
Year	Title	Role	Notes	Ref.
2000	City Loop (aka Bored Olives)	Misha	Feature film	
2001	Jet Set	Young Tourist	Short film	
2002	Stuffed Bunny	Marcus	Short film	
2003	The Wannabes	Hammer	Feature film	
2003	Ned	Henchman Shanahan	Feature film	
2004	Thunderstruck	Lloyd	Feature film	
2004	Book Em	Warren	Short film	
2004	Kevin Needs to Make New Friends: Because Everyone Hates Him for Some Reason	Stewart	Short film	
2005	Europe	European man	Short film	
2005	Son of the Mask	Chad	Feature film	
2007	Ghost Rider	Waiter	Feature film	
2007	All My Friends Are Leaving Brisbane	Tyson	Feature film	
2007	Fallers	Kenneth	Short film	
2008	Monkey Puzzle (aka Enter the Wild)	Dylan	Feature film	
2010	Jucy	Alex	Feature film	
2010	Nic & Shauna	Nicholai	Short film	
2011	Family Values	Tom	Short film	
2012	Gull	Teddy	Short film	
2016	Perry	Ben	Short film	
2018	Concern for Welfare	Sambo	Short film	
2018	Guardians of the Tomb	Ethan	Feature film	
2022	How to Please a Woman	Anthony	Feature film	

== Theatre ==
Year	Title	Role	Notes	Ref.
2000	The Beauty Queen of Leenane	Ray Dooley	Bridge Theatre Coniston, Playhouse Canberra with STC	
2004	Men, by Brendan Cowell		Pleasance Dome, Edinburgh	
2005	Ninja	As Director	Old Fitzroy Theatre, Sydney	
2007	Jesus Hopped the 'A' Train	Angel Cruz	Belvoir, Sydney	
2008	Rabbit	Tom	Wharf Theatre, Sydney with STC	
2009	The Lonesome West	Father Welsh	Belvoir, Sydney	
2016	80 Minutes No Interval	Louis	Old Fitzroy Theatre, Sydney	
