= Robert Jozinović =

Australian film and television actor (born 1979)

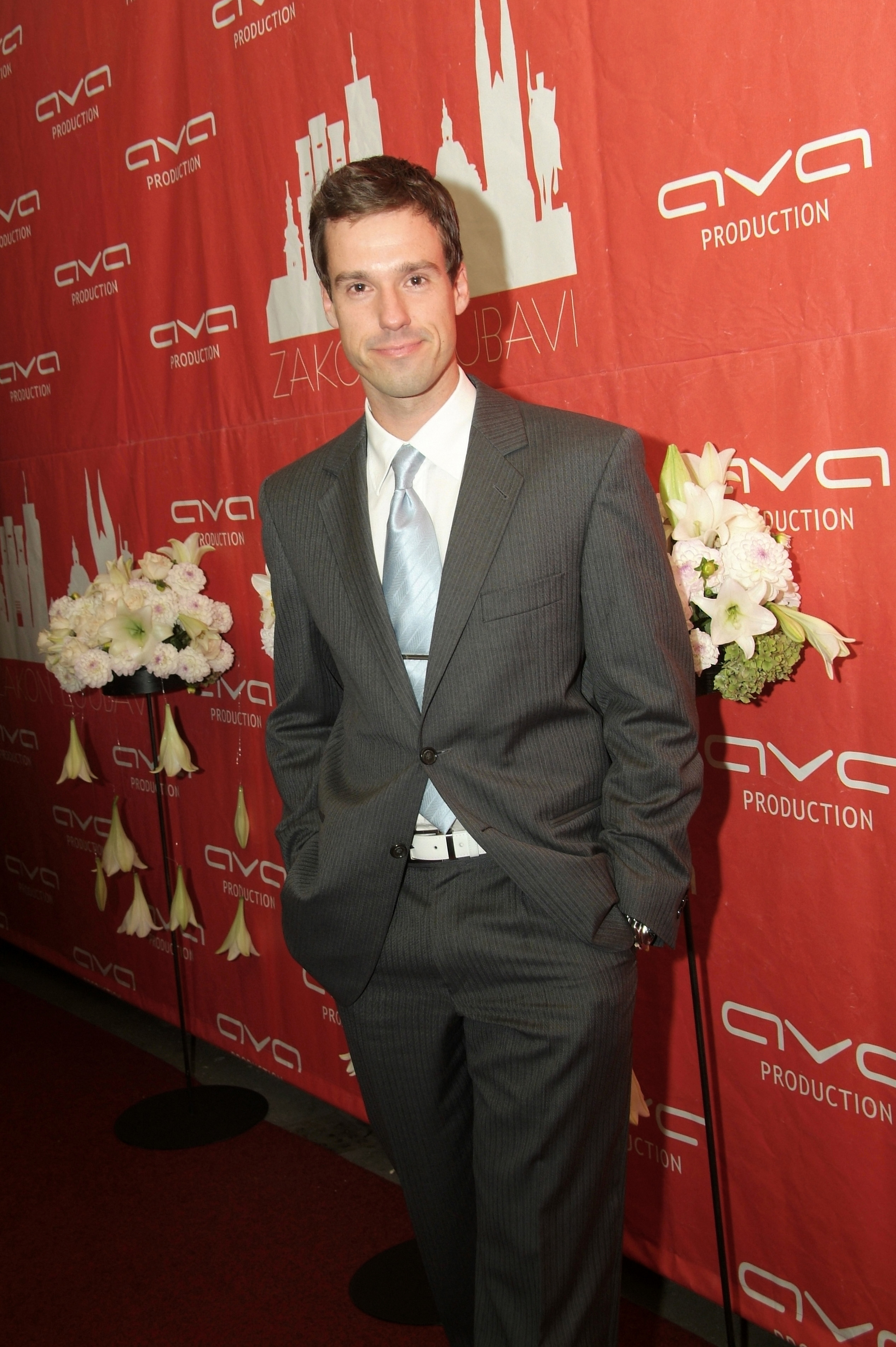
Robert Jozinović at the 2008 Zakon Ljubavi Premiere

Robert Jozinović (Croatian pronunciation: [jozinoʋitɕ]; born 7 April 1979) is an Australian film and television actor.

== Early life ==
Born in Mackay Australia, the eldest of four children to his Croatian parents who immigrated to Australia, settling in Moranbah. Completed his secondary education at St Joseph's College Nudgee and holds two bachelor's degrees from the University of Queensland in Philosophy and Neuroscience.

== Acting ==
=== Early Career 2000–06 ===
Trained for four years at The Actors Workshop Australia, under acting teacher Lyn Kidd. Filming in Australia constituted much of his formative years as an actor, working on independent short films (award-winning films screened at film festivals worldwide), TV commercials (most notable for the Australian Mitsubishi Pajero advert featuring the song Rush by Big Audio Dynamite, music videos (Australian bands The Superjesus, The Living End, and Silverchair's ARIA nominated clip The Greatest View) and small roles in feature films (Undead directed by Spierig brothers).

=== Europe 2006–11 ===
After stops in Munich and London, he found his first major television role in Croatia. Jozinović played English speaking roles in three Croatian telenovelas. In the period-piece Ponos Ratkajevih he played Randy, a British World War II pilot downed in Nazi-occupied territory and in Zakon Ljubavi played Will Markovich, an American-born Harvard law graduate (both screening in five countries). In the Croatian telenovela Larin Izbor Jozinović plays South African police officer Inspector Camden (screening in 17 countries).

He played a small role on the German biopic Max Schmeling, by renowned director Uwe Boll.

Jozinović's most notable role in Croatia was the main cast role of Doctor Dražen Ricijaš in the TV series drama Najbolje Godine. He played an Australian general practitioner. Two seasons of 318 episodes were filmed over two years and constantly gained excellent prime-time viewer ratings. The role was in Croatian. As preparation he enrolled for a semester at the University of Zagreb studying Croatian language. Jozinović's character became quite popular with the viewing public.

== Filmography ==
Film
Year	Title	Role
2001	The Diamond of Jeru	Expat in Bar
2003	Undead	Man in office
2010	Max Schmeling	Journalist No. 1
2015	Full Contact	

Television
Year	Title	Role	Notes
2008	Ponos Ratkajevih	Randy	Guest star (11 episodes)
2008	Zakon Ljubavi	Will Markovich	Guest star (16 episodes)
2009–2011	Najbolje Godine	Dr. Dražen Ricijaš	Main cast (261 episodes)
2011	Larin Izbor	Inspector Camden	Guest star (2 episodes)
2013-	Zora dubrovačka	Alex Vojković	Main cast
