= Robyn Moore (Australian actress) =

Australian actress (born 1971)

- Born: Robyn Alison Moore; 4 November 1971 (age 54); Brisbane, Queensland, Australia
- Occupation: Actress
- Years active: 2000–present

Robyn Alison Moore (born 4 November 1971) is an Australian actress.

== Biography ==
Moore was born in Brisbane. Her first movie role was as an Officer in Locker Room in the zombie film Undead and earned her a role as Mrs. Della Costa in the 2006 Nine Network Australia series Mortified. She began her acting career in the drama short film The Big Picture which was directed by the Spierig brothers and had her first lead role in Australian Television series All Saints. In 2008 she portrayed June Turner in the series K-9 and appeared in the thriller film The Horseman. Her latest role was as Forensic Investigator Simms in Daybreakers.

== Filmography ==
=== Film ===
- The Big Picture (short film) (2000) as Wendy
- Back (short film) (2002) as Meg
- Undead (2003) as Officer in Locker Room
- The Horseman (2008) as Irene
- Daybreakers (2009) as Forensic Investigator Simms
- Mabo (2012) as Barbara Hocking
- Huge (short film) (2012) as Liz
- Sliver Stiletto (short film) (2012) as Detective Morgan
- Bad Karma (2012) as Doctor Morris
- Undertow (2011) as Irene
- My Mistress (2014) as Fiona Pearce

=== Television ===
- All Saints (2001) as Deirdre Furrow (1 episode)
- Mortified (2006) as Principal Della Costa (3 episodes)
- K-9 (2009/10) as Jorjie's Mother June Turner (24 episodes)
- The Gods of Wheat Street (miniseries) (2014) as June Makings (2 episodes)
- Secrets & Lies (miniseries) (2014) as Tech Officer (1 episode)
