= Robyn Moore =

Robyn Moore may refer to:

- Robyn Moore (Australian voice actor) (born 1950), known for voicing Blinky Bill
- Robyn Moore (British actress) (born 1960), British actress known for Eastenders
- Robyn Moore (Australian actress) (born 1971), Australian actress

== See also ==
- Robin Moore (1925–2008), writer
