= The Big Picture (2000 film) =

- Directed by: The Spierig Brothers
- Written by: The Spierig brothers
- Produced by: Dick Marks
- Starring: Robyn Moore; Michael Priest
- Cinematography: The Spierig brothers
- Release date: 2000
- Running time: 13 minutes
- Country: Australia
- Language: English

The Big Picture is the first short film directed by The Spierig Brothers. The film was released in 2000.

The film was included as an extra on the Blu-ray release of Daybreakers.

== Plot ==
A career woman named Wendy never imagined going out with a man named Jack. She never imagined spending time with him. Yet she witnesses life altering events that change her mind.

Jack arrives at night with a white flower to give to Wendy and asks for a dinner date together that night, however Wendy refuses by claiming to be too tired. After Jack leaves, Wendy goes back to her living room, sets the white flower in a vase down on her living room table, pours a glass of wine, and starts flipping through channels on the television until one channel shows her in her own living room. In surprise and fear she knocks over her glass of wine spilling it on the floor and goes to try and find the source of the camera. She notices upon closer examination things do not match up correctly and starts flipping the channel and starts to see an alternate version of Jack giving the flower and her accepting the dinner date of making spaghetti and then making love. She continues to watch as the T.V. continues to show the future of what would have happened such as Jack and Wendy falls in love with each other, their engagement party, moving to a new house, two babies, later one who has grown up and snuck back into the house stubbing her knee against the living room floor waking up an older Wendy who confronts the daughter in a supportive way, a scene of Jack and Wendy as an elderly couple with Jack bringing Wendy another white flower to symbolize their love through the decades, and finally the T.V. channel turns into static. After viewing all of this, an emotional Wendy decides to put on her shoes and cross the street to where Jack lives and is hit by a car in the middle of the street.
