= Hollywood (2002 film) =

2002 Indian science fiction film

- VCD cover
- Directed by: Dinesh Baboo
- Written by: Upendra
- Produced by: Ramu
- Starring: Upendra; Felicity Mason; Ananth Nag
- Cinematography: PKH Das
- Edited by: B. S. Kemparaj
- Music by: Gurukiran
- Production company: Ramu Enterprises
- Release date: 6 December 2002
- Running time: 136 minutes
- Country: India
- Language: Kannada
- Budget: ₹7 crore

Hollywood is a 2002 Indian Kannada science fiction film written by Upendra and directed by Dinesh Babu. It stars Upendra in a triple role as Surendra, Upendra and US 47 (a robot) along with the Australian actress Felicity Mason as Manisha and Anant Nag. The film was shot entirely in Gold Coast, Australia with few supporting actors and a monkey named Lakshmi, voiced by Ramesh Bhat. The film was also dubbed into Telugu in 2003, retaining the same title.

Upendra became the first Indian actor to portray the role of an android robot in a lead role. The same story of this film that a scientist who creates an android resembling himself to help him win over a girl. But, the android falls in love with the girl and tries to eliminate his creator. The film failed to perform commercially at the box office. The 2010 Tamil movie Enthiran was reported to be thematically similar to this movie. However, the Tamil film was announced in 1999 with stills featuring the lead pair and a Robot released officially. Kamal Haasan and Preity Zinta were announced as the lead in Shankar's Tamil film.

== Plot ==
The film is about a man developing a robot in order to woo a girl he likes. The robot can understand her mindset. Upendra is Surendra's twin brother who is passionate about acting in Hollywood films. Surendra and Professor shivaprasad develop a robot, a clone of Surendra which can help him understand Manisha (Felicity Mason). In the end the clone robot ends up loving her as Surendra and Anant Nag fixes a heart on the robot, which gives it feelings.

== Cast ==
- Upendra in a triple role as
  - US 47, the Android Robot
  - Surendra, the Roboticist and
  - Upendra, the director, who is Surendra's twin brother.
- Felicity as Manisha, M- 47
- Ananth Nag as Prof. A. D. Dass, maverick scientist
- A monkey named Melukote Seenu, voiced by Ramesh Bhat
- Robbie Parkin as a police officer

== Production ==
The film was expected to begin production May or June of 2001 with Jyothika initially considered to be the heroine. Murali Mohan, friend of Upendra was originally chosen to direct the film. Manisha Koirala and model Kanishka were also selected before Australian actress Felicity was finally chosen. The songs and climax were completely shot at Australia.

== Soundtrack ==
Hollywood

Soundtrack album by Gurukiran
- Released: 6 December 2002
- Genre: Feature film soundtrack
- Length: 28:22
- Language: Kannada
- Label: Akash Audio
- Producer: Gurukiran

Gurukiran chronology
Dhumm (2002)	Hollywood (2002)	Nandhi (2002)

No.	Title	Lyrics	Singer(s)	Length
1.	"Choo Bide Choo Bide"	Upendra	Udit Narayan	4:21
2.	"Sakkathagide Hollywood"	Upendra	Sukhwinder Singh, Gurukiran, Allwyn	4:20
3.	"Aamantharisi Nanna"	V. Nagendra Prasad	Anupama	5:07
4.	"Prema Prema"	Upendra	Udit Narayan	6:03
5.	"Aeeeyy Aeeyyii"	Upendra	Sunidhi Chauhan, Gurukiran	3:41
6.	"Benkiyalli Haaku"	Upendra	S. P. Balasubrahmanyam	4:52
Total length:				28:24

== Reception ==
A critic from Deccan Herald wrote "You may call it a fantasy or just a hilarious movie. In just one sentence Hollywood is a pure entertainment movie where glitz and glamour are the main ingredients". A critic from India Info wrote "The film HOLLYWOOD, is one of the high budgeted films, that Sandalwood has ever seen. Apart from this it has brilliant performances from Upendra and Ananthnag. Not to forget the monkey. Exotic locales. And the list goes on … Yet the movie has fails to make a mark". A critic from Viggy wrote "There are only two things deserve a mention - dialogs of the monkey Seenu (hired from Chenai) that makes you really laugh and exotic locations. Some of them really remind Hollywood movies. With a combination of good professionals like Upendra, Ramu and Dinesh Babu, it could have been a far superior film. Its hi-time for Upendra to come out of his usual style". A critic from Chitraloka.com wrote "Mr Ramu the proud producer of Kannada filmdom – you have given a lavish film without working on the script and scintillating elements. Dinesh Baboo and Upendra should stop enjoying their ideas at the cost of others money. This film is more a travelogue than narrating a story with artistes".

Reviewing the Telugu dubbed version, The Hindu wrote "The story never matches the technical aspect of the film. The entire drama looks like circus farce. And the subject hinges to the single point of Surendra always doubting Manisha's relations with his brother Upendra. Upendra as Upendra is the best part of the drama, while the rest of the characters look silly. Anant Nag plays a pitiable character of the scientist. Music is uninspiring". Jeevi of Idlebrain.com wrote "Hollywood is a boring film with unimpressive script. You can safely avoid it, even when you get a chance to watch it for free on your idiot box". A critic from Full Hyderabad wrote "The movie is essentially for three kinds of audiences: fans of Upendra, fans of the monkey and fans of filmi experiments. Technically, it all boils down to the same but you can watch Hollywood if you belong to any of these categories".

== Box office ==
Hollywood did not have a good opening at the box office across Karnataka and set the box office on average during its initial weeks, but the film received just mixed response among the audience. The film collected ₹380 million (US$3.9 million) at the box office after completing a 75-day run.
