= The Horseman (film) =

- Theatrical film poster
- Directed by: Steven Kastrissios
- Written by: Steven Kastrissios
- Produced by: Rebecca Dakin; Steven Kastrissios
- Starring: Peter Marshall; Caroline Marohasy; Evert McQueen
- Cinematography: Mark Broadbent
- Edited by: Steven Kastrissios
- Music by: Ryan Potter
- Production company: Kastle Films
- Distributed by: Umbrella Entertainment; Screen Media Ventures
- Release date: 29 June 2008
- Running time: 96 minutes
- Country: Australia
- Languages: English; Gaelic

The Horseman is a 2008 Australian vigilante action psychological thriller film written and directed by Steven Kastrissios and starring Peter Marshall, Evert McQueen and introducing Caroline Marohasy.

== Plot ==
After the drug-induced death of his teenaged daughter, Christian (Peter Marshall) is sent a video tape, a "snuff film" involving his daughter and several men. Christian then decides to avenge his daughter by killing all those linked to the sex tape. Along the way he meets a teenage runaway named Alice (Caroline Marohasy) and a fragile friendship begins to unfold.

== Cast ==
- Peter Marshall as Christian
- Caroline Marohasy as Alice
- Brad McMurray as Derek
- Jack Henry as Finn
- Evert McQueen as Jim
- Christopher Sommers as Pauly
- Bryan Probets as Walters
- Steve Tandy as Devlin
- Chris Betts as Hilton
- Damon Gibson as Chuck
- Hannah Levien as Jesse Fortesky
- Ron Kelly as Det. Adams
- Robyn Moore as Irene
- Warren Meacham as Richards
- Greg Quinn as Kenneth
- Rhye Copeman as Eddie

== Production ==
The Horseman was conceived as a short film. It was filmed in Burpengary, Queensland.

== Release ==
The film came out on DVD and Blu-ray on 1 March 2010 in the UK. The film was part of the Sitges Film Festival, Fantasia Festival, the Film4 FrightFest and South by Southwest 2009. Screen Media Ventures set the limited theatrical run for the United States on 15 June 2010.

== Critical reception ==
While it has been criticised for the brutal violence and content matter, receiving an R rating, writer and director Steven Kastrissios has mentioned he believes that the brutality is essential to the story. It currently has a rating of 60% on the movie review site Rotten Tomatoes based on 30 reviews, with an average score of 5.9/10.

=== Accolades ===
Award	Category	Subject	Result
Melbourne Underground Film Festival	Best Film	Steven Kastrissios	Won
Melbourne Underground Film Festival	Best Director	Steven Kastrissios	Won
