= Philippa Coulthard =

Australian actress

Philippa Anne Coulthard
- Born: Brisbane, Queensland, Australia
- Occupation: Actress
- Years active: 2007–present

Philippa Anne Coulthard is an Australian actress, best known for playing Jorjie in the Doctor Who spin-off series K-9, lead character Amber Mitchell in Lightning Point, and Helen Schlegel in the BBC production of Howards End.

== Early life and education ==
Coulthard is from Brisbane, Queensland, Australia. She attended Hillbrook Anglican School in Brisbane. She started performing on stage in 1996, at the age of four, taking dance classes at Promenade Dance School, where she was trained in singing, acting, and ballet, contemporary and jazz styles of dance.

== Career ==
Her breakthrough television role came with the lead role of Jorjie Turner in the Doctor Who spin-off series K-9 (2009–2010). While completing Year 12 at Hillbrook Anglican School, she landed the lead role of Amber Mitchell in Jonathan M. Shiff's internationally distributed series Lightning Point (2012), also known as Alien Surf Girls.

She then played Tasha Gundelach in the Australian psychological mystery series Secrets & Lies (2014).

In 2017, Coulthard had a recurring role as Tessa Riley in the second season of the ABC series The Catch, produced by Shondaland. That same year, she portrayed Nancy in the horror film Annabelle: Creation, part of The Conjuring Universe franchise.

Coulthard's breakout role came as Helen Schlegel in the BBC/Starz miniseries Howards End (2017), adapted by Academy Award-winning screenwriter Kenneth Lonergan from the E. M. Forster novel, co-starring Hayley Atwell.

== Filmography ==
Film roles
Year	Work	Role	Notes
2013	After the Dark	Poppie	originally titled The Philosophers
2015	Now Add Honey	Clare Morgan	
2017	Annabelle: Creation	Nancy	

Television roles
Year	Work	Role	Notes
2009–10	K-9	Jorjie Turner	Main role
2012	Bikie Wars: Brothers in Arms	Leanne	Episodes 1.05, 1.06
2012	Lightning Point	Amber Mitchell	Main role; also known as Alien Surf Girls
2014	Secrets and Lies	Tasha Gundelach	Main role
2017	The Catch	Tessa Riley	Recurring role (season 2); 7 episodes
2017	Howards End	Helen Schlegel	Miniseries; 4 episodes
2018	Gone	Samantha	Episode 1.09, "Exigent Circumstances"
2019	For the People	Betty Baker	Episode 2.09, "Who Are We Now?"
2022	Darby and Joan	Chantelle	Episode 1.02
