= K9 (TV series) =

Australian science fiction television series (2009–2010)

- K9 title card
- Created by: Bob Baker; Paul Tams
- Developed by: Shayne Armstrong; SP Krause
- Starring: Robert Moloney; Philippa Coulthard; Keegan Joyce; Daniel Webber
- Voices of: John Leeson
- Theme music composer: Michael Lira
- Composer: Christopher Elves
- Countries of origin: Australia; United Kingdom
- Original language: English
- No. of series: 1
- No. of episodes: 26

Production
- Executive producers: Grant Bradley; Jim Howell; Steve Robbins
- Producers: Penny Wall; Richard Stewart; Simon Barnes
- Running time: 25 minutes
- Production companies: Park Entertainment; Stewart & Wall Entertainment; Screen Australia

Original release
- Network: Network Ten (Australia)
- Release: 3 April – 25 September 2010
- Network: Disney XD (UK & Ireland)
- Release: 31 October 2009 – 20 November 2010
- Network: Channel 5 (United Kingdom)

Related
- Doctor Who; K-9 and Company; Torchwood; The Sarah Jane Adventures; Class

K9 is a science fiction adventure series focusing on the adventures of the robot dog K9 from the television show Doctor Who, achieved by mixing computer animation and live action. It is aimed at an audience of 11 to 15-year-olds. A single series of the programme was made in Brisbane, Australia, with co-production funding from Australia and the United Kingdom. It aired in 2009 and 2010 on Network Ten in Australia, and on Disney XD in the UK, as well as being broadcast on other Disney XD channels in Europe.

== Development ==
K9's co-creator Bob Baker (like several 20th-century Doctor Who creators) had contractually retained particular IP rights from the TV episode scripts co-written with Dave Martin and had long sought to produce a television series starring the character. Indeed, in 1997 Doctor Who Magazine announced that Baker and producer Paul Tams were producing a four-part pilot series provisionally called The Adventures of K9. The magazine stated that the pilot would be filmed that year "on a 'seven-figure' budget", and that the BBC had expressed interest in purchasing the broadcast rights. However, funding proved elusive, and despite persistent rumours, the series remained in "development hell" for many years.

Promotional poster from early in the series development, back when it was titled K9 Adventures

In 2006, Jetix Europe announced that they were "teaming up" with Baker, Tams, and London-based distributor Park Entertainment to develop a 26-part series, then titled K9 Adventures and set in space. This announcement, timed to coincide with K9's return to Doctor Who in the episode "School Reunion", was picked up in the British media and Doctor Who fan press. In 2007, Park Entertainment revealed that the main setting for the series (by then retitled K-9) would be the Platte, "an old Prairie-class spacecraft" once used for asteroid colonization. In addition to K9, the characters would include Slocum, a thirty-something "space gypsy", and Djinn, "an overactive computer module in the shape of an attractive young woman". This early premise was abandoned before production began in Australia.

== Production ==
Each episode of K-9 is approximately 25 minutes long, made for Disney XD (formerly Jetix) and Network Ten by Stewart & Wall Entertainment, in association with London-based distribution company Park Entertainment. The project is being overseen by Baker; the television series concept was developed by Australian writers Shane Krause and Shayne Armstrong, in association with Baker and Paul Tams. Krause and Armstrong are the primary writers for the series; four episodes were written by Queensland writer Jim Noble. The series is produced by Penny Wall and Richard Stewart of Stewart & Wall Entertainment Pty Ltd, and Simon Barnes of Park Entertainment. Grant Bradley of Daybreak Pacific and Jim Howell serve as executive producers. Michael Carrington, head of animation and programme acquisitions for BBC Children's, told Broadcast that the BBC had declined the opportunity to be involved in the production of a K9 series, saying, "As the BBC is already committed to a number of spin-off projects, we concluded that a K9 series may simply be an extension too far." BBC-owned characters like the Doctor will not appear in the series, due to rights considerations.

In July 2007, the Australian Film Finance Corporation approved funding for the series, and the programme was pre-sold to Network Ten. The Pacific Film and Television Commission (PFTC) (subsequently renamed Screen Queensland) also provided additional financing. The first series was shot between 3 December 2008 and 8 May 2009. The series is produced in Brisbane, Australia, shooting on location around the city and on a set built in a South Brisbane warehouse. A logo for the series was released on 27 February bearing some similarities to the original font seen on the casing of K9. A trailer produced to promote the series at MIPTV was released on 2 April 2009. As it was made early in production, the music, titles, and voice of K9 were not the final ones used in the programme. A second trailer was released on 1 October 2009.

== Concept ==
K-9 is set in near-future London, with 14-year-old characters Starkey and Jorjie, alongside a Professor Gryffen, who is experimenting with a Space-Time Manipulator, and 15-year-old Darius who runs errands for Gryffen. K9 Mark I follows the villainous reptilian warrior Jixen who came through a space-time portal created by the professor's experiments and saves the Londoners. While protecting them, K9 is forced to self-destruct, but is able to give Starkey instructions to rebuild him in a more advanced form. K9 and the humans then form the front line defence against alien menaces from outer space and other times. The Brisbane Times reports that the series is set in London in the year 2050 and Professor Gryffen is employed by a clandestine government agency, "The Department". The design of K9 is noticeably different from that seen in Doctor Who because although Bob Baker owns the character rights to K9, the original character design is owned by the BBC.

== Connections to Doctor Who ==
As this was not a BBC production, direct references to Doctor Who were not legally allowed for rights reasons. However, Baker and Tams have confirmed that this K9 is the original K9 Mark I, who appeared in Doctor Who from The Invisible Enemy (1977) to The Invasion of Time (1978). This model was last seen in the possession of Leela on Gallifrey; in the first episode, the robot dog is damaged and undergoes a "regeneration" into a new, more advanced form capable of flight. He then explains that most of his memory was damaged, so he cannot remember anything about himself or his past.

The decision to launch the show in Australia on 3 April, the launch date for Doctor Who's "The Eleventh Hour", which introduced Matt Smith as the Eleventh Doctor, was interpreted by the Gawker Media blog io9 as a way of taking advantage of the latter show's popularity to boost interest in the new show.

== Episodes ==
No.	Title	Directed by	Written by	World Premiere (Scandinavia)	UK air date	Australian air date	Prod. code
1	"Regeneration"	David Caesar; Mark DeFriest	Shayne Armstrong; S.P. Krause	11 January 2010	31 October 2009	3 April 2010	142817-1
Whilst Starkey and Jorjie are trying to escape the police, they take refuge in a large detached house, now the residence of reclusive scientist, Professor Gryffen. They come across two Jixen warriors and a robot dog, K9 Mark I. After the ensuing battle with the Jixen, K9 regenerates...
2	"Liberation"	David Caesar; David Napier	Shayne Armstrong; S.P. Krause	18 January 2010	9 October 2010	10 April 2010	142817-2
Having been "tagged" by Jixen slime, Starkey is in hiding from The Department and from the Jixen warrior who survived K9’s blast. Jorjie tells Starkey that the Department is imprisoning Aliens, and K9 flies off to investigate. Jorjies’s mother turns out to be Department inspector June Turner, and there is a confrontation as the youngsters and K9 try to help release the innocent Aliens. Starkey confronts the Jixen with dire consequences.
3	"The Korven"	Karl Zwicky	Tim Pye	25 January 2010	3 April 2010	17 April 2010	142817-3
Starkey is homeless and K9 and Jorjie try to help. Gryffen’s assistant Darius contacts them after the Professor, an agoraphobic, disappears from the mansion. A warning from the 50th century is received, and K9 and the youngsters give chase to a mind-sucking alien called the Korven, who has snatched Gryffen.
4	"The Bounty Hunter"	James Bogle	Ian McFadyen	1 February 2010	4 April 2010	24 April 2010	142817-4
K9 becomes confused about his memory loss when an alien "bounty hunter" arrives and teams up with an evil Department inspector called Drake. Ahab, the Bounty Hunter, claims there is a price on K9’s head for murdering a galactic peace delegate in the 50th century.
5	"Sirens of Ceres"	Daniel Nettheim	Deborah Parsons	8 February 2010	10 April 2010	1 May 2010	142817-5
Drake uses a strange alien substance on a group of school children in an experiment to gain control of the population. Jorjie stumbles across the plan, and K9 and Starkey have to find and destroy the control devices.
6	"Fear Itself"	Karl Zwicky	Everett DeRoche; Graeme Farmer	15 February 2010	11 April 2010	8 May 2010	142817-6
London is out of control; riots erupt due to irrational fear. The focus of the paranoia is based in an old junkyard where a strange alien consciousness is at work. K9 discovers the emotion of fear for himself in his bid to thwart the unknown.
7	"The Fall of The House of Gryffen"	Daniel Nettheim	Shayne Armstrong; S.P. Krause	22 February 2010	12 June 2010	15 May 2010	142817-7
Darius, Starkey and Jorjie spend a very spooky evening at Gryffen’s mansion, as spectres from Gryffen’s past materialise, causing mayhem. K9 sees the "ghosts" for what they really are, and the group have to convince Gryffen before the youngsters' life forces are drained away so that the alien energy beings can take physical form.
8	"Jaws of Orthrus"	James Bogle	Lindsay James	1 March 2010	17 April 2010	22 May 2010	142817-8
Inspector Drake is attacked by K9, or so it seems. June Turner and the Department have orders to capture K9 and destroy him. However, Starkey discovers Drake has had a basic double of K9 built to discredit him.
9	"Dream-Eaters"	Daniel Nettheim	Jim Noble	8 March 2010	18 April 2010	29 May 2010	142817-9
An ancient stone obelisk is unearthed by the Department, and an alien force is unleashed that literally starts inducing everyone to sleep and dream. The Bodach feed on brain waves, and what better entrees than human nightmares?
10	"Curse of Anubis"	Karl Zwicky	Jim Noble	15 March 2010	24 April 2010	5 June 2010	142817-10
K9 meets the Anubians, a race he helped in his long-forgotten past. Once placid, these creatures have now become warmongers. They trick K9 by worshipping him as their saviour, a veritable God. Darius sees through the plan and tries to thwart the alien invasion.
11	"Oroborus"	Daniel Nettheim	Deborah Parsons	22 March 2010	25 April 2010	12 June 2010	142817-11
K9 notices a change of behaviour within his group of friends and discovers that time itself is being disrupted. Small chunks of time are being "eaten away". A "Time Snake" has invaded, and Starkey makes a discovery that means that only he alone can face the Oroborus and offer himself up as a meal to defeat the creature.
12	"Alien Avatar"	Karl Zwicky	Graeme Farmer	29 March 2010	1 May 2010	23 June 2010	142817-12
Following The Thames being heavily polluted by an alien chemical, K9 discovers the alien "Medes" are imprisoned by Drake and they need a special "key" to be made for the release of their spaceship.
13	"Aeolian"	Karl Zwicky	Dave Warner	5 April 2010	2 May 2010	26 June 2010	142817-13
London is being bombarded by strange sound waves that cause mass panic. K9 and Starkey are on the trail of the Alien, identified by Gryffen as an Aeolian. Darius desperately tries to rescue Jorjie as she is trapped by falling debris.
14	"The Last Oak Tree"	Dale Bradley	Jim Noble	12 April 2010	8 May 2010	3 July 2010	142817-14
Panic ensues when a museum exhibit is stolen and K9, Starkey, Darius and Jorjie are on the trail of the culprit only to find a giant menace hiding in London’s abandoned sewers. However, is the Alien really a threat or is Drake the bigger evil?
15	"Black Hunger"	James Bogle	Chris Roache	19 April 2010	9 May 2010	10 July 2010	142817-15
The Department are using an experimental device that literally eats rubbish. Darius sees an opportunity to make some money and snatches the device. However, the alien virus in the device escapes and threatens to devour everything it touches.
16	"The Cambridge Spy"	Mark DeFriest	Jason Bourque	26 April 2010	15 May 2010	17 July 2010	142817-16
A freak accident engages the STM, and Jorjie is taken back in time to 23 November 1963. K9 and Starkey follow to rescue her and become embroiled in a spy-ring and a race against time to save Darius from never having existed.
17	"Lost Library of Ukko"	Mark DeFriest	Deborah Parsons	3 May 2010	16 May 2010	24 July 2010	142817-17
Inspector Thorne sets a trap for K9 and Starkey is whisked away to a far-off planet all contained within an alien library card. The Librarian arrives to reclaim the card, and K9 and friends need June’s help to rescue Starkey and teach Thorne a lesson.
18	"Mutant Copper"	James Bogle	John O'Brien	10 May 2010	22 May 2010	31 July 2010	142817-18
The CCPC’s are hunting a rogue officer who has developed a personality and consciousness. K9, Starkey and Jorjie take the rogue CCPC back to Gryffen’s mansion and hide him from The Department, only to face the mutant copper causing mayhem.
19	"The Custodians"	James Bogle	Shayne Armstrong; S.P. Krause	17 May 2010	23 May 2010	7 August 2010	142817-19
"Little Green Men" is a new virtual reality game that is sweeping the nation. However, it has a hidden secret. It has a link to an Alien that turns humans into his own kind. K9 and Starkey race to save Darius and Jorjie from being turned into scaly green creatures.
20	"Taphony and the Time Loop"	Mark DeFriest	Shayne Armstrong & S.P. Krause (story); Anthony Morris & Graeme Farmer	24 May 2010	2 October 2010	14 August 2010	142817-20
Gryffen tries to free a time being imprisoned by The Department. He was responsible for an experiment that bought the "Time Blank" into being and K9 assists him in his plan. Unfortunately, the Blank, in the guise of a girl (Taphony), turns on Gryffen and begins to drain Jorjie's life force in an attempt to stabilise her existence. Guest stars Maia Mitchell as Taphony.
21	"Robot Gladiators"	James Bogle	Jim Noble	31 May 2010	16 October 2010	21 August 2010	142817-21
Darius and K9 go undercover to expose a criminal who is using illegal robot technology in what he calls "destruct-ertainment". K9 becomes a Gladiator and has to face the evil "pain-maker" in a battle to the death. But what is the sinister secret plan instigated by Thorne?
22	"Mind Snap"	David Napier	Bob Baker; Paul Tams	7 June 2010	23 October 2010	28 August 2010	142817-22
K9 is using the STM to try and rectify his memory loss of events prior to his arrival and regeneration. Gryffen and Starkey discover him linked to the machine, which creates a feed-back, and K9 loses all control of his memory and programming. He becomes a danger to everyone and starts his self-destruct programme.
23	"Angel of The North"	James Bogle	Bob Baker	14 June 2010	30 October 2010	4 September 2010	142817-23
Gryffen is taken by Thorne in a special VR encasement suit to the crash site of the "Fallen Angel", the spaceship that the STM was taken from. In the frozen wastes of Canada, Gryffen faces his own demons and the dreaded Korven. K9 and Starkey try to rescue Gryffen from this most evil of alien menaces.
24	"The Last Precinct"	James Bogle	Shayne Armstrong; S.P. Krause	21 June 2010	6 November 2010	11 September 2010	142817-24
A vigilante group of former police officers discover that the Department are upgrading the CCPC’s with Alien tech, and make a stand by holding Gryffen hostage. K9 and Starkey battle the intruders whilst Darius faces up to his past.
25	"Hound of the Korven"	Mark DeFriest	Shayne Armstrong; S.P. Krause	28 June 2010	13 November 2010	18 September 2010	142817-25
Thorne entices K9 to hand over his regeneration disc in exchange for his missing memory chip. As a double cross, the fake chip contains a sequence turning K9 into a bomb. Starkey is taken by a Jixen who has a few surprises for K9 and friends too.
26	"The Eclipse of the Korven"	David Napier	Shayne Armstrong; S.P. Krause	5 July 2010	20 November 2010	25 September 2010	142817-26
A strange phenomenon occurs in the STM that heralds the imminent arrival of a Korven invasion. Thorne is plotting to help them and has as his back-up a sinister giant creature that has K9’s regeneration disc implanted making it an indestructible weapon. K9 faces his biggest threat ever.

== Casting ==
John Leeson reprises his role as the voice of K9. Sixteen-year-old Brisbane native Philippa Coulthard plays Jorjie Turner, a rebellious 15-year-old whose mother works for the mysterious "Department". 20-year-old Keegan Joyce plays Starkey, a 14-year-old orphan rebel; and 21-year-old Daniel Webber plays Darius Pike, an assistant to Professor Gryffen, who is played by Canadian character actor Robert Moloney. Recurring cast members include Robyn Moore as Jorjie's mother June Turner, and Connor Van Vuuren as Inspector Drake, later replaced by Jared Robinsen as Inspector Thorne.

== Cast ==
- John Leeson as K9
- Philippa Coulthard as Jorjie Turner
- Keegan Joyce as Starkey
- Daniel Webber as Darius Pike
- Robert Moloney as Alistair Gryffen
- Robyn Moore as June Turner, Jorjie's mother
- Connor Van Vuuren as Drake
- Jared Robinsen as Thorne

== Broadcast ==
The first episode aired as a sneak preview of the series on Halloween 2009 on satellite channel Disney XD in the UK & Ireland. The full series later aired on Network Ten in Australia, Disney XD in the UK & Ireland, Scandinavia, Poland, Italy and The Netherlands; and Disney Channel CEE in Bulgaria, Romania, Moldova, Slovakia, Hungary and the Czech Republic. It was subsequently syndicated around the globe, including on Channel 5 in the UK and on Cartoon Network in New Zealand. In the UK, Channel 5 broadcast the first series between December 2010 and April 2011. The US cable channel Syfy began airing the series on 25 December 2012, initially by broadcasting the entire first series in an all-day marathon.

Country / Region	Network(s)	Premiere
United Kingdom, Ireland	Disney XD (UK & Ireland); Channel 5	(Disney Original Run) 31 October 2009 (Episode 1) (Disney Original Run) 3 April 2010 (Full Series) (Channel 5 UK premiere) 18 December 2010 (Full Series)
Scandinavia	Disney XD Scandinavia	11 January 2010
Turkey	Disney XD (Turkey)	6 February 2010
Poland	Disney XD (Poland)	6 February 2010
Bulgaria; Romania; Moldova; Slovakia; Czech Republic; Hungary	Disney Channel CEE	6 February 2010 (double episode)
Australia	Network Ten; Cartoon Network	3 April 2010
Italy	Disney XD	May 2010
Netherlands	Disney XD	2 June 2010
France	RMC Découverte	September 2011
Russia	Carousel	3 September 2011
Japan	Channel Ginga	February 2012
Canada	BBC Kids	4 October 2012
United States	Syfy	25 December 2012

== Home media ==
Series	Release name	# of discs	Region 4 (Australia)	Region 2 (UK)	Region 1 (US)	Notes
1	The Complete First Series	4	27 September 2010	11 December 2010 (DW Shop Exclusive)	—N/a	Contains the Complete Series 1, Episodes 1-26 and UK Limited Edition is signed.
1	The Bounty Hunter	1	27 September 2010	—N/a	—N/a	Contains Series 1, Episodes 1-6
1	Alien Avatar	1	1 December 2010	—N/a	—N/a	Contains Series 1, Episodes 7-12
1	Series 1; Volume 1	2	—N/a	31 January 2011	—N/a	Contains Series 1, Episodes 1–12.
1	Series 1; Volume 2	2	—N/a	18 April 2011	—N/a	Contains Series 1, Episodes 13–26.
1	Ultimate Collectors Edition	4	—N/a	11 June 2012	—N/a	Contains the Complete Series 1, Episodes 1-26
1	The Complete Series	4	—N/a	—N/a	7 May 2013	Contains the Complete Series 1, Episodes 1-26 plus two extras, "The Making of K9" and "Interview with K9"

== Merchandise ==
K9 Mark 2 figurines were sold on the official K9 website. Tie-in books titled The Complete Book of K9 and The K9 Storybook were announced on the official website but went unreleased. The Essential Book of K9, a hardback book that follows the story of K9 through all four models, crossing over from Doctor Who, K-9 & Company, The Sarah Jane Adventures, and K9, was released in 2015. It also included original short stories and a comic.

In 2019, Obverse Books published the third in their Time's Mosaic series of guidebooks to Doctor Who by Finn Clark, in part covering the K9 Television series and associated spin-offs.

== Awards ==
In 2009, Shayne Armstrong and SP Krause, writers and developers of the series for television, won the John Hinde Award for Excellence in Science-Fiction Writing at the Australian Writers Guild AWGIEs for their script for the episode "The Fall of the House of Gryffen". The episode was also a nominee in the category for Best Children's Television in that year.

In 2009, Shayne Armstrong and SP Krause were also nominated as finalists in the Queensland Premier's Literary Awards for Best Television Script for the episode "Regeneration".

In 2010, Tony O'Loughlan, director of photography for the show, won two bronze awards at the Queensland and Northern Territory Cinematographer Awards for his work on the episodes Angel of the North and The Eclipse of the Korven.

Series VFX Director and Director of four other episodes, David Napier, was nominated for "Best Direction in Children's Television" at the 2010 Australian Directors' Guild Awards (AWGIES) for episode 26, "Eclipse of the Korven".

== Proposed further series and film ==
The show's creators stated that a second series was in development. A new design of K9 for series 2 was scheduled to be unveiled by Bob Baker and Paul Tams at the Who Shop on 27 July 2013. Bob Baker told an interviewer in 2014, "Paul and I are in process of getting another series going. Hope it doesn’t take another eleven years!". Paul Tams revealed on a Kickstarter page for his proposed Marti series that he and Baker are sitting out a protracted production deal before bringing back the series in a reboot titled K9 Adventures. In April 2016, Bob Baker stated in an interview posted on K9 OFFICIAL PAGE on Facebook that the TV series will not continue and they will for now just focus on the TimeQuake film.

On 24 October 2015, Bob Baker and Paul Tams announced the film K9: TimeQuake which was destined for cinemas in 2017 and was to feature the robot dog facing off against classic Doctor Who villain Omega in deep space. Despite the film not materialising, it was announced on 9 September 2018 that "a new multi million dollar series" was in development under partnership with "a major US/UK company" prior to the release of the feature film. On 20 December 2020 'Megabytes', an anthology featuring K9, was released which was teased as being "the road to TimeQuake". When Bob Baker died in November 2021, the official Twitter page released a statement "Bob had recently completed scripts for both a new K9 Film and TV series, which will continue in tribute to Bob and his legacy," but as of 2023 this was the final message posted on the account and there is no other information available to suggest the project is still active.
