= Felicity Mason =

Australian actress, writer and visual artist

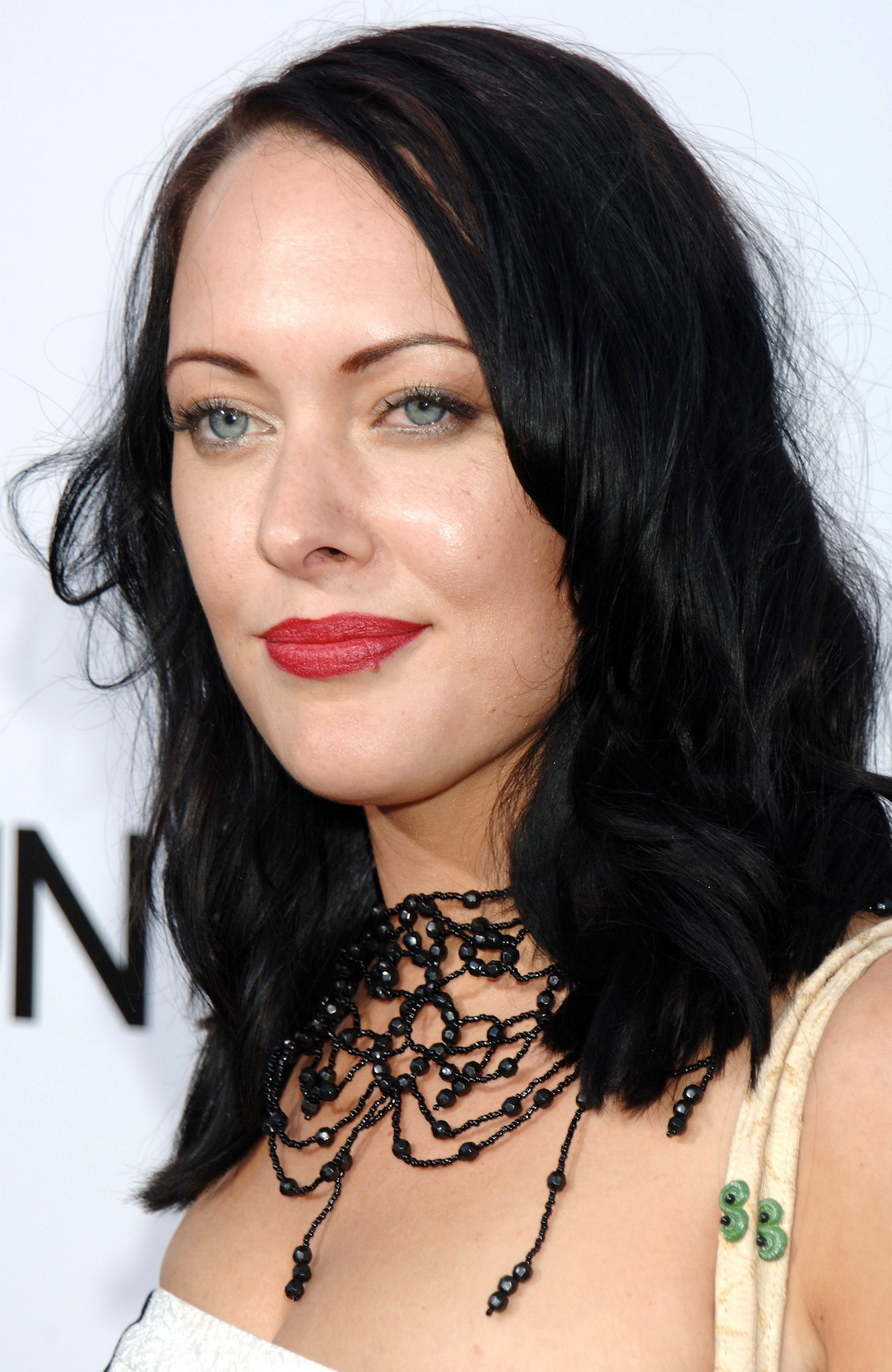
- Born: Felicity Mason; 1976 (age 49–50); Sydney, New South Wales, Australia
- Occupations: Actress, artist, writer

Felicity Mason (born 1976) is an Australian actress, writer and visual artist living in New York.

She has starred in four major film roles. In 2020, Felicity starred as Diana in Stalkers Prey 2 (Lifetime). Zombie movie fans will recognise her as the star of the internationally acclaimed Cult Film Undead (Lionsgate Films). She was the first Australian actress to star in a Sandalwood film titled Hollywood (Ramu Films); in it she was required to dance, act and sing entirely in the Indian language – Kannada. On TV you may have seen her in the series Mortified (ABC), or The Sleepover Club (Nickelodeon). In 2005 Felicity moved to New York. Within a year she landed a contract with NBC Universal for a comedy series she wrote titled Oralick Records (NBC Universal); in it she plays four off-beat characters competing for a record deal. During that time she was signed to Untitled Entertainment. By 2008 Felicity quit acting to complete her Visual Arts degree. In 2012, Mason graduated with a Bachelor of Fine Arts from The Queensland University of Technology.

To date Felicity's body of work includes film, theatre, TV, musicals, documentaries, corporate and music videos, and cartoon voice characterization.

== Early life ==
Born in Sydney, Australia, to father William James Mason and Finnish mother Marja-Leena Malinen, Felicity's interests led to acting when she first performed, at age 10, at Pymble Theatre, Sydney as the child actress of the production MacAarthur House. During early childhood Felicity's family performed in amateur theatre; both her mother, father, aunt, uncle and grandparents all performed in various theatre productions at Fairfield Players, with her mother Leena co-writing and directing a play based on the history of Fairfield City. In 1988, Felicity relocated from Sydney to Queensland.

At age 15, Felicity was approached and signed by a talent agent. In 1996 Felicity joined June Dally Watkins, and later Vivien's model agencies. She has appeared in over 30 television and print ad campaigns including Triumph Bra's, Mercedes, Mazda, and Seiko watches to name a few.

In 1999 Felicity joined The Actors' Workshop and later graduated with an associate diploma of acting. She then studied screen acting at NIDA University, Sydney, and HB Studio in New York.

== Art ==
In addition to acting, Felicity is a private art broker and visual artist. Felicity was trained (to paint in oils) by her grandfather: Veikko Malinen, founder of the Finnish Art Society in Kotka, Finland. Her mother Marja-Leena Malienen was an entomologist, and retired to become a full-time artist, painting predominantly land and seascapes.

In 2005 Felicity held a solo art exhibition "Chelsea a Mixed Bag" at Fox Gallery, Brisbane The show was a sell-out attracting over 400 guests, the largest attendance for the gallery. In 2008 Mason held a one night only art exhibition titled "The Election Show" at a private venue in Soho, NYC.

By 2008 Felicity quit acting (for 13 years) to pursue her love of art, and complete her Visual Arts degree. In 2012, Mason graduated with a Bachelor of Fine Arts from The Queensland University of Technology. In 2010, Mason wrote and filmed "ShockArt". In 2012 she created "Art TV " a series that interviews established and emerging visual artists. Mason also attended The Arts Students League in New York city.

In 2021 Felicity is a contributing editor and host for NftyGuide, a site that covers NFTs in the Art and Collectables market.

== Filmography ==
- A Predator's Obsession: Stalker's Prey 2 (2020) as Diana
- Oralick Records (2011) as Manisha, Jenna, Polly, Kentucky
- Shock Art (2010) as Artist
- The Sleepover Club (2003) TV series as Maya
- Undead (2003) as Rene
- Hollywood (2002) as Manisha
- Dark Water (2002) as Fantasy
- Mortified (2006) as Mrs Palmer
- Brizbin Boy Canberra Girl (2002)

== See also ==
- Cinema of Australia
