= Secrets & Lies (Australian TV series) =

- Genre: Drama; Detective fiction Mystery; Crime; Psychological thriller
- Created by: Stephen M. Irwin
- Written by: Stephen M. Irwin; Lucas Taylor; Kylie Needham
- Directed by: Kate Dennis; Peter Salmon
- Starring: Martin Henderson; Anthony Hayes; Diana Glenn; Adrienne Pickering; Philippa Coulthard; Piper Morrissey; Damon Gameau; Hunter Stratton Boland
- Country of origin: Australia
- Original language: English
- No. of seasons: 1
- No. of episodes: 6

Production
- Producers: Tracey Robertson; Leigh McGrath
- Production locations: Ashgrove, Brisbane, Australia
- Running time: 48 minutes
- Production company: Hoodlum Entertainment

Original release
- Network: Network Ten
- Release: 3 March – 7 April 2014

Related
- Secrets and Lies (US)

Secrets & Lies is an Australian drama television series that first screened on Network Ten on 3 March 2014, and was subsequently aired in other countries. It was filmed in Brisbane, Queensland. When originally broadcast, an associated website simultaneously published additional "clues" — images and video clips — evidential material and records of interviews from the fictional world of the story. In the DVD issue, these items are reproduced as "extras" with the relevant chapters.

== Plot ==
The series follows the story of a family man who finds the body of a young boy and quickly becomes the prime suspect in his murder. It emerges fairly early that the boy was his son from an extra-marital affair which is not quite over; the weapon used was an up-market torch (US:flashlight) identical to one he owns but can no longer locate. He cannot account for his movements, his wife has good reason to be suspicious of him; his elder daughter, who is attracted to a disreputable boy, is distant; only his wilful younger daughter is loyal, but consequently disrespectful of her mother. Not content to let the police do their work, and becoming increasingly frustrated at being questioned repeatedly, he tries to prove his innocence but only makes matters worse, goaded on by a well-meaning but obtuse fellow-tradesman. The film is set in Brisbane, South East Queensland, with its characteristic tropical architecture and weather, laissez-faire attitude to security and vast swathes of bushland. It is set at Christmas time, but apart from an indoor Christmas tree and decorations, some gift-giving and parties, this is given little prominence.

== Cast ==
=== Main ===
- Martin Henderson as Ben Gundelach
- Anthony Hayes as Detective Ian Cornielle
- Diana Glenn as Christy Gundelach
- Adrienne Pickering as Jess Murnane
- Philippa Coulthard as Tasha Gundelach
- Piper Morrissey as Eva Gundelach
- Damon Gameau as Dave Carroll
- Hunter Stratton Boland as Thom Murnane

=== Recurring and guest ===
- Mouche Phillips as Vanessa Turner
- Damien Garvey as Stuart Haire
- Steven Tandy as Kevin Gresham
- Barbara Lowing as Elaine Gresham
- Hugh Parker as Dr Tim Turner
- Ben Lawson as Paul Murnane
- Mirrah Foulkes as Nicole

== Episodes ==
No. overall	No. in season	Title	Directed by	Written by	Original release date	Australian viewers
1	1	"Episode 1"	Kate Dennis	Stephen M. Irwin	3 March 2014	0.404
Ben Gundelach's life is turned upside down when he discovers the body of four-year-old Thom Murnane in the woods near his home. Ben finds himself struggling with his home and professional lives when the case receives national attention and the media portray him as guilty before the police even rule the death as suspicious.
2	2	"Episode 2"	Kate Dennis	Stephen M. Irwin & Lucas Taylor	10 March 2014	0.365
Ben struggles to prove his innocence when the police identify the murder weapon as a flashlight the same as one he owns but cannot find. As he tries to help Jess Murnane deal with her son's death, he comes to the horrifying realisation that his own daughter might have been involved.
3	3	"Episode 3"	Kate Dennis	Lucas Taylor, Kylie Needham & Stephen M. Irwin	17 March 2014	0.317
When the media circus lose interest in Thom Murnane's case, and the police investigation moves away from him, Ben hopes his life can return to normal – but the revelation that he was Thom's biological father brings tensions in the Gundelach home to a head. When the only other suspect has an alibi, Ben finds a key piece of evidence that could prove him innocent – and makes a mistake that could seal his guilt.
4	4	"Episode 4"	Peter Salmon	Lucas Taylor, Kylie Needham & Stephen M. Irwin	24 March 2014	0.278
Now in possession of the murder weapon, Ben tries to return to a normal life until he can safely get rid of it. By chance, he stumbles onto evidence of a sexual predator living on his street, and, finally convinced that he knows who killed Thom, he takes the opportunity to dispose of the weapon. But, in his haste, his wife catches him getting rid of the evidence.
5	5	"Episode 5"	Peter Salmon	Stephen M. Irwin & Lucas Taylor	31 March 2014	0.316
When Christy uses Tasha and Eva to hold their relationship hostage, Ben turns to Jess for comfort. But the relationship turns sour when Ben finds evidence implicating her in Thom's death.
6	6	"Episode 6"	Peter Salmon	Stephen M. Irwin & Lucas Taylor	7 April 2014	0.413
Eva disappears without warning, and in desperation, Ben accuses Jess of taking her. Jess responds by accusing him of sexual assault. He is detained, but set free again after the police find the blue jacket in Jess' house. The next morning, he walks into Eva's cabin, where he finds the final piece of evidence to identify the killer: Eva. In the interview room with Cornielle, Eva displays a cold emotionless front indicative of a sociopath as it is revealed, through a series of flashbacks, that she overheard her parents arguing about Ben's affair with Jess. Fearing it would tear them apart (and her father would leave – a common obsession she displayed throughout the series), Eva planned to drown Thom in a river in the hopes that Jess would leave their street for good; when it rained and Thom wanted to go home she couldn't get him to the river and instead used the torch to kill him. She revealed that her attempts to hide the evidence wasn't to frame her father but to frame Jess. Back in the interview room she says "sorry" explaining none of this would've happened if she had got him to the river. Christy (who is now seen to have been in the room) blurts out crying; Ben watches from behind the mirror as his little girl is charged with her own half-brother's murder, then he's driven home by Cornielle who tells him to take care. Ben stands in the kitchen staring at a photo of himself and Eva when Tasha takes his hand and the two hug.

== Release ==
The series first screened on Network Ten on 3 March 2014.

It aired in the Republic of Ireland on RTÉ TWO HD from 30 March 2014, and in Canada on the CBC in July 2014. It premiered in the Netherlands on RTL 4 on 24 August 2014. Started in the UK on 23 September 2014 on Channel 5 and in France from 26 January to 2 February 2015 on France2.

It has also aired on SVT (Sweden), TV2 (Norway), Vitaya (Belgium), as well as Netflix in both Canada and the U.S.

== Reception ==
Secrets and Lies has been acclaimed by critics and audiences. Denette Wilford of The Huffington Post has stated: "As for Secrets & Lies, so much great stuff is happening on this show – the writing, the directing and the acting; it manages to be completely authentic without trying too hard. It's riveting stuff, from the whodunit aspect to the family crap the Gundelachs are facing, which everyone can relate to." Lucy Mangan from The Guardian wrote in a review of the series; "Yes, we have seen its like before, in Broadchurch, but the opener more than holds its own against ITV's surprise hit." Many other critics have praised the performances, writing and direction of the series.

=== Awards and nominations ===
Year	Award	Category	Nominee	Result
2015	AACTA Awards	Best Telefeature or Mini Series	Secrets & Lies	Nominated
2015	AACTA Awards	Best Guest or Supporting Actress in a Television Drama	Piper Morrissey	Nominated
2015	Logie Awards	Most Outstanding Actor	Martin Henderson	Nominated
2015	Golden Nymph Awards	Best Miniseries	Secrets & Lies	Nominated
2015	Golden Nymph Awards	Best Actor in a Miniseries	Anthony Hayes	Won

== U.S. version ==
On 4 February 2014, the production company behind this version announced that a US version with the same title was in the works for ABC and would be co-produced with ABC Studios with a series penalty if the project is held back or not greenlighted by the network. The series premiered in the U.S. on 1 March 2015. Ryan Phillippe stars in this adaptation. On May 7, 2015, the series was renewed for a second season, which premiered on September 25, 2016.

A loose Philippine adaptation was to be released in 2024 on Sari Sari Channel. Meryll Soriano and Baron Geisler were to star in this adaptation.
