= The Actors Workshop (Australia) =

Drama School in Brisbane, Australia

The Actors Workshop Australia
- Trade name: The Actors Workshop Australia Pty Ltd
- Type: Drama school
- Traded as: The Actors Workshop
- Industry: Film, Television and Theatre
- Founded: 1994 - 2018
- Founder: Lyn Kidd and Michael Caton
- Headquarters: Brisbane, Australia

The Actors Workshop was a private professional acting school in Brisbane, Australia. Its teaching style is influenced by Stanislavski's system and Stella Adler's interpretation, in addition to The Psychology of Character developed by Lyn Kidd.

== History ==
It was founded on 6 October 1994 by acting teacher Lyn Kidd and Australian actor Michael Caton.

The first premises was leased from theatrical agent Stacey Testro in Fortitude Valley. Classes commenced in voice, technique and camera. In 1996 the school relocated into the Metro Arts building in Edward Street, Brisbane CBD. The curriculum was expanded to include physical training in the form of improvisation, movement and stage combat. Kidd also extended the acting technique program by adding Character to the existing Script Analysis subjects. In doing so, Kidd had developed her technique into the program she named The Psychology of Character.

In 1999, the school's curriculum was accredited as an Advanced Diploma of Film, Television and Theatre Acting, under the Australian Qualifications Framework (AQF). The Diploma of Film and Television Acting and a Certificate IV in Film and Television Acting were housed within the Advanced Diploma curriculum. It was the first qualification to incorporate equal, dedicated training streams to both the live and camera medium, for the entire two years full time training strategy. Also in 2000, the school received Registered Training Organisation (RTO) status, as nationally regulated by the Australian Skills Quality Authority (ASQA).

In 2001, The Actors Workshop moved to the heritage listed Foresters Hall in Trinity Lane, Woolloongabba and commenced delivery of the Advanced Diploma, Diploma and Certificate IV qualifications to full-time students. Kidd continued running The Actors Workshop and the delivery of these qualifications until her retirement in 2018.

== School's Philosophy ==
The artist is a continual student, learning from the experiences of life. This allows the artist to contribute to society, by reflecting a creative awareness back into their community. A community that embraces creativity has a higher potential for a fulfilling, prosperous and compassionate future.

A maximum of fourteen full-time students attended twenty-eight hours of studio based training a week, forty weeks a year, over two years. In addition, the course included up to 20 hours a week in homework, production rehearsal and work experience requirements.

Complete list of courses offered:

- Advanced Diploma of Film, Television and Theatre Acting
- Diploma of Film Television Acting
- Certificate IV Film and Television Acting, and
- The Psychology of Character (Pre-accreditation)

== Legacy ==
The school earned a reputation for Lyn Kidd's generosity, integrity and commitment to her students. The school instilled in the actors an accountability towards adherence, respect and dedication to their craft. The Actors Workshop was known for creating a safe space for the personal, professional and creative growth of actors, whilst also welcoming and nurturing the wider creative industry.

The school dedicated a great deal of time in supporting casting calls Australia-wide, particularly in South East Queensland. Students benefited from the school's collaboration with film and television schools and universities as well as production companies Australia wide.

== Community service ==
The Actors Workshop was committed to community service. Kidd supported South East Queensland community-based organisations and government services by supplying students and alumni to participate in role play based training programs.

== Awards and accolades ==
The Actors Workshop received several industry, education and community service awards. In addition, numerous alumni and emergent filmmakers associated with the school have received award recognition for their work supported by Lyn Kidd.

Select list of awards won by The Actors Workshop:

Year	Title	Notes
2003	Community Service Award	Presented by Queensland Emergency Services Commissioner, in recognition of Excellence through Education and contributions made to the assessment strategies of community training organisations of Queensland Ambulance's QAS Education Centre.
2004	Kinetone Award	Lyn Kidd was the first female to receive the Kinetone Award, The Queensland New Filmmakers Awards (QNFA), in recognition of significant contribution to film and television in Queensland particularly with the mentoring of young filmmakers.
2004	QTA Queensland Training Awards STATE WINNER	Australia Council for Private Education and Training Small Training Provider of the Year Award. Presented to The Actors Workshop. Awarded by Tom Barton MP, Minister for Employment, Training and Industrial Relations, Queensland Government.
2004	QTA Queensland Training Awards STATE FINALIST	
