= Lyn Kidd =

Australian voice and acting teacher

- Born: 1952 (age 73–74); Brisbane, Australia
- Occupations: Speech and Drama Teacher Voice and Acting Teacher Proprietor/Owner Author
- Years active: 1975–present
- Known for: Acting Technique The Psychology of Character Founder The Actors Workshop Author The Jungle of Sounds

Lyn Kidd (born 1952) is an Australian teacher of acting, voice and character technique. Author of The Jungle of Sounds, Kidd is also the founder and principal of The Actors Workshop, Brisbane Australia.

== Early life ==
Lyn Kidd is from Gladstone.

== Education ==
Lyn spent her early adult years in Sydney, Australia where she studied Speech and Drama from 1975 to 1980 with Dorothy Goldie at Bellevue Hill, New South Wales. Lyn completed the requirements for an Associate Diploma of Speech and Drama through the Australian Music Examinations Board. She began delivering workshops for children at various schools around Sydney.

Lyn witnessed Stella Adler at the Bondi Pavilion Theatre during her 1976 workshop in Sydney organised by the Peter Summerton Foundation. After the completion of her Speech and Drama qualification she sought out teachers who taught the Stella Adler technique, itself an interpretation of Stanislavski's System.

In 1980 Cleo magazine's fashion editor Rosena O'Casey and assistant Deborah Franco informed Kidd about Jone Winchester (also known as Joan Winchester) and Brian Syron running masterclasses in Stella Adler technique. Thus, Kidd studied under the tutelage of Jone Winchester and Brian Syron at The Actors Masterclass, Edgecliff, Sydney. She then continued for a further two years at the Spare Parts Studio privately with Jone Winchester.

Jone Winchester as president and founding member of the Peter Summerton Foundation recommended to the board that Lyn Kidd be awarded scholarships in 1982 and 1983 as assistant to international master teacher and director Yevgeny Lanskoy.

In 1984, Lyn was again awarded the Peter Summerton Foundation Scholarship to be assistant to master voice teacher Rowena Balos. In 1985, Lyn was awarded the Publishing and Broadcasting Film Company Ltd (PBL) scholarship to study film and television technique in Sydney with American teachers/actors Rae Allen and Bibi Besch.

== The Jungle of Sounds ==
The Jungle of Sounds, front cover

Kidd commenced to write an educational book for children shaped by her experience with dyslexia. Her idea was to incorporate Australian animal vocalisations for the pronunciation of each consonant sound. The research of bird sounds was conducted between 1988 and 1990 at Natural Bridge in the Numinbah Valley with the assistance and guidance of Peter Lehmann, ranger at the National Parks and Wildlife Services Queensland.

Kidd traveled to America in 1991 where she began co-writing with Rowena Balos. Over the following two years, Kidd and Rowena continued drafting and subsequently, The Jungle of Sounds - A Journey Through The Magic of Language was published in 1997 by Antipodean Educational Press.

== The Psychology of Character ==
Lyn created The Psychology of Character as an acting technique whilst living at Natural Bridge researching The Jungle of Sounds. Over a period of three years she attended therapy class with intent of learning and exploring the aspects of human character. What become apparent during the sessions was character understanding and development, which would be utilised by the actor.

The Psychology of Character as an acting technique laid the foundation of core teachings for The Actors Workshop, which she opened in 1994 with co-founder Michael Caton. In 1999, the course curriculum of The Actors Workshop was accredited through the Australian Qualifications Framework as an Advanced Diploma of Film, Television and Theatre Acting.

== Awards ==
Lyn has worked with writers, directors, producers, filmmakers and the Queensland community sector.

Year	Title	Notes
2003	Community Service Award	Presented by Queensland Emergency Services Commissioner, in recognition of Excellence through Education and contributions made to the assessment strategies of community training organisations of Queensland Ambulance's QAS Education Centre.
2004	Kinetone Award	Presented by Anna Bligh then, Queensland Education and Arts Minister at the 18th Annual Warner Roadshow Studios Queensland New Film Makers Award in recognition of significant contribution to film and television in Queensland particularly with the mentoring of young filmmakers. First female recipient.
2009	Media Mates Award	Contribution to Southside TAFE Screen and Media School.
