= The Spierig Brothers =

Film directors

- Other name: Spierig Brothers
- Occupations: Film directors, screenwriters, film producers
- Years active: 2000–present

Identical twin brothers Peter Spierig and Michael Spierig (/ˈspiːrɪɡ/), known collectively as the Spierig Brothers, are German-Australian film directors, producers, and screenwriters. They are best known for their 2014 sci-fi thriller, Predestination, and the 2007 vampire action-thriller, Daybreakers.

== Film career ==
Peter and Michael made their directing debut in 2003 with Undead, a low-budget zombie horror-comedy film, after they agreed on pooling together their life savings. It won a prize for Best Visual Effects at the Australian Film Institute Awards, and screened at 17 film festivals, including Edinburgh, Montreal, Toronto, Sitges, Berlin, Amsterdam and Puchon. At the Melbourne International Film Festival, the International Federation of Film Critics awarded Undead the prestigious FIPRESCI Award. The film was sold to 41 countries, and was released in the US and Canada by Lions Gate Entertainment, who developed a close relationship with Peter and Michael, and backed their second film, Daybreakers.

Daybreakers (2010) starred four-time Academy Award nominee Ethan Hawke, four-time Academy Award nominee Willem Dafoe, Sam Neill, Claudia Karvan, Vince Colosimo, Michael Dorman, and Isabel Lucas. The film was released in the United States on 2,500 screens in January 2010.

The Spierig brothers' third film was the action sci-fi thriller Predestination based on the 1959 science fiction short story '"—All You Zombies—" by Robert A. Heinlein. The film stars Ethan Hawke and Sarah Snook, and includes an appearance by Noah Taylor. The story recounts that of a detective from a covert government agency (Hawke) who embarks on an intricate series of time-travel journeys in order to catch a master criminal and ensure his own existence. The film was co-written and co-directed by the twins, and was filmed in Australia during Spring of 2013. After its premiere at SXSW on 8 March 2014, the film received many positive reviews including Variety, The Guardian, and IGN Movies.

The two directed the eighth Saw film, Jigsaw, which was released on 27 October 2017. Their next film was Winchester: The House That Ghosts Built, a horror film about the Winchester Mystery House, starring Helen Mirren as heiress Sarah Winchester, and released on 2 February 2018. "Jigsaw" grossed $102,952,888 worldwide. "Winchester" grossed a worldwide total of $46 million on a budget of $3.5 million.

== Filmography ==
Year	Title	Director	Writer	Producer	Notes
2000	The Big Picture	Yes	Yes	Yes	Short film
2003	Undead	Yes	Yes	Yes	Also editors, visual effects supervisors and sound designers
2009	Daybreakers	Yes	Yes	No	Also visual effects supervisors
2014	Predestination	Yes	Yes	Yes	Also visual effects supervisors and music composer (Composed by Peter Spierig)
2017	Jigsaw	Yes	No	No	
2018	Winchester	Yes	Yes	No	Also music composer (Composed by Peter Spierig)
2026	Fall 2: Deadpoint	Yes	No	No	
2027	Headless	Yes	No	No	

== Awards and nominations ==
Predestination won the 2014 John Hinde Award for Excellence in Science-Fiction Writing.

AACTA Awards

Year	Nominated work	Category	Result
2015	Predestination	Best Film	Nominated
2015	Predestination	Best Direction	Nominated
2015	Predestination	Best Adapted Screenplay	Nominated
2015	Predestination	Best Original Music Score	Nominated

Australian Film Institute Awards

Year	Nominated work	Category	Result
2010	Daybreakers	Best Visual Effects	Won

International Federation of Film Critics

Year	Nominated work	Category	Result
2003	Undead	Fipresci Award	Won

Toronto After Dark Film Festival

Year	Nominated work	Category	Result
2014	Predestination	Special Award for Best Sci-Fi Film	Won
2014	Predestination	Special Award for Best Screenplay	Won
2014	Predestination	Audience Award for Best Feature Film	2nd Place
