= Daybreakers =

2009 film by the Spierig brothers

- Theatrical release poster
- Directed by: The Spierig Brothers
- Written by: The Spierig Brothers
- Produced by: Chris Brown; Sean Furst; Bryan Furst
- Starring: Ethan Hawke; Willem Dafoe; Claudia Karvan; Michael Dorman; Sam Neill; Vince Colosimo; Isabel Lucas
- Cinematography: Ben Nott
- Edited by: Matt Villa
- Music by: Christopher Gordon
- Production companies: Lionsgate; Pictures in Paradise; Pacific Film and Television Commission; Furst Films
- Distributed by: Lionsgate (United States); Hoyts Distribution (Australia)
- Release dates: September 11, 2009 (TIFF); January 8, 2010 (United States); February 4, 2010 (Australia)
- Running time: 98 minutes
- Countries: United States; Australia
- Language: English
- Budget: $20 million
- Box office: $51.4 million

Daybreakers is a 2009 dystopian science fiction action-horror vampire film written and directed by Michael and Peter Spierig. The film takes place in a futuristic world overrun by vampires, and centers around a vampiric corporation which sets out to capture and farm the remaining humans while researching a substitute for human blood. Ethan Hawke plays vampire hematologist Edward Dalton, whose work is interrupted by human survivors led by former vampire 'Elvis' (Willem Dafoe), who has a cure that can save the human species.

An international co-production between the United States and Australia, Daybreakers premiered at the Toronto International Film Festival in 2009. It was released in the United Kingdom on 6 January 2010 and in North America on 8 January 2010. The film grossed over $50 million worldwide (from a $20 million budget) and received mixed-to-positive critical reception.

== Plot ==
In the year 2019, a global plague caused by an infected vampire bat has transformed most of the world's human population into immortal vampires. As the population of uninfected humans decreases, vampires are faced with a severe blood shortage, with those deprived of blood degenerating into bestial monsters called "subsiders". Because sunlight is deadly to vampires, the vampires are active during the night, and use underground passages and UV-filtered cars for daytime travel.

Humans are captured and kept alive for their blood while scientists search for a synthetic blood substitute. Edward Dalton is the head hematologist for Bromley Marks, the largest corporate supplier of human blood. With his colleague Christopher Caruso, they work to develop a blood substitute, which they test on soldiers in the vampiric national army. Powerful CEO Charles Bromley watches these tests eagerly, wanting to build a fortune by selling the synthetic substitute to most people, while secretly planning to keep pure human blood for himself and other wealthy vampires.

While driving home, Dalton accidentally runs another vehicle off the road. Discovering the occupants are humans, Dalton hides them from the police. Before they leave, their leader, Audrey, sees his Bromley Marks identification, thereby learning Edward's name and occupation. At home, Edward is surprised by his estranged brother Frankie with a gift of a bottle of pure human blood. The gift reignites a long-standing argument – Edward refuses to drink human blood, while Frankie, a soldier, enjoys it. A subsider invades the house, forcing the brothers to kill it together.

The next morning, Audrey visits Edward and sets up a meeting with Lionel 'Elvis' Cormac, a human who was cured of vampirism. Before Cormac can explain his reversion, a military team arrives with Frankie, who follows Edward and intends to capture Cormac and Audrey. Audrey knocks Frankie unconscious, and the three escape. Cormac reveals that he was cured of vampirism when a car crash ejected him from his sun-proof vehicle. Elvis burst into flames but fell into a river before the sunlight killed him. He theorizes that the brief exposure to sunlight turned him human. Edward agrees to help Cormac recreate the cure and prevent humans from being wiped out.

Edward meets Senator Wes Turner, a human sympathizer secretly helping to develop a cure. Vampire soldiers capture an approaching human convoy and track the vineyard's location, forcing Turner and the humans to flee. Audrey, Cormac, and Edward stay behind. After many painful trials, they successfully cure Edward of vampirism. They later find Turner and all the humans slaughtered and drained of blood.

Alison Bromley, one of the captured humans, is revealed to be the beloved daughter of Charles Bromley. As she refuses to become a vampire, Charles has Frankie forcibly turn her. However, she refuses to drink human blood and devolves into a subsider, and is executed by being dragged into sunlight. Upset by her death, Frankie seeks his brother. The military imposes martial law to curb the subsider population.

Edward, Cormac, and Audrey break into Christopher's home and ask him to help spread the cure. Having finally discovered a viable blood substitute, Christopher rejects the cure and calls in soldiers, who capture Audrey while Cormac and Edward escape. They are found by Frankie, who agrees to help, but instinctively bites and feeds on Cormac. As it turns out, a cured human is immune to vampire bites, while cured vampire blood is a cure in itself.

Trying to save Audrey, Edward surrenders himself to Charles. Edward taunts Charles into biting him, turning Charles human. Edward leaves Charles to be killed at the hands of blood-starved vampire troops. Frankie arrives and sacrifices himself to the soldiers, allowing Edward and Audrey to escape. In the ensuing feeding frenzy, only a few surviving soldiers are cured. To conceal the cure, Christopher kills the soldiers and is about to shoot Edward and Audrey when Cormac kills him. The three survivors drive off into the sunrise with the cure that will change the general population back to restore humanity.

== Cast ==
- Ethan Hawke as Edward Dalton. He is a 35-year-old vampire hematologist who was turned by his brother Frankie, and started working for the newly formed Bromley Marks to work on a blood substitute. He shows sympathy for the humans, since he refused to be turned at the start of the plague, and refuses to drink human blood, instead relying on blood from other animals. He volunteers for the project to be turned back into a human and leads a revolution to return the human race back.
- Willem Dafoe as Lionel 'Elvis' Cormac. A former professional mechanic, he was one of the first in the city to adapt cars for daylight driving, with retractable UV screens and exterior cameras. One time, while driving during the daytime, he was exhausted from not drinking blood, which caused him to be distracted and crash his black 1957 Chevy Bel Air into a fence, ejecting him into the sunshine; Elvis burst into flames, but his life was saved when he fell into the water, turning him back into a human due to the precise amount of exposure to the sun. He was found by Audrey. CinemaBlend writes that Dafoe provides "the majority of the film's comic relief."
- Claudia Karvan as Audrey Bennett, who was educating at college during the plague. She hid on her family's old vineyard and, refusing to become a vampire, she gathers humans and shelters them. She also found the already cured Elvis and sheltered him. They lead the group to try to find other surviving humans.
- Michael Dorman as Frankie Dalton, Edward's estranged younger brother, who turned his brother into a vampire since he was afraid of losing him. Ed had previously said that he would rather die than become a vampire, so Frankie turned him by force because he couldn't bear to have his brother die. Frankie has an epiphany after turning back into a human and wants to help, but is later killed while trying to help his brother.
- Isabel Lucas as Alison Bromley, Charles' estranged daughter, forcibly turned into a vampire by Frankie. She rejects her father and turns into a Subsider after drinking her own blood. Her death causes Frankie to have an epiphany and change sides.
- Vince Colosimo as Christopher Caruso, a hematologist, Edward's coworker at Bromley Marks, although much less ambitious than Edward. He succeeds in creating a blood substitute, which would make him wealthy and powerful in a world of vampires, and so is hostile to the possibility of a cure for vampirism.
- Sam Neill as Charles Bromley, ruthless owner of Bromley Marks, the largest provider of blood in the U.S. In 2008, shortly before the plague, he was diagnosed with cancer and expected to live only a few years. He became a vampire to save himself from cancer, at the cost of being rejected by his beloved daughter Alison. He has no interest in becoming human again, since he wants to use the substitute to become the richest man alive and for all eternity.

== Production ==
In November 2004, Lionsgate acquired the script to Daybreakers, written by Peter and Michael Spierig. The brothers, who directed Undead (2003), were attached to direct Daybreakers. In September 2006, the brothers received financing from Film Finance Corporation Australia, with production set to take place in Queensland. Daybreakers began filming on the Gold Coast at Warner Bros. Movie World studios and in Brisbane on 16 July 2007. The production budget was $US21 million, with the State Government contributing $US1 million to the filmmakers. Principal photography was completed on schedule in September 2007, with reshoots following to extend key sequences.

=== Casting ===
The Spierigs told interviewer Eric Vespe of Ain't It Cool News (AICN) that they wrote the lead for Ethan Hawke, who was initially hesitant to join the production as he was "not a big fan of genre pictures." He ultimately accepted the role as Edward after deciding the story felt "different" from that of a typical B movie. He took the role in May, 2007. Michael Spierig explained to AICN that once Hawke was in, other actors were interested, particularly Sam Neill (who joined the cast as the main antagonist that same May) and Willem Dafoe. Peter Spierig added, "Sam was on the film for about three weeks and every day was such a joy." Neill "is such a refined, articulate, intelligent guy," Peter joked to the interviewer, that it was hard to "say to Sam, 'Now, I'm going to throw this bucket of blood all over you, is that all right?' and he's like 'Y-y-yeah... okay.'"

Hawke described the film as an allegory of man's pacing with natural resources: "We're eating our own resources so people are trying to come up with blood substitutes, trying to get us off of foreign humans." The actor also said that despite the serious allegory, the film was "low art" and "completely unpretentious and silly".

=== Visual effects and design ===
Weta Workshop created the creature effects for Daybreakers. The Spierig brothers wanted the vampires in the film to have a classical aesthetic to them while feeling like a more contemporary interpretation. After experimenting with complex makeup designs, they decided that a more minimalistic approach to makeup had a more powerful effect.

The film's color palette emphasizes the differences between the vampire world, with its night scenes and Bromley Marks offices, and the humans' world. One reviewer noted that most of the vampire scenes' colors are "colder, clinical" and "noir-ish": blue, gray, and white, with splashes of crimson for blood and yellow for the vampires' eyes. The daylit scenes are warmer, with yellow, orange and sepia, and some relief of lush greenery. Another reviewer praised the palate as creative, "celebratory of the outlandish bloodshed while determined to maintain a morose aesthetic. That it certainly does. Clever uses of light, droll color, and fondness for shadow give Daybreakers a minimalist, sleek look that says both restrained and near future."

Peter Spierig told an interviewer that the colors, and their avoidance of overuse of blue lenses, were a conscious aesthetic choice:

That was pretty much in the script and it's also that the human world has a completely different light. In the vampire world we decided to use a lot of big florescent light panels to kind of give the illusion of a window without actually using an external light source. That was definitely always planned, where you have the warm and earthy side of humanity while you have the dark toned side for the undead. It was always a conscious choice, but you have to be careful with decisions like that, because it can always be seen as derivative. We were always conscious of trying to make it not Underworld with black leather.

== Release ==
Daybreakers premiered on 11 September 2009 at the 34th Annual Toronto International Film Festival. The film was released on 6 January 2010 in the UK and Ireland, 8 January 2010 in North America, and 4 February 2010 in Australia.

=== Critical reception ===
On Rotten Tomatoes the film has an approval rating of 69% based on reviews from 154 critics, with an average rating of 6.1/10. The website's critical consensus states: "Though it arrives during an unfortunate glut of vampire movies, Daybreakers offers enough dark sci-fi thrills — and enough of a unique twist on the genre — to satisfy filmgoers." On Metacritic the film has a weighted average score of 57 out of 100 based on 31 reviews, indicating "mixed or average" reviews. Audiences surveyed by CinemaScore gave the film an average grade of "C" on an A+ to F scale.

Richard Brody of The New Yorker liked the film, saying it "delivers the conceptual delight of a fifties-style B movie," whose "conceit is worked out in whiz-bang diabolical detail" and "brought to life with imaginative effects." Den of Geek, in a 4-out-of-5-stars review, praised the acting by Neill and Dafoe, the jump scares, and the "brilliantly realised (if underused)" Subsider makeup effects, concluding, "Given the film's fantastical premise, it is reassuringly grounded in reality. ... It's a nice mix of action, sci-fi and thriller, and the tension keeps up throughout." Film critic Brian Eggert gave the movie a rating of 3 out of 4 stars, praising its "entertaining yet smart style," and seeing in the Spierig brothers "the potential to become great genre filmmakers, following in the footsteps of cult horror masters John Carpenter [and] George A. Romero" because they "help reestablish vampires into scary and socially reflective movie monsters."

Variety gave the film a mixed review stating the film had a "cold, steely blue, black and gray 'Matrix'-y look," going on to say Daybreakers "emerges as a competent but routine chase thriller that lacks attention-getting dialogue, unique characters or memorable setpieces that might make it a genre keeper rather than a polished time-filler." Rolling Stone gave the film two and a half out of four stars and called the film a B movie and a "nifty genre piece". Roger Ebert also gave the film two and a half stars, stating that the "intriguing premise ... ends as so many movies do these days, with fierce fights and bloodshed."

Richard Roeper gave the film a B+ and called it "a bloody good time." Laura Kern of Bloodvine also wrote a positive review, calling the movie "a slick, violent, and intensely gloomy horror/action/sci-fi hybrid that stands out in a crowded field of end-of-mankind movie scenarios;" Kern says the directors' "second feature more than atones for their less-than-promising debut, Undead ([2003]), a dippy zombie flick that had moments of inspiration but little of the energy that relentlessly surges through Daybreakers." CinemaBlend, with a 3.5/5 star rating, calls the movie "a wild ride packed with innovation, blood and a whole lot of fun." The reviewer continues,

The film slows significantly at the midpoint, but everything else is such a blast it blends in almost unnoticeably. Even some laughable special effects are strangely appropriate. The power of the Spierig Brothers is mighty and it'll be impossible to sit down for this effort without becoming completely absorbed in their futuristic world of vampire clichés and novelties. The cinematography is on point, the screenplay creatively developed and then, to the horror fan's delight, both are doused with enough blood to make a wildly refreshing vampire movie.

Brian Eggert also praised the effects, saying that the Spierigs "completed the CGI animation themselves. However, the true visual marvel of the movie isn't the computer effects, which mostly help complete cityscapes and the human farming machinery. The wonders are the abundant makeup work, everything from the hideous Subsiders to the use of fake blood has a potent tangible quality onscreen. So many movies today use computer-animated blood (see Ninja Assassin for buckets of the stuff that isn't there) to save time and money, and they use the same tricks to render their creatures (see the Underworld series for some CGI vamps and werewolves). It costs a lot to clean up and reshoot a blood-splattered scene and employ makeup artists and have actors sitting in chairs for hours on end. So the authenticity of the blood and monster effects throughout the film is appreciated."

=== Box office ===
As of October 2010, the global box gross was US$51,416,464, including $30,101,577 in the US. In its opening weekend in the United States, Daybreakers opened at No. 4 behind Avatar, Sherlock Holmes and Alvin and the Chipmunks: The Squeakquel with $15,146,692 in 2,523 theaters, averaging $6,003 per theater.

=== Home media ===
Daybreakers was released on DVD and Blu-ray in the United States on 11 May 2010 and in the United Kingdom on 31 May 2010. The UK DVD copy was rated as an 18 instead of the original 15 rating that was used for cinema release. A 3D Blu-ray version was released in November, 2011.

The film was re-released in the 4K Ultra HD Blu-ray format on September 10, 2019 (since the movie takes place in 2019), with what a reviewer called "outstanding Dolby Atmos audio."

In 2024, for the movie's 15th anniversary, Umbrella Entertainment of Australia released a Collector's Edition 4K and Blu-ray boxed package including an accompanying hardcover book, movie poster, various featurettes, and gag reel; the "making-of" documentary has commentary by the Spierig Brothers and creature special effects designer Steve Boyle.

== See also ==
- Cinema of Australia
- List of stories set in a future now in the past
- Vampire film
