= It Is Never Too Late to Mend (1911 film) =

- Daily Telegraph 21 January 1911
- Directed by: W. J. Lincoln
- Written by: W. J. Lincoln
- Based on: the novel by Charles Reade adapted into a play by Charles Reade
- Produced by: John Tait; Nevin Tait; Millard Johnson; William Gibson
- Starring: Stanley Walpole
- Cinematography: Orrie Perry
- Production companies: Johnson and Gibson
- Distributed by: J & N Tait (Australia); Sawyer's Pictures (USA)
- Release dates: 7 January 1911 (Sydney); August 1914 (USA)
- Running time: 4,000 feet (est. an hour)
- Country: Australia
- Languages: Silent film English intertitles
- Budget: £300-£400

It Is Never Too Late to Mend is a 1911 Australian feature-length silent film written and directed by W. J. Lincoln.

It was based on a stage adaptation of the popular 1865 novel It Is Never Too Late to Mend: A Matter-of-Fact Romance by Charles Reade about the corrupt penal system in Australia. The movie was called "certainly one of the best pictures ever taken in Australia."

The 1911 film is considered a lost film. The novel was filmed again in 1913 and in 1937 (the latter film being the definitive version starring Tod Slaughter as the evil squire).

The film was made by the Tait family, who also made the first Australian feature film, The Story of the Kelly Gang. The Taits went on to make several more films with Lincoln, including The Mystery of a Hansom Cab (1911), The Luck of Roaring Camp (1911), Called Back (1911), The Lost Chord (May 1911), The Bells (1911) and The Double Event (1911). This was Lincoln's first film in a rather short career, as he died soon after in 1917 in Sydney, Australia at age 47.

== Plot ==
The film begins at Grance Farm in England, rented by Georgie and William Fileing. The farm is struggling and the brothers have to sell their new hay to stave off the landlord. The Honorable Frank Winchester contemplates going abroad and asks George to accompany him. However, George is in love with his cousin, Susan Merton, and does not want to make the trip.

Susan is also loved by the villainous John Meadows. He refuses to lend money to Georgie and there is an eviction sale on the farm.

George Fielding travels to Australia to make enough money to marry Susan. George discovers gold and a bushranger gang tries to rob him but the other miners come to George's rescue.

There is a subplot about a thief acquaintance of George, Tom Robinson, who is sent to gaol and suffers brutal treatment at the hands of the guards. Susan is about to marry the evil Meadows but he is unmasked at the wedding by Isaac Levy. The wedding goes ahead with Susan marrying George instead.

The film consisted of 60 scenes. It was issued with a summary of the story and featured chapter titles which prepared the audiences for incidents before they happened. It was also often accompanied by a lecturer.

The film was one of the longest early Australian films running at 4,000 feet and one review said it ran for almost an hour.

According to The Age "Interesting phases of early Australian life are revealed, including the fascinating stories of the gold discoveries... in the construction of the story for picture purposes, the salient features of the novel have been retained and a descriptive address accompanies the production."

== Cast ==
- Stanley Walpole

== Production ==
The novel has been credited with exposing cruelties in the Australian prison system and having helped end the convict system. Stage adaptations of the novel had been popular since 1865.

The Tait brothers were theatre entrepreneurs who had moved into film production with The Story of the Kelly Gang and Robbery Under Arms. In February 1911 The Bulletin reported that:

The Taits are going to produce It’s Never Too Late To Mend in biograph drama form at Melbourne Glaeiarium. "Willie" Lincoln, who was an Australian playwright in his youth, and is nowadays running the "Paradise" Pictures at St. Kilda, is understood to be responsible for this biograph version of Charles Reade’s drama. Picture show condensations of familiar stories, also original film dramas of the sort now imported from America and Europe, might as well be locally fixed up. There’s no better country than Australia for open-air photography, and few that are nearly as good.

The film was shot in Melbourne and "enacted by a specially-selected company of Victorian artists" who were "a selected metropolitan company of 60 performers." The estimated budget was £300-£400.

== Reception ==
The movie debuted at the Olympia Theatre in Haymarket, Sydney in January 1911. A lecturer accompanied screenings and would explain the action that took place.

=== Box office ===
The movie broke box office records at the Olympia. It later drew strong crowds in Melbourne as well.

=== Critical ===
The Bulletin called it:

An interesting piece... adapted by W.J. Lincoln for dumb show purposes, and Johnson and Gibson had prepared three or four thousand feet of photographs for reproduction on the screen. The picture promised well for the future of the Australian "art film" industry. The adapter has "potted" the novel, rather than the drama of the same name, and done it very well. The actors look their parts and play them dramatically, and the heroine, who is a first consideration and the only girl in the piece, fills the bill quite charmingly. For about an hour It’s Never Too Late To Mend kept a packed house interested. A man with a ripe, sonorous voice supplied brief descriptive details, and kept the story in a state of coherency, the only noticeable shortcoming being the absence of a moral tag, to the effect that the conversion of the English thief, Tom Robinson, had been fully completed in The Sunny South.

The Sydney Sunday Times said there "was special performances by a company of Australian actors."

Melbourne's Table Talk called it "a most gratifying success in all ways. The pictures are clear and the acting is adequate, while to our ideas it is more natural, for it has not the Gallic mannerisms and excessive gesture noticeable in some of the imported pictorial dramas, which are usually interpreted by French artists."

The Riverine Herald stated "the cast was well chosen and well balanced, and the dramatic action of the play was finely brought out."

The Launceston Examiner said "in its construction the adapter has endeavoured to retain all the main and most salient features of the novel, allowing for the bridging over of many incidents, to make a natural sequence and clear-cut story."

The Launceston Daily Telegraph said the novel had been "exceedingly well adapted by W. J. Lincoln... [a] magnificent pictorial representation, so full of strong human interest".

=== USA release ===
The film was released in the US in August 1914.

== Legacy ==
The box office success of the film encouraged the Tait brothers and Millard and Johnson to appoint W.J. Lincoln as the main director for their new company, Amalgamated Pictures, which operated for over a year.
