= J. C. Williamson Film Company =

Film studio

J. C. Williamson Film Company was a short-lived Australian film production company in the 1910s. It was part of the theatrical firm J. C. Williamson's, and produced a number of feature films during 1914-1918.

== Origins ==
In 1914, Williamson's became concerned with reports of American films being made from plays which they were producing in Australia, such as Sealed Orders and The Sign of the Cross. Thus they decided to produce their own films.

== Production ==
They bought the studios of Lincoln-Cass Films in Melbourne and hired two of its staff, Maurice Bertel and William Joseph Lincoln. The unit was put under the control of visiting American actor and director Fred Niblo. He directed two play adaptations for the company.

Williamsons then decided to produce original stories, starting with Within Our Gates. These were released in advance of the Niblo films.

Their films were shot at the site of the Comedy Theatre in Melbourne in Exhibition Street.

The company eventually lost enthusiasm for filmmaking and decided to concentrate on its theatrical endeavours. The film studio was converted into a scenery dock.

According to writer Ralph Marsden:

The Firm's overall loss on their film program, although probably not too great, was bad enough to deter them from further production investment – apart from a couple of not-too-successful attempts in the early 1930s and again in 1966 as co-producers of They’re A Weird Mob... Yet back in 1916 the same Firm had had the advantage – at least in rudimentary form – of ‘vertical integration’: they had then had the resources to produce, distribute, promote and exhibit their own films. While they undoubtedly had an appreciation of the commercial value of cinema, what the Firm seemed to lack was a basic understanding of and enthusiasm for the new medium. The late J. C. Williamson himself had had an early association with the ‘bio tableau’ yet thought it ‘... derogatory to the dignity of the most important theatrical enterprise in Australia to be mixed up with that form of entertainment’. Despite the Firm's belated involvement in film production, that attitude seems to have prevailed: to make a film was merely a convenient means of recording or ‘cinematographing’ a play as quickly and cheaply as possible. There also seems to have been surprisingly little understanding of the need for strong pre-release publicity; once the film was made the reputation of the original stage production was thought sufficient to ensure success. With an enlightened, courageous and persistent production head, it's just possible that the JCW studio might have endured; as it was, the enterprise quickly became a lost chance, with its lesson and existence soon completely forgotten.

== Filmography ==
(in order of production)

=== J. C. Williamson Ltd Productions ===
- Get-Rich-Quick Wallingford – first film shot though not released until 1916
- Officer 666 (1916)
- Within Our Gates (1915)
- Within the Law (1916)
- For Australia (1915)
- Seven Keys to Baldpate (1916)

=== Films Using the Studio ===
- The Paramount Pictorial (1916) – shorts
- Nurse Cavell (1916)
- La Revanche (1916)
- The Life's Romance of Adam Lindsay Gordon (1918)
- His Only Chance (1918)

== See also ==
- List of film production companies
- List of television production companies
