= The Luck of Roaring Camp (1911 film) =

- Directed by: W. J. Lincoln
- Written by: W. J. Lincoln
- Based on: stage adaptation by Mark Blow and Ida Molesworth of the novel The Luck of Roaring Camp by Francis Bret Harte
- Produced by: William Gibson; Millard Johnson; John Tait; Nevin Tait
- Starring: Ethel Buckley; Robert Inman; George Marlow's Dramatic Company
- Cinematography: Orrie Perry
- Production company: Amalgamated Pictures
- Distributed by: Tait's Pictures
- Release dates: 8 April 1911 (Sydney): 24 March 1911 (Melbourne)
- Running time: 4,000 feet
- Country: Australia
- Languages: Silent film English intertitles

The Luck of Roaring Camp is a 1911 Australian feature-length film directed by W. J. Lincoln now considered a lost film. It was highly regarded in its day, in part because it was based on a play that was popular with audiences.

It was one of several films Lincoln made with the Tait family, who had produced The Story of the Kelly Gang.

== Plot ==
The setting is California during the California Gold Rush. On the California goldfields, Will Gordin is falsely accused of murder and is about to be lynched when his girlfriend rides to the rescue. Scenes included:

- Tom Barnes at Bay.
- Fun in a Roaring Camp Saloon.
- The Murder of Old Pard.
- A Duel to the Death.
- The Throw of the Dice.

== Cast ==
- Ethel Buckley as Nell Curtis
- Robert Inman
- John Cosgrove
- Harry Driver
- Nellis Fergusson as Jovita
- Frank Reis as Gonzales

== Production ==
It was based on a stage adaptation of the story by Francis Bret Harte which had proved popular with Australian audiences as performed by George Marlow's Dramatic Company since 1910. This production moved to the Princess Theatre in Melbourne started 4 February 1911. The Bulletin reviewed this saying:

When The Luck of Roaring Camp was staged in Sydney by George Marlow, Ltd., a year ago. The Bulletin remarked that the bellow drama had taken the name of Bret Harte’s novel in vain. Probably the audience at Melbourne Princess’s last Saturday didn’t seek for Bret Harte’s story in the drama that wore its title, but was merely looking for a mining camp and listening for roars. In which case the audience’s expectations were fulfilled. The mine, located in America, provides Diver with lurid opportunities in the way of murder and false accusation; but he is ultimately brought to grief by a hero who wins the girl and secures the property, and, in fact, gets the Luck. Many things, including some stirring episodes of comic relief, happen before the ends of poetic justice are served. If the people who goto the Princess’s are fond of this sort of melodrama, this is the sort of melodrama which should suit them down to the ground and up to the roof.

The Age said it "was not badly constructed." On 1 February 1911 it was announced the partnership of Millard Johnson and Willard Gibson had made a film version that went for 4,000 feet. According to Table Talk "Over 130 people are taking part, and horses and stage coaches are conspicuous in the picture. It has taken 11 days to complete the film." The George Marlow company provided the cast for the film, with the lead played by Marlow's wife Ethel Buckley. A cast of over a hundred was reportedly used. According to the Sydney Morning Herald "The picture is said to convey a more adequate idea of the place than the staged drama."

== Reception ==
The movie premiered at the Glacarium Theatre in Melbourne, where the Sydney Morning Herald said it did "big business". Then it played the Palace in Sydney.

It followed the release of Lincoln's earlier film The Mystery of the Hansom Cab.

Reviews were generally strong. The critic from the Sydney Morning Herald called it:

A thrilling story without words that is complete in itself without the words and that makes the drama more realistic than ever it could be on a stage without the aid of the pictures. The play has been carefully selected for this method of portrayal because it teems with exciting episodes and thrilling incidents in the life of the hard-living westerners. One part in particular that could never be seen on a stage without the camera is the splendid exhibition of horsemanship shown by a team of rough riders who were specifically employed for the purpose... almost every foot of it [the film] is bristling with exciting incidents.

Table Talk wrote that:

Nightly Mr. Walter Dalgieish gives a' descriptive lecture which tends to supply the want of dialogue so adequately that the whole play seems heard as. well as seen. The pictures are very life-like and clear, and are reproduced in a most effective way. These pictures, taken in Australia. for Australians, certainly compare veryfavorably with those manufactured overseas the acting is not marked by' that excess gesture and—to us—overdrawn-marks of yisible emotion, which are so often noticeable' in the picture dramas which have been prepared on the Continent.

The Daily Telegraph called it "a fine biograph melodrama". The Sydney Truth called it "a splendid show." "A Triump of cinematography" said the Evening News.

The Sydney Sun said "Tho actors and actresses In tho sevoral scenes ore all Australians, specially organised foe the purpose, and they performed their allotted tasks with keen appreciation of the requirements of tho many sensational sltua«tions... The film is an exceilont one, and on Saturday, night was highly appreciated by a largo audience."

The Bulletin said "The fabrication is all right in its way, though this paper prefers Taits’ occasional displays of color subjects."

Everyone's later said Buckley's performance in this film and Driving a Girl to destruction "was so marked, even in those early efforts, that she received several flattering offers to continue the work, but it was a medium which did not suit the electric temperament of one who had proved herself to be one of the most versatile soubrettes of the Australian stage, and she preferred to rest on her laurels."
