= The Bells (1911 film) =

- Directed by: W. J. Lincoln
- Written by: W. J. Lincoln
- Based on: the play The Bells by Erckmann-Chatrian adapted by Leopold Lewis and W. J. Lincoln
- Produced by: William Gibson; Millard Johnson; John Tait; Nevin Tait
- Starring: Arthur Styan; Nellie Bramley
- Cinematography: Orrie Perry
- Production company: Amalgamated Pictures
- Distributed by: Tait's Pictures
- Release date: 7 October 1911 (Melbourne)
- Running time: 4,000 feet
- Country: Australia
- Languages: Silent film English intertitles

The Bells is a 1911 Australian feature-length silent film directed by W. J. Lincoln. It is based on the famous stage melodrama by Erckmann-Chatrian, adapted by Leopold Lewis, which in turn had been adapted for the Australian stage by W. J. Lincoln before he made it into a film.

It is today considered a lost film.

It was one of several films Lincoln made with the Tait family, who had produced The Story of the Kelly Gang. According to Lincoln's obituary in The Bulletin it was one of Lincoln's best films.

== Plot ==
Mathias (Arthur Styan) is an innkeeper in a village in Alsace, happily married to Catherine (Miss Grist) and with a daughter Annette (Nellie Bramley). However he is greatly in debt, so on Christmas Day 1833, he murders a Polish Jew (Mr Cullenane) who visits the inn for his gold. He uses this to pay off his debts and rise in society, becoming the burgomaster of the town – however he is always tormented by guilt.

Fifteen years later on Christmas Day, Mathias becomes delirious and hears the sound of the Jew's sleigh bells. He dreams he is being tried for the murder and is found guilty. He awakes and dies, leaving his family none the wiser.

== Cast ==
- Arthur Styan as Mathias
- Nellie Bramley as Annette
- Ethel Grist as Catherine
- John Ennis as Walter
- Ward Lyons as Hans
- Charles Lawrence as Christian
- Mr Johns as mesmerist
- Mr Ebbsmith as Dr Zimmer
- George Kensington as notary
- Mr Devon as Tony
- Mr Devine as Fritz
- Mr Cullenane as the Polish Jew
- Mr Coleridge as judge
- Mr Sinclair as clerk
- Marion Willis as Sozel

== Production ==
The film was an adaptation of a well known play and featured the only known screen appearance of stage actor Nellie Bramley. It was shot partly on location of Mount Donna Buang in Victoria.

Sam Crews was the scenic artist, and John Ennis was the stage manager. Stage scenery was hired from J.C. Williamson Ltd. It was shot at a studio in St Kilda.

== Release ==
Screenings of the film were often accompanied by a lectured from J Ennis, who was in the film.

The Adelaide Critic said "The snow scene at Mount Dounna Buang, near Warburton, came in for much admiration."

The film was released in the US in 1914 by Sawyers Inc.

== See also ==
- The Bells (US 1918)
- The Bells (US 1926)
- The Bells (UK 1931)
- The Burgomeister (Australia 1935)
