= After Sundown (1911 film) =

- Directed by: W. J. Lincoln
- Written by: W. J. Lincoln
- Based on: one act play by W.J. Lincoln
- Produced by: William Gibson; Millard Johnson; John Tait; Nevin Tait
- Starring: Godfrey Cass
- Cinematography: Orrie Perry
- Production company: Amalgamated Pictures
- Release date: 1911
- Running time: 60 minutes (est.)
- Country: Australia
- Languages: Silent film English intertitles
- Budget: £600-£700

After Sundown is a 1911 Australian film directed by W. J. Lincoln set in the Australian bush.

According to Lincoln's obituary in The Bulletin it was one of Lincoln's best films.

Only six minutes of the film survive today.

== Plot ==
Two men, Gilbert Baxter and Western Moore, fight over the same woman, Betty, who lives with her uncle, Angus McDougall. The villain taunts the hero with the fact he has won her, until an old man appears and shoots the villain dead. It turns out the old man was the father of a girl "ruined" by the villain.

== Cast ==
- Leslie Woods as Gilbert Baxter
- Godfrey Cass as Western Moore
- Nellie Bramdley

== Production ==
The film was based on a one-act 1896 play by W.J. Lincoln. According to a press account the aim was to "realise the ideal of a bush story which shall be true to actual life in Australia, sweet and natural in its atmosphere, dealing with type of chnracter which are to be found in the wayback country."

It was a film from Amalgamated Pictures and was shot in September 1911 at their studios in St Kilda as well as on location at Healesville, outside Melbourne, and Coranderrk Mission Station.

== Reception ==
The film was never released.
