= Rip Van Winkle (1912 film) =

- Directed by: W. J. Lincoln
- Based on: stage adaptation by Joseph Jefferson and Dion Boucicault of Rip Van Winkle by Washington Irving
- Produced by: William Gibson; Millard Johnson; John Tait; Nevin Tait
- Starring: Arthur Styan
- Cinematography: Orrie Perry
- Production company: Amalgamated Pictures
- Distributed by: Tait's Pictures
- Release date: 6 April 1912 (Melbourne)
- Country: Australia
- Languages: Silent film English intertitles

Rip Van Winkle is a 1912 Australian feature-length film directed by W. J. Lincoln about Rip Van Winkle. It was arguably Australia's first fantasy film.

It is considered a lost film.

== Plot ==
Rip Van Winkle is a lazy man who likes to wander around with his dog, Wolf. One day, he ventures into the Kaatskill mountains, where he encounters a strange group of men drinking and playing bowls. He drinks their mysterious brew and falls asleep. When he wakes up, he is shocked to discover that 20 years have passed, and everything has changed.

The story is a charming tale that depicts how America changed during the Civil War, but in a more subtle way. Rip's experiences show how the war affected the people and the country. It also portrays the changing values and attitudes towards work and leisure time.

== Cast ==
- Arthur Styan as Rip Van Winkle
- Nellie Bramley as daughter of Rip Van Winkle

== Production ==
The film was made in the wake of a successful Australian season of Joseph Jefferson and Dion Boucicault's theatre adaptation of Washington Irving's 1819 short story "Rip Van Winkle".

Assisting Lincoln was Sam Crews.

== Reception ==
The film debuted in Melbourne in April 1912. A version of the story screened in Sydney in December of that year but that may have been a different movie.

=== Critical ===
The Bendigo Advertiser said that "the famous story is most effectively explained in the picture production."

One reviewer of the Prahran Telegraph wrote that star Arthur Styan "has figured in several of the previous productions of the Amalgamated Pictures Ltd., and who makes quite a success of this."

Table Talk called it "a long and striking adaptation of the famous story. The pictures were taken by Amalgamated Pictures Ltd., and, as a local production, are a credit to the producers." Another review from that paper said "the costumes and scenery are beautiful."

In April 1912 The Bulletin said "Rip Van Winkle is biographed in Melbourne excellently, by an Australian company, with Styan as Winkle."
