= Moondyne (film) =

- Theatrical release poster
- Directed by: W. J. Lincoln
- Written by: John Boyle O'Reilly; W. J. Lincoln
- Based on: novel Moondyne by John Boyle O'Reilly
- Starring: George Bryant; Godfrey Cass; Roy Redgrave
- Cinematography: Maurice Bertel
- Production company: Lincoln-Cass Films
- Release date: 1 September 1913
- Running time: over 3,000 feet
- Country: Australia
- Languages: Silent; English intertitles

Moondyne is a 1913 Australian film from the Lincoln-Cass Film Company based on the novel Moondyne. It was the second film from Lincoln Cass.

It is considered a lost film.

== Plot ==
In 1848, convict Joe is assigned as a labourer to settler Isaac Bowman in Western Australia. Joe escapes and takes refuge with a group of aboriginals led by Te Mana Roa, who tell him about a mountain of gold.

Bowman recaptures Joe, who tells him about the mine. Bowman goes to the mine, kills the chief and loads his horse with gold, but ends up perishing in the desert, leaving Joe with his aboriginal friends.

== Cast ==
- George Bryant as Joe Moondyne
- Roy Redgrave as Isaac Bowman
- Godfrey Cass as Te Mana Roa

== Production ==
The film was shot in and around Melbourne.

== Reception ==
According to one review:

The true story of Joe Gilchrist, though poetised in the drama to some extent, affords scope for much dramatic feeling and scenic display, and the many views of Australian scenery are delightful. The acting is vigorous and full of character, and the photographic work sharp and clear. Generally, it may be said that 'Moondyne' is quite up to American and European standard, and should command much attention in other parts of the world.
