= The Mystery of a Hansom Cab (1911 film) =

The Mystery of the Hansom Cab
- Directed by: W. J. Lincoln
- Written by: W. J. Lincoln
- Based on: the novel The Mystery of the Hansom Cab by Fergus Hume
- Produced by: William Gibson; Millard Johnson; John Tait; Nevin Tait
- Starring: "A selected metropolitan company" Walter Dalgeish
- Cinematography: Orrie Perry
- Production company: Amalgamated Pictures
- Distributed by: Sawyer Pictures (USA)
- Release dates: 4 March 1911 (Melbourne); August 1914 (USA)
- Running time: 4,000 feet (est. 80 minutes)
- Country: Australia
- Languages: Silent film English intertitles
- Budget: £300-£400

The Mystery of the Hansom Cab is an Australian feature-length film directed by W. J. Lincoln based on the popular novel, which had also been adapted into a play. It was one of several films Lincoln made with the Tait family, who had produced The Story of the Kelly Gang.

It was the first Australian feature film to have a predominantly urban setting. It has been called the world's first suspense mystery film.

== Plot ==
A Melbourne playboy, Oliver White, is murdered as he is driven home one night in a hansom cab. Investigating the crime encompasses all aspects of Melbourne society. The scenes featured in the movie were:

Gunsler's Café, Collins Street

1. The meeting of Mark Frettleby and Rosanna Moore.
2. Reems Street, East Melbourne. The Courtship.
3. Frettleby's Station. Divided Lives. (Rosanna grows bored with station life and eventually leaves with their baby daughter.)
4. Frettleby's New Love. Frettleby's Rooms.
5. The News of Rosanna's Death. (Mark Frettleby receives a letter from England telling him this.)
6. Room at Myrtle Orange. I love you.
7. Twenty years later.
8. Frettleby's Mansion, St Kilda. (Frettleby is a pillar of society, widowed with a daughter, Madge.)
9. The Ghost of the East.
10. Possum Villa. Grey Street. St Kilda.
11. Two Men at War. (Two men wish to marry Madge, the dissolute Oliver Whyte and the squatter Brian Fitzgerald.)
12. The Orient Hotel, Bourke Street.
13. The Melbourne Club, Collins street.
14. Brian receives a Message.
15. The Cabstand. Scots Church.

Drive to St Kilda

1. Austral Hotel, Bourke Street.
2. Sal Rawlins shows the way.
3. Mother Guttersnipe's, Bourke Street.
4. Death of Rosanna Moore.
5. The Fatal Drive.
6. Collins street. Princes, Bridge.
7. St. Kilda Road.

The Murder in the Cab – Opposite Church of England Grammar School

1. Who is the Man? Esplanade, St, Kilda.
2. The Discovery of the Crime.
3. Possum Villa. On the Track.
4. The Arrest of Brian Fitzgerald.
5. Carlton's Office, Chancery Lane.
6. A Woman to the Rescue. The Melbourne Gaol.
7. Brian Refuses to Streak. Calton's Office.
8. The Reward for Sal. Rawlins. Mother Guttersnipe's, Bourke Street.
9. No News. The Law Courts,
10. Law Court. The Cabman's Story.
11. Menzie's Hotel. Return of Sal. Rawlins.
12. Acquittal of Brian Fitzgerald
13. Mother Guttersnipe's. The Last Call.
14. Mark Frettleby's Home. The Confession.
15. On the Lawn. Who is the Man?
16. Frettleby's Study. Blackmail.

You Killed Oliver Whyte – Death of Mark Frettleby – End of the Astounding Mystery

== Production ==
The team of Millard Johnson and William Gibson, in conjunction with the Tait brothers, were theatre entrepreneurs. They had collaborated on The Story of the Kelly Gang (1906) Robbery Under Arms and It Is Never Too Late to Mend in 1911. The latter led to Johnson, Gibson and the Taits to establish Amalgamated Pictures which would make films under the supervision of W.J. Lincoln, director of Never too Late to Mend. Amalgamated Pictures was formed on 4 March 1911 with capital of £100,000. Contemporary newspaper reports announcing the launch said the company had:

The purpose of promoting the finest and best class of picture Entertainment yet seen in the Australian colonies. With the capital at command, no endeavour will be spared to present to their patrons a standard of show that will eclipse all similar enterprises within the province of our own hemisphere. One of the main endeavours of the amalgamation will be to procure only the very best picture subjects procurable on the world's market. A feature will likewise be made of special and original produced Australian dramas, similar to those that have already proved so hugely successful. The management, in making a public statement of their intentions, anticipate a large share of public support.

With the exception of one scene in the countryside, shooting for Hansom Cab took place in Melbourne, with extensive featuring of local landmarks such as the Melbourne Club, Scot's Church, Collins Street, the Orient Hotel, the Esplanade at St Kilda and Melbourne Gaol. The murder sequence, although set at night time, was shot in the afternoon for better lighting.

A newspaper report on 25 March 1911 said the film was to be "produced" in Sydney but this may be a reference to the release of the film.

In 1924 "Nero" wrote to The Bulletin to say "the interiors... were taken in one day at a little back-yard studio in St. Kilda, and the exteriors at odd moments during the rest of the week. About a fortnight later the completed effort was shown at the Glaciarium, where it ran for three weeks."

== Reception ==
The Melbourne Argus wrote that:

Cab is almost as familiar to Australian readers as Robbery Under Arms or The Term of His Natural Life. Its thrilling incidents provide splendid material for a moving picture drama, and in obtaining the desired film the cinematograph experts have secured an excellent presentation of the features of the novel... The audience took over an hour to throw on the screen, but the keen interest of the audience was held throughout.

The film was usually accompanied by a lecturer.

The movie was a popular success at the box office, particularly in Melbourne. In April 1911 The Bulletin reported:

West's, at Sydney Glaciarium, is booming with Fergus Hume's success, The Mystery of a Hansom Cab. Ever since the drama has been running across the screen, money has had to be turned from the doors. In addition to the Mystery there is the usual varied programme; but the items are changed so frequently these nights that it is hardly worth mentioning them. Anyhow, for the present they are completely eclipsed by the Cab story.

In 1924 "Nero" of The Bulletin looked back on the film writing "The photography was only fair, and the acting might have been improved upon, but the local "bits", such as the Town Hall clock, the Orient Hotel, the Melbourne Club, the cab going over Prince's Bridge, the murder on St. Kilda-road and the old Esplanade Hotel at St. Kilda, were considered enthralling. I had rather a surfeit of the picture myself, because I not only played in it, but lectured on it, and it was rather trying to watch oneself doing the wrong thing night after night for three weeks."

=== USA release ===
The film was released in the US in August 1914 by Sawyer Pictures.

== Later versions ==
According to W. J. Lincoln an overseas film adaptation soon followed. There was also another version in 1925.
