= The Lost Chord (1911 film) =

- Directed by: W. J. Lincoln
- Written by: W. J. Lincoln
- Based on: the song The Lost Chord by Sir Arthur Sullivan
- Produced by: William Gibson; Millard Johnson; John Tait; Nevin Tait
- Cinematography: Orrie Perry
- Production company: Amalgamated Pictures
- Distributed by: Tait's Pictures
- Release date: 13 May 1911
- Country: Australia
- Languages: Silent film English intertitles

The Lost Chord is a 1911 Australian feature-length film directed by W. J. Lincoln based on the famous song The Lost Chord by Sir Arthur Sullivan.

It is now considered a lost film.

== Production ==
It was one of several films Lincoln made with the Tait family, who had produced The Story of the Kelly Gang. The Taits, along with Millard Johnson and William Gibson, had recently established Amalgamated Pictures, which first film was Mystery of the Hansom Cab. The Lost Chord, an adaptation of a hugely popular song, was second.

Screenings were often accompanied by a singer who would perform the song. The film has been regarded as one of the earlier example of film-sound synchronisation. It is likely the film was only short although one account says it ran for 5,000 feet which would be 100 minutes.

== Reception ==
Isabell Bull sang accompanying the film during its original release. The Argus wrote "the pictorial interpretation of Sir Arthur Sullivan's famous composition 'The Lost Chord' was beautiful."

Table Talk wrote the film " drew a large audience to the Glaciarium last Saturday evening, which evidenced its admiration and appreciation of the artistic representation in a very unmistakable way. The inspiration of the words has been cleverly adapted, and the pictorial representa tion is excellent. Miss Bertha Bella's singing of the stately melody does much towards the success of the whole, tor the words and music are given with great, fervor and impressiveness."

The Melbourne Herald, reviewing a line up of films from one evening, declared "the gem of the evening was undoubtedly the fine film entitled The Lost Chord. While the picture was being displayed, Miss Isabel Bull sang Sir Arthur Sullivan's popular song, with organ aceompaniment. The rendering, which was very effective, was loudly applauded."
