= Called Back (1911 film) =

- Directed by: W. J. Lincoln
- Written by: W. J. Lincoln
- Based on: stage adaptation of novel by Hugh Conway
- Produced by: William Gibson; Millard Johnson; John Tait; Nevin Tait
- Starring: Charles Hawtrey; Arthur Styan
- Cinematography: Orrie Perry
- Production company: Amalgamated Pictures
- Release date: 15 April 1911 (Melbourne)
- Running time: 4,000 feet
- Country: Australia
- Languages: Silent film English intertitles
- Budget: £300-£400

Called Back is a 1911 Australian feature-length film directed by W. J. Lincoln based on a popular play which was adapted from an 1883 novel by Hugh Conway. Although the movie was a popular success it is now considered a lost film.

It was one of several films Lincoln made with the Tait family, who had produced The Story of the Kelly Gang.

== Plot ==
In Italy, Dr Ceneri gives money to support Garibaldi, including money meant for his orphaned niece and nephew, Pauline and Anthony. When they grow up, they learn of what he did with the money, and Anthony is killed by the villainous Macari. This is seen by Pauline who goes insane, and the blind Gilbert Vaughan. Vaughan regains his sight, Pauline regains her sanity, and they are married while Macari is arrested.

== Cast ==
- William Quinn
- Arthur Stein

== Production ==
The play had been popular in Australia as a vehicle for George Rignold. The film was shot at the studio of Amalgamated Pictures in St Kilda, Melbourne. There was location filming around St Kilda with St Kilda station standing in for Euston station in London.

== Release ==
In April 1911 The Bulletin said

Taits' Melbourne tabernacle, the Glaciarium, has commenced a special production of "Called Back", with vocal accompaniments by a lady singer. Extra music is also supplied by an energetic orchestra, while a lecturer’s baritone describes the stirring incidents in organ tones.

Screenings of the film were often accompanied by a lecturer, J Ennis.

=== Critical ===
The Adelaide Daily Herald wrote that "Australian cinematographic productions lose nothing by comparison with imported films, and Called Back is as thrilling and interesting a picture as could be wished for. It is 2000 ft. in length, and is typically Australian from start to finish. The acting has been done in the bush, and the atmosphere o! the gum trees runs through, the film."

The Bendigo Advertiser said "the incidents in the film are splendidly enacted, close attention being paid to details."

The Prahran Telegraph wrote:

The work of the adapter has been well done, so that incident follows incident, and the connective explanations thrown on the screen enable anyone unacquainted with the novel to follow the plot with ease. But to supplement this a descriptive narrative is given by a lecturer who voice his heard throughout the theatre. There are many bits of the open-air work which are familiar to St. Kilda people, and the death of Macari, the conspirator, takes place, if we mistake not, at Sandringham. The performance is of a thrilling nature, and holds the audience in rapt attention, while the song Pauline is plantively sung behind the curtain.

The Bulletin wrote "the Tait presentation of "Called Back" on the biograph is very creditable. The cast is not pretentious, but does fairly. The ideal in Australia would be Beatrice Holloway as Pauline, Rignoid or Mervale as Macari, Athol wood as Ceneri, and Roberts as Vaughan. How well "Called Back" opens—better than any other work of fiction, I think. You are enthralled on the first page."
