= Charles Tait (film director) =

Australian film producer and director (1868-1933)

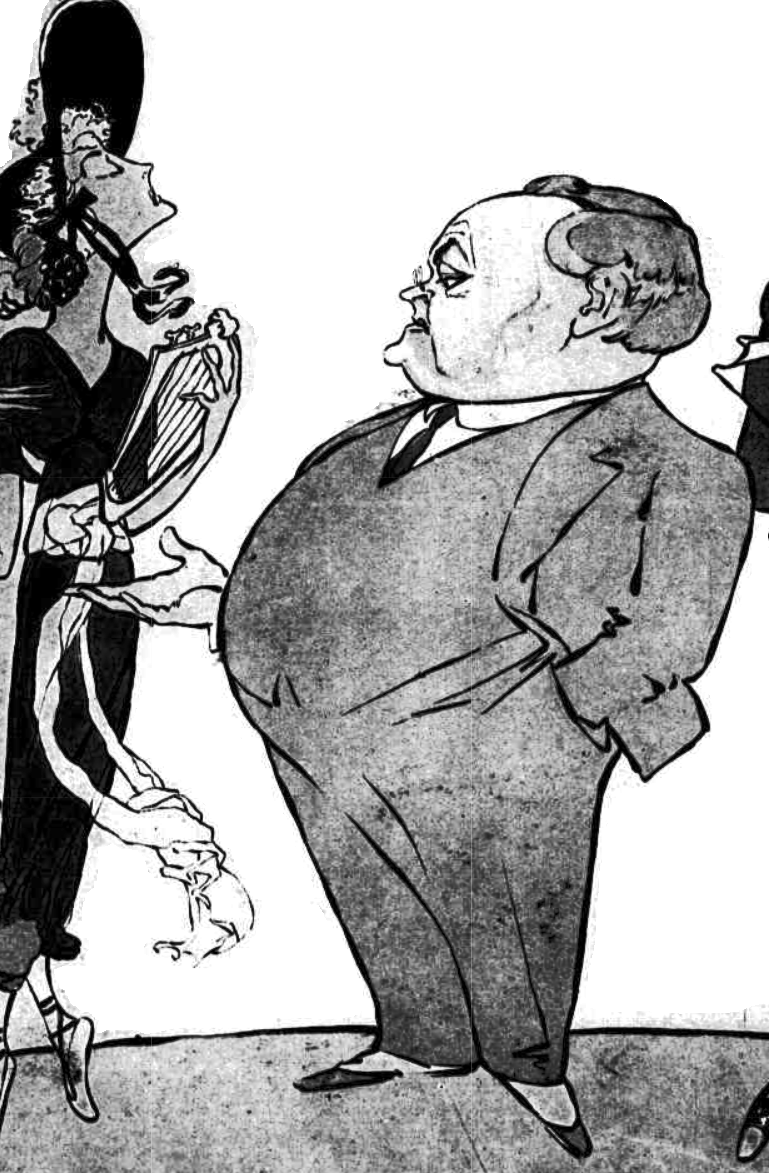
- Caricature by Will Dyson
- Born: 15 November 1868; Castlemaine, Victoria, Australia
- Died: 27 June 1933 (aged 64); Melbourne, Victoria, Australia
- Occupations: Film director, film writer
- Years active: 1906
- Notable work: The Story of the Kelly Gang
- Family: John Henry Tait (brother, deceased); James Nevin Tait (brother, deceased); Edward Tait (brother, deceased); Sir Frank Tait (brother, deceased)

Charles Tait (15 November 1868 – 27 June 1933) was an Australian concert, film and theatrical entrepreneur. His most notable achievement was as the director and writer of The Story of the Kelly Gang regarded as the world's first feature-length film. The film was first shown on 26 December 1906.

Tait was born in Castlemaine, Victoria, the son of John Turnbull Tait (1830–1902), a tailor from Scalloway, Shetland Islands, Scotland, and his English wife Sarah, née Leeming. John Tait migrated to Victoria in 1862 and settled at Castlemaine where he married Sarah. They had nine children: including Charles (1868–1933), John Henry (1871–1955), James Nevin (1876–1961), Edward Joseph (1878–1947) and Frank Samuel (1883–1965) (later Sir Frank). In about 1879, the Taits moved to Richmond, a suburb of Melbourne, Victoria. On 21 June 1899 Charles married Elizabeth Jane Veitch; and they were to have two daughters and two sons.

The Tait brothers' earliest presentations centred on the Athenaeum Hall in Collins Street, Melbourne, with concerts often including popular short, film screenings. This interest led them to join with Millard Johnson and William Gibson in the production of The Story of the Kelly Gang which premièred on 26 December 1906 at the Athenaeum. The film is now recognised as the first feature-length narrative film. They also made a version of Robbery Under Arms.

In March 1911, the brothers John and Nevin Tait, and Millard Johnson and William Gibson merged their film interests in Amalgamated Pictures which for a short time continued to produce features and newsreels before combining with its main competitor, Australasian Films, in 1912. After 1911, the Taits concentrated on concert presentation and occasional film exhibition.

The Tait brothers were associated with J. C. Williamson Ltd. Edward Joseph Tait was a stage producer with J. C. Williamson and General Manager of his company from 1913 to 1916, then joined his brothers in J & N Tait.

Charles died in Melbourne in 1933.

== Filmography ==
- Living London (1904) – distributor
- The Story of the Kelly Gang (1906) – finance, possibly director
