= The Double Event (1911 film) =

- Contemporary advertisement
- Directed by: W. J. Lincoln
- Written by: W. J. Lincoln
- Based on: novel by Nat Gould
- Produced by: William Gibson; Millard Johnson; John Tait; Nevin Tait
- Starring: The Bland Holt Company
- Cinematography: Orrie Perry
- Production company: Amalgamated Pictures
- Distributed by: Tait's Pictures
- Release date: 21 October 1911 (Melbourne)
- Running time: 3,000 feet or over an hour
- Country: Australia
- Languages: Silent film English intertitles
- Budget: £600-700

The Double Event is a 1911 Australian feature-length film directed by W. J. Lincoln based on the first novel by Nat Gould, which had been adapted several times for the stage, notably by Bland Holt.

It was one of several films Lincoln made with the Tait family, who had produced The Story of the Kelly Gang.

It is considered a lost film.

== Plot ==
Jack Drayton discovers his brother is an attempted murderer but won't expose him out of fear of ruining the family name. He leaves England in secrecy and starts a new life in Australia under the name of Jack Marston. He falls in love with Edith the daughter of a Sydney bookmaker, John Kingdon. He enters his horse, Caloola, in the Melbourne Cup and it wins, despite the attempts of evil Fletcher.

Fletcher later shoots a lady he is trying to blackmail and is chased across town but is eventually cornered in Chinatown and falls to his death. Jack marries Edith and returns to England.

Advertising promoted "great features of the story" as follows:

- The meet at Drayton Court - The hunt breakfast
- The elopement - The attempted murder
- The dismissal of the trainer
- Tattersals Club, Sydney
- Fletcher's Home, North Sydney - The plot to nobble the favorite
- The popular jockey of the day - Les Mayfield goes nap
- The attack on the stables - Caloola knocked out of the batting
- The blackmailer
- The Stables, Newmarket
- Outside the New Hotel
- The morning trial
- The watcher in the bushes
- The race for the derby, Caloola's Vicory
- The Monday Morning papers
- Caloola lame
- The night before the Cup
- Outside the Victorian Club
- Jack Marston faces Fletcher
- Flemington Races
- A world of fashion
- Fletcher warns Wells the jockey
- Wells determination to ride to win
- The Focusing of Wells
- Rides Caloola
- The Race for the Melbourne Cup, the Victory of Caloola
- The Calooa Ball
- Fletcher's revenge - The death of Lady Mayfield
- Detective Smirk on the track - The Chinese den
- The fight on the housetops - The death of Fletcher
- Back in England - a happy reunion

== Cast ==
- The Bland Holt Company
- Martyn Hagen

== Original novel ==
The story was based on an 1891 novel by Nat Gould, The Double Event, or A Tale of the Melbourne Cup. (Gould was a British writer who lived in Australia between 1884 and 1895.) Originally written as With the Tide, it was retitled The Double Event, a reference to the Caulfield and Melbourne Cups. It was the first of Nat Gould's novels to be published in book form (the earliest published stories were Australian newspaper serials) and sold very well. Gould wrote it under commission for The Referee newspaper.

== Play adaptation ==
The novel was successfully adapted for the stage in Australia in 1893 by George Darrell and Bland Holt. The Referee said the production was "splendidly mounted".

The Sun said Darrell's version was "only moderately successful." However Everyones said it had a "good run".

The novel would be adapted for Australian radio in 1938.

== Production ==
The cast included actors from Bland Holt's company (which had disbanded in 1909) who had appeared in a stage production of the play.

Several scenes were shot at Flemington Racecourse in Melbourne. Other scenes were shot at Amalgamated's studio in St Kilda. Assisting Lincoln was Sam Crew.

Filming took place in October 1911.

Richard Fotheringham later wrote "The racecourse story quickly became by far the most common genre of Australian feature film narrative between 1911 and 1949", citing The Double Event as an example, along with films such as Keane of Kalgoorlie and The Cup Winner.

== Release ==
The film was released in Melbourne on Caulfield Cup Day 1911. It was given a premiere screening at Federal Government House in the presence of Lord Dudley, the Governor General.

The Age said the story has been "adapted for picture production by the Amalgamated Pictures Ltd., with considerable siccess from a histrionic point of view."

The Argus declared "For over an hour the audience followed, with keen attention, his exciting story of winning the Victorian Derby and Cup. The overthrow, of the schemes of the villain, and the hero's final triumph, were greeted with loud applause." Table Talk said "The audience were keenly interested in the various exciting scenes placed before them, including the winning of the Derby and Melbourne Cup by Caloola. The defeating of the villain's plans and the final triumph of the hero called forth bursts of applause from the large audience."

Another review in Table Talk stated "This play is well produced and has attracted crowded audiences during the week."

The Melbourne Herald said the film "is drawing well" and "the story as unfolded retains its interest from start to finish, and excitement is around during the two horse races that are introduced."

In November 1911 The Bulletin wrote that "At the Glaciarium (Melb.). last week, the Taits unreeled a long photodrama of "The Double Event", adapted by W.J. Lincoln. This up-to-date local production seems intended to educate the guileless in the ways of horses and the wiles of villains."

An obituary of Lincoln said all his Amalgamated films did "good business".

Several of the cast later appeared in Lincoln's Breaking the News.
