= Lincoln-Cass Films =

Australian film production company

Lincoln Cass Films was a short-lived Australian film production company.

== History ==
The company was formed in July 1913 with authorised capital £4,000 in shares if £1 each. First directors were Henry Dean Stewart, William Foster Dawson, and William Y. M'Kenzie.

Its principal filmmakers were W. J. Lincoln and Godfrey Cass and the managing director of the company was H. Dean Stewart. Charles Wheeler was stage manager and Maurice Bertel was the cinematographer. The company hired actors from Melbourne theatre along with "Australian bush riders". It also occasionally gave live performances. Charles Wheeler wrote some scripts.

Movies were made at a glass-roofed studio in Cole Street in the Melbourne suburb of Elsternwick. Locations were shot in bushland near the town of Healesville. Between July and October 1913 they made eight features, of which only The Sick Stockrider survives today.

Regular cast members were Rod Redgrave, Godfrey Cass, Tom Cannon, George Bryant, Ward Lyons, Charlie Wheeler, Belle Bryant. ""The Yanks said we were crazy," said Cass, "but 1 think we passed them a ' point. How about their serials which run for- months and their so-called million dollar specials It is not often success kills an enterprise, but that is what happened our venture, crude and all as the products were compared with modern films."

According to one report from August 1913:

The idea of the management is to produce the best pictures possible and though the market at this end of the globe is limited, and they are, in consequence, more severely handicapped than American and European producers, they anticipate that the world's markets will accept their work if it is up to the accepted standard of design and treatment. They are convinced that Australia possesses natural beauties equal to those of any part of the globe, some of them very little known even to Australians themselves, and their intention is to procure a class of pictures of sensational interest, coupled with artistic feature, but not to over burden the public with too much of bushranging incidents, for the bush ranger is, after all, only a type, and a limited type, of the figures which moved across the Australian stage of history in its early development.

The Sick Stockrider was the first movie released. It was followed by Moondyne.

In October 1913 The Bulletin recorded "The Lincoln-Cass Films factory is turning out a series of Australian pictures illustrating popular bits of Australian verse (or prose), and is doing it well... There’s a wide field, of Australian verse and short-story illustration, open to the Lincoln-Cass exploiters, and they are working steadily at it. Pretty soon they will have a big repertoire of .popular recitation pictures, and the fat-headed section *of the public that can’t be bothered to read anything in a book will have a light literary education forced upon it."

The company had trouble getting its films seen throughout Australia. Dean Stewart attributed this directly to the influence of Australasian Films and their practice of enforcing block booking. For example, Lincoln Cass did not get a film seen in Sydney until The Road to Ruin (1913), and even then that was only after they set up an exchange in Sydney. Their Melbourne offices were gutted by fire in 1914. The company folded, and their studio was sold to J. C. Williamson Ltd in 1915.

== Filmography ==
1. The Sick Stockrider (August 1913)
2. Moondyne (1 September 1913)
3. The Remittance Man (15 September 1913)
4. Transported (29 September 1913)
5. The Road to Ruin (13 October 1913)
6. The Reprieve (3 November 1913)
7. The Crisis (8 December 1913)
8. The Wreck (filmed 1913, released 21 June 1915)

== See also ==
- List of film production companies
- List of television production companies
