= Godfrey Cass =

Australian actor

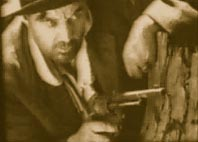
- Godfrey Cass as Ned Kelly in the 1920 film The Kelly Gang.
- Born: 1867
- Died: 14 May 1951 (aged 83–84)
- Father: John Buckley Castieau

Godfrey Cass (1867 – 14 May 1951) was an Australian actor in the silent era. Between 1906 and 1935 he acted in nineteen film roles. He played Ned Kelly three times, and also had roles in a number of other bushranger movies including A Tale of the Australian Bush (1911) and Moondyne (1913).

== Biography ==
The son of the Governor of Melbourne Gaol, John Buckley Castieau (1831–1885), Godfrey Cass was born Godfrey Castieau in 1867, one of seven children. As a child he spent a lot of time around the gaol and met Ned Kelly just before Kelly was hanged.

He began acting in late 1883 or 1884 for J. C. Williamson Ltd. He married Hilda Fraser, with whom he often appeared on stage, in 1894. His peak years as an actor were from 1903 to 1914, usually playing the villain in melodramas.

Cass appeared in his first film in 1911 for the Australian Life Biography Company, and followed it with two more movies for the same company. Two years later he partnered with W. J. Lincoln to make films as Lincoln-Cass Films. The company survived for only one year, but in that time it made eight films, with Cass playing roles in six of them.

He then returned to the stage appearing in Sealed Orders for J. C. Williamson Ltd.

Cass enlisted in the Army for World War I on 27 January 1915, dropping his age by eleven years, and was discharged on 25 August 1917, suffering from shell shock.

He returned to theatre, working as an actor and director. He also appeared in several films, including playing as Ned Kelly in Harry Southwell's The Kelly Gang. He died in 1951.

== Filmography ==
1. A Tale of the Australian Bush (1911) – actor
2. One Hundred Years Ago (1911) – actor
3. A Ticket in Tatts (1911) – actor
4. The Sick Stockrider (1913) – actor, producer
5. Moondyne (1913) – actor, producer
6. The Remittance Man (1913) – actor, producer
7. Transported (1913) – actor, producer
8. The Road to Ruin (1913) – actor, producer
9. The Crisis (1913) – actor, producer
10. The Reprieve (1913) – actor, producer
11. The Wreck (1913) – actor, producer
12. The Kelly Gang (1920) – actor
13. The Hordern Mystery (1920) – actor
14. The Dingo (1923) – actor
15. When the Kellys Were Out (1923) – actor
16. Jewelled Nights (1925) – actor
17. Jungle Woman (1926) – actor
18. The Mystery of a Hansom Cab (1925) – actor
19. The Rushing Tide (1927) – actor
20. Tiger Island (1930) – actor
21. Heritage (1935) – actor
