= Breaking the News (painting) =

1887 painting by John Longstaff

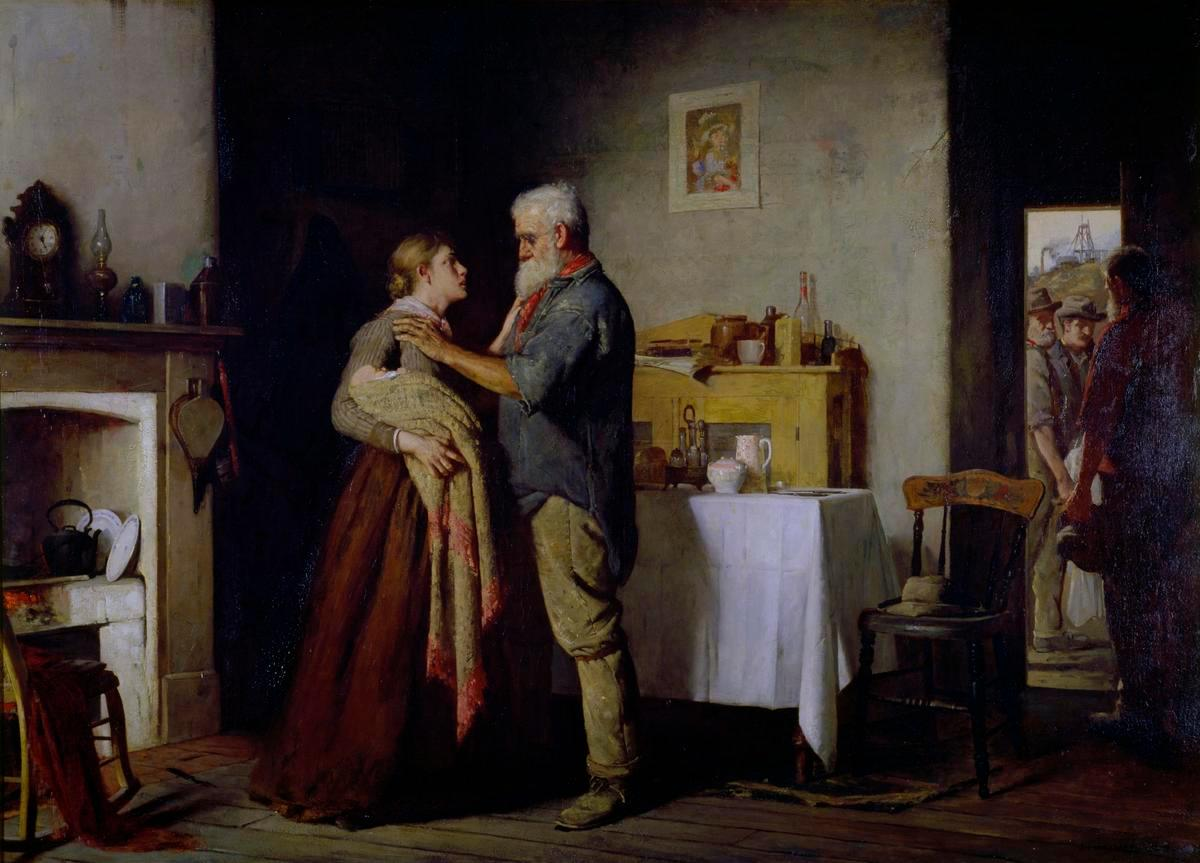
- Artist: John Longstaff
- Year: 1887
- Medium: Oil on canvas
- Dimensions: 109.7 cm × 152.8 cm (45.1 in × 60.2 in)
- Location: Art Gallery of Western Australia; Perth

Breaking the News is an 1887 painting by Australian artist John Longstaff. It shows the interior of a miner's cottage on the Victorian goldfields with an old man breaking the news to a woman of her husband's death in a mining accident. The woman holds an infant in her arms, and two other miners appear in the doorway, carrying the body of the husband on a stretcher. Behind them in the distance stands the mine's headframe. Breaking the News became etched in the popular imagination, and by the 1890s was "known by reproduction in every mining township in Australia".

Painted when Longstaff was still an art student, it won him the National Gallery of Victoria Art School's first travelling scholarship in 1887. The Argus described it as "a vivid and accurate presentment of a familiar incident in Australian life". Only one month after the painting was first exhibited in Melbourne, eighty-one coal miners perished in a gas explosion at the Bulli Mine in New South Wales. The New Australasian Gold Mine disaster, Australia's worst below-ground gold mining disaster, occurred on 12 December 1882 in Creswick, less than twenty kilometres from Longstaff's hometown of Clunes. According to biographer Nina Murdoch, Longstaff's childhood memory of a mining fatality was the direct inspiration for Breaking the News: "the day at Clunes, following the tragic cortège from mine-head to cottage door, he had heard the stricken cry of the young wife at the sight of the stretcher-bearers' burden".

Renowned Australian writer and poet Henry Lawson declared himself a "worshipper" of Longstaff after viewing Breaking the News, and discussed the painting's sentimental and social impact at length in an 1899 essay for The Bulletin titled "If I Could Paint", concluding that he'd "be prouder of a picture like Breaking the News than of a hundred exquisite alleged studies in the "nood"." The following year, The Bulletin co-founder and then-owner of Breaking the News, J. F. Archibald, commissioned Longstaff to paint a portrait of Lawson. Archibald greatly admired the portrait, prompting him to set up a bequest for the Archibald Prize, now Australia's most prestigious prize for portraiture. Longstaff went on to win the Archibald five times.

Breaking the News was the inspiration for a 1912 film of the same name. Directed by W. J. Lincoln and shot near Melbourne, it depicts the flooding of an underground mine and daring attempts to rescue the miners. The film was a commercial success and received favourable reviews from critics. It is now considered a lost film.

Breaking the News was acquired by the Art Gallery of Western Australia in 1933.
