= Millard Johnson =

Millard Johnson may refer to:

- Millard Johnson (Macross), a character in the Macross anime franchise
- Millard Johnson (producer), Australian film producer and exhibitor
