= Reprieve =

Reprieve may refer to:

- In criminal proceedings, the act of postponing the enforcement of a sentence, particularly a death sentence, to allow an appeal; see Pardon § Related concepts
- Reprieve (organisation), a group of organisations working against the death penalty
- Reprieve (album), a 2006 album by Ani DiFranco
- Reprieve (novel), a 2021 novel by James Mattson
- The Reprieve, a 1947 novel by Jean-Paul Sartre
- The Reprieve (1913 film), an Australian melodrama
- The Reprieve (1961 film), a Spanish drama
- Convicts 4, also known as Reprieve, a 1962 American prison film
