= The Double Event =

The Double Event may refer to:

- The Double Event (1911 film), a 1911 Australian film
- The Double Event (1921 film), a 1921 British film
- The Double Event (1934 film), a 1934 British film
