= Transported =

1913 Australian convict melodrama film

- Still from the film
- Directed by: W. J. Lincoln
- Written by: W. J. Lincoln; Godfrey Cass
- Starring: Roy Redgrave
- Cinematography: Maurice Bertel
- Production company: Lincoln-Cass Films
- Release date: 29 September 1913 (Melbourne)
- Running time: 2,500 feet; three reels
- Country: Australia
- Languages: Silent film English intertitles

Transported is an Australian convict melodrama film directed by W. J. Lincoln.

It is considered a lost film.

== Plot ==
In England, Jessie Grey is about to marry Leonard Lincoln but the evil Harold Hawk tries to force her to marry him and she wounds him with a gun. Hawk is arrested and sentenced to imprisonment in Australia. Leonard and Jessie get married and move to Australia. Hawk escapes from gaol and tries to get his revenge by kidnapping Jessie.

According to one contemporary report "The scene opens in an English inn, but through an attack being made on the inn, the drunken scoundrel who attempts to force the heroine's hand is transported to Australia. Two years after the scene is removed to Australia. The villain, escaping from prison, attempts to force- the heroine's hand, and is frustrated by the appearance of her husband. He shoots himself to escape the penalty."

== Cast ==
- Roy Redgrave
- Godfrey Cass
- George Bryant
- Tom Cannan

== Release ==
According to the Prahran Telegraph, Redgrave was "exceptionally good" and "the scenery is brilliant, and some very quaint actions by two of the servants in the household kept the audience ripples of laughter."
