= His Only Chance =

- Directed by: Dick Shortland
- Written by: Captain N.C.P. Conant
- Produced by: William Gibson
- Starring: N.C.P. Conant
- Cinematography: Amalgamated Pictures
- Production company: J. C. Williamson Ltd
- Release date: 23 May 1918 (Melbourne)
- Country: Australia
- Languages: Silent film English intertitles
- Box office: over £1,000

His Only Chance is a 1918 Australian silent film directed by Dick Shortland. It is a high society melodrama. As with Cupid Camouflaged, the film was made to aid fund raising for the Red Cross.

It is considered a lost film.

== Plot ==
A German spy tries to wreck the life of the playboy son of a wealthy family. Believing his only chance to redeem himself is on the battlefield, the young man enlists in the army. According to contemporary advertisements, scenes included:

The Great Ball, the interior of the theatre, the theatregoers' arrival, the gorgeous ballet, the thrilling race between a motor and a train, the railway station, the training stables, the betting ring, well-known turf identities, the interior of the Bank, the tennis party, the military' hospital, the V.A.D.'s at work, the Night Club, the Cabaret, and many other.

== Cast ==
- Captain N.C.P. Conant as German spy
- Captain Newmarb as the young man
- Mrs Cass as adventuress
- Sir Henry Parker as father
- Jack Cannot as bookmaker
- Clyde Cook as punter
- Maie Bird as dancer

== Production ==
The movie was shot in Melbourne, including at Flemington Racecourse and at J. C. Williamson Ltd's film studios, which by that stage were mostly unused. J. C. Williamsons and Amalgamated Pictures were honorary producers, devoting personnel and facilities to the production.

Most of the cast were amateurs from Melbourne society, with some professionals, such as vaudevillian Clyde Cook, in supporting roles.

Writer and star Captain Conant was aide-de-camp to the Governor-General Sir Arthur Stanley. He got the idea to make the film after visiting the set of Cupid Camouflaged, which was also made to raise funds for the Red Cross.

The crew and stock were donated free of charge by Amalgamated Pictures via William Gibson.

== Release ==
The film's premiere took place on 23 May 1918 in the presence of the Governor General. This raised an estimated £1,000. It was subsequently screened in towns throughout Victoria.

Reviewing both this and Cupid Camoflouged, Moving Picture World said that, "from a critical point of view, both subjects are woefully lacking in the essentials of an ordinarily good picture, and the fact they are advertised as "amateur" films does not balance these defects. Plot, acting, photography and direction are mediocre in both pictures."
