= The Road to Ruin (1913 film) =

- Directed by: W. J. Lincoln
- Produced by: W. J. Lincoln; Godfrey Cass
- Starring: Roy Redgrave
- Cinematography: Maurice Bertel
- Production company: Lincoln-Cass Films
- Release date: 13 October 1913
- Running time: 2,700 feet
- Country: Australia
- Languages: Silent film English intertitles

The Road to Ruin is an Australian melodrama film directed by W. J. Lincoln. It was one of the first movies from Lincoln-Cass Films and is considered a lost film.

== Plot ==
Norman Harding, son of magnate Sir Gerald Harding, makes a fortune from stock speculation but borrows too much and faces ruin. His sister Elsie is in love with a bank clerk, Harold Henderson, who Norman persuades to help him in a bank fraud. Henderson becomes drawn into society life and finds himself greatly in debt but is bailed out by Sir Gerald.

== Production ==
The film was shot in Melbourne and features many notable landmarks such as the Royal Botanical Gardens. The movie was supposedly based on fact. Scenes at Caulfield Raceway were taken on 6 September 1913 and included Meritus winning the Doona Trials.

== Cast ==
- Roy Redgrave
- Godfrey Cass
- George Bryant
- Tom Cannan
- Beryl Bryant
- Marion Willis
- Ward Lyons
- Charles Wheeler
- Marcus St John
- John Brunton
- Marion Willis

== Reception ==
According to one review:

The Road to Ruin stands out as one of the most unique dramas of Melbourne life. It is founded on fact, and in the course of the story both interiors and exteriors of the city are included. It discloses some most beautiful scenic bits of Melbourne, including the Botanical Gardens, street scenes and important business houses and a magnificent series of race Sictures taken at Caulfield on Saturday, 6th inst., showing Meritus winning the Doona Trials.

It was the first Lincoln Cass film to be released in Sydney.
