= The Remittance Man =

- Directed by: W. J. Lincoln
- Written by: W. J. Lincoln
- Starring: George Bryant; Godfrey Cass; Roy Redgrave
- Cinematography: Maurice Bertel
- Production company: Lincoln-Cass Films
- Release date: 15 September 1913 (Melbourne)
- Running time: 2,700 feet
- Country: Australia
- Languages: Silent film English intertitles

The Remittance Man is an Australian melodrama film directed by W. J. Lincoln about a thief's reformation.

It was the third film from Lincoln-Cass Films.

It is considered a lost film.

== Plot ==
Nick Deyer sends his eight-year-old daughter Maisie to a ladies' school in Melbourne on the death of his wife. He does not see her for the next ten years however he provides for her well, and spends a lot of money in town, despite never seeming to work. It turns out that he has discovered gold and is hoarding it.

Roger Colville is a bank clerk in Melbourne who has embezzled the bank's funds to tide him over financial difficulties. He meets and falls in love with a grown up Maisie Dwyer who is about to return home to see her father. After Maisie's departure, the bank discovers it has been robbed and Roger goes into hiding. His family in England later settle with the bank.

Roger goes to Maisie's home town and stops some locals fleecing her father. He takes him home and is reunited with Maisie, then discovers Ned's stash of gold. On Christmas Eve Ned goes into town and gets drunk, telling the locals about his gold. Roger tries to steal the gold but is caught by Maisie. He pleads for redemption and Maisie decides to trust him.

Some villains led by Black Dick attack the house looking for gold. However Maisie manages to escape and ride a horse to get help, while the crooks try to beat Roger into saying where the gold is. They eventually find it and are about to leave when the townspeople arrive to capture them. Maisie marries Roger and Ned gives them gold as a dowry.

== Cast ==
- Roy Redgrave
- Godfrey Cass
- George Bryant
- Tom Cannam
- Charles Wheeler
- Beryl Bryant

== Reception ==
A review said the story is "absorbing... and the acting very fine."
