= The Paramount Pictorial =

Series of Australian scenic films

The Paramount Pictorial was a series of scenic films produced by J. C. Williamson Ltd out of their studio in Melbourne.
