= La Revanche (film) =

1916 film by W. J. Lincoln

- Directed by: W. J. Lincoln; G.H. Barnes
- Written by: W. J. Lincoln; Fred Kehoe
- Produced by: W. J. Lincoln
- Starring: Arthur Styan; Agnes Keogh; Stewart Garner
- Cinematography: Maurice Bertel
- Production company: Cinema Films Ltd
- Release date: 10 April 1916 (Melbourne)
- Running time: 4,000 feet
- Country: Australia
- Languages: Silent film English intertitles

La Revanche, also known as The Vengeance, is a 1916 Australian feature-length film directed by W. J. Lincoln about the revenge sought by Belgian friends of Edith Cavell against the Germans during World War I. It was a sequel to Nurse Cavell (1916), using many of the same cast and crew.

It is considered a lost film.

According to Lincoln's obituary in The Bulletin it was one of Lincoln's best films.

== Plot ==
Following the execution of Edith Cavell the Germans continue to practice atrocities. Two friends of Cavell, a Belgian officer, Captain Devreaux, becomes determined to get revenge. Among the German outrages depicted included: the flogging to death of a Belgian man who forgot to salute a German officer; the shooting of an old man who objected to the treatment of Belgian girls; the Kaiser awarding the Iron Cross to a man who murdered an innocent woman. In the end, the spy who denounced Cavell is shot by the Belgians. The German captain involved in the Cavell's execution is shot by a Belgian woman he was assaulting.

The film also depicts the German capture of Wavre in Belgium and its recapture by the Allies.

== Cast ==
- Arthur Styan as Lieutenant Carl
- W. J. Lincoln as the Kaiser
- Agnes Keogh
- Stewart Garner as Captain Devereaux

== Production ==
In March 1916 it was announced in the Melbourne Winner that the film was being prepared:

In the coming film the imaginary characters which figured in the first picture again appear, and what may be called a sequel to the tragic death of the nurse is worked out. As its title suggests, Le Revanche deals with the subsequent movements of the people associated with Nurse Cavell in the previous subject, who are actuated with a desire to avenge the martyr's death. Some sensational incidents are promised, culminating in the death of Captain Karl, the German officer who shot the wounded woman. The original cast has been retained, and the producers state that special attention has been paid to dressing and mounting, which will be on a particularly elaborate scale. Among the new characters which appear in La Ravanche is no less a dignitary than the Kaiser himself.

The film was shot at the studios of J. C. Williamson Ltd. Several of the cast were returned Australian servicemen from the war.

== Reception ==
The film was finished by March 1916. It was seen by a writer from the Melbourne Winner who wrote that:

The story...apart from its improbability, has quite as much to recommend it as dozens of other screen stories, and serves well enough to introduce some fine scenes and give the principals an opportunity to impart strength and detail to characters which in the prior picture were lightly sketched. In the matter of mounting and dressing, everything is a more elaborate scale than has hitherto been the case with locally produced screen subjects, and some striking effects have been achieved. A notable feature of the film is the bright, crisp photography, for which, it is said, natural light was used throughout. Mr Bertelle is to be complimented upon the excellent results obtained.

The movie does not appear to have been particularly successful at the box office, only running for a short time in cinemas. This was supposedly due to a combination of fatigue of the Cavell story, and the French title.
