= The Power of Wealth =

1900 play by W. J. Lincoln

- Original language: English
- Written by: W. J. Lincoln
- Characters: Count Romani; Prince Olivia; Guido Ferrari
- Genre: melodrama
- Setting: Naples; Mount Vesuvius

Premiere
- Date: 18 August 1900
- Place: Sydney

The Power of Wealth is a 1900 play by W. J. Lincoln. It was based on the novel Vendetta by Marie Corelli.

It was produced by Alfred Dampier in 1900 in a production featuring Alfred Rolfe and Lily Dampier.
