= Sam Crews =

Australian theatre practitioner and film director

Sam Crews was an Australian theatre practitioner and film director.

According to W. J. Lincoln, he was the director of the movie The Story of the Kelly Gang, arguably the world's first feature film. This claim has been backed by a number of others.

Others said it was his idea to make the movie.

Crews assisted Lincoln on a number of films.
