= The Reprieve (1913 film) =

- Directed by: W. J. Lincoln
- Written by: W. J. Lincoln
- Produced by: W. J. Lincoln; Godfrey Cass
- Starring: The Lincoln Cass Famous Picture Artists
- Cinematography: Maurice Bertel
- Production company: Lincoln-Cass Films
- Release date: 3 November 1913 (Melbourne)
- Running time: 2,500 feet or 4,000 feet
- Country: Australia
- Languages: Silent film English intertitles

The Reprieve is a 1913 Australian melodrama film directed by W. J. Lincoln about a man on trial for killing his unfaithful wife. It is considered a lost film. Contemporary reviews were positive.

== Plot ==
Richard Gannon discovers his wife Amy has been cheating on him with a man called Jim Williams and accidentally kills her in a fit of anger by pushing her over a cliff. He is arrested and sentenced to death but the judge recommends mercy and asks the Home Secretary for a reprieve.

The Home Secretary at first refuses, but when he mistakenly comes to believe that his own wife is unfaithful with a former lover, he realises how easy it would have been to kill her.

After this, he grants a reprieve for Gannon and resolves to show his wife more affection.

The chapter headings were:

- Condemned to Death.
- The Power of Love.
- Leave my House, you Scoundrel.
- Should a faithless woman be destroyed.
- I have killed Her.
- The Vigil of the Night.
- A story that will hold you spell-bound.
- You are no better than Richard Gannon, the man you refuse to reprieve.

== Cast ==
- Roy Redgrave
- Beryl Bryant
- Godfrey Cass
- George Bryant
- Tom Cannam
- Violet Grey
- Ward Lyons
- Charles Wheeler
- John Brunton
- Jessie Brown

== Production ==
The film was the fifth production from Lincoln Cass.
