= The Crisis (1913 film) =

- Directed by: W. J. Lincoln
- Written by: Charles Wheeler; W. J. Lincoln
- Based on: the painting The Crisis by Frank Dicksee
- Starring: The Lincoln Cass Performers
- Cinematography: Maurice Bertel
- Production company: Lincoln-Cass Films
- Release dates: 27 October 1913 (Melbourne) 1 December 1913 (Sydney)
- Running time: 3,000 feet
- Country: Australia
- Languages: Silent film English intertitles

The Crisis is an Australian melodrama film directed by W. J. Lincoln. It was inspired by a painting, The Crisis by Frank Dicksee, and is considered a lost film.

== Plot ==
Nellie Owen is happily married to fisherman John, with whom she has a child, until a philanderer, Frank, convinces her that her husband is unfaithful. She runs away to the city with Frank, where she assists him extracting money from the rich in society, but after a while is consumed by guilt and wants to return home. After an argument with Frank, she arrives in time to help nurse her sick child through a serious illness, and is reunited with her forgiving husband.

== Cast ==
- Roy Redgrave
- George Bryant
- Beryl Bryant
- Tom Cannam
- Kathleen Lindgren

== Plot ==
The painting was purchased by the Melbourne Art Gallery in 1891.

== Reception ==
The Referee said the "scenic settings ... are very fine including some effective seascapes."
