= Amalgamated Pictures =

Australian film production company

Amalgamated Pictures Ltd was a film exchange company in Australia.

For a time it was also a short-lived Australian film production company. Although none of its output has survived, it has been written that "judging by subjects chosen, the average length (4,000 feet) and the scale of Amalgamated's productions, the company was second only to Spencer's Pictures in its resolve to build a quality reputation for Australian features" in the Australian film boom of 1911–12.

== History of the production company ==
Amalgamated Pictures
- Type: Film Production company
- Industry: Entertainment
- Founded: 4 May 1911; 115 years ago
- Founders: John Tait, Nevin Tait, Millard Johnson, William Gibson
- Defunct: 1912; 114 years ago
- Fate: Merged with West's Pictures and Spencer's Pictures to form General Film Company of Australasia.

The Amalgamated Picture Company Ltd was formed on 4 March 1911 by the brothers John and Nevin Tait, and Millard Johnson and William Gibson, with capital of £100,000. This team had previously collaborated on The Story of the Kelly Gang and Robbery Under Arms.

Contemporary newspaper reports announcing the launch said the company had:

The purpose of promoting the finest and best class of picture Entertainment yet seen in the Australian colonies. With the capital at command, no endeavour will be spared to present to their patrons a standard of show that will eclipse all similar enterprises within the province of our own hemisphere. One of the main endeavours of the amalgamation will be to procure only the very best picture subjects procurable on the world's market. A feature will likewise be made of special and original produced Australian dramas, similar to those that have already proved so hugely successful. The management, in making a public statement of their intentions, anticipate a large share of public support.

They produced numerous newsreels and feature films, with their chief creative talent being the writer-director W. J. Lincoln and cameraman Orrie Perry. They also owned or had a financial interest in a number of theatres. Prouse Knows worked as Lincoln's assistant.

The bulk of Amalgamated's movies were shot at a studio in Fitzroy St, St Kilda. Locations would be shot at Healesville, Sandringham, and other areas nearby.

At one stage, 80–90 people were employed by the company. All but one of its features was adapted from a novel, song, story or stage play. Acting talent was drawn from the stage.

In 1912, Amalgamated Pictures merged with West's Pictures, and then Spencer's Pictures, to create the General Film Company of Australasia. In November 1912, this company merged with the Greater J. D. Williams Amusement Co., a large exhibition and film supply outfit, to create "the combine" of Union Theatres and Australasian Films.

Amalgamated Pictures continued as a company within The Combine, but it no longer produced movies.

== Filmography ==
- After Sundown (1911)
- The Mystery of a Hansom Cab (1911)
- The Luck of Roaring Camp (1911)
- Called Back (1911)
- The Lost Chord (1911)
- The Bells (1911)
- The Double Event (1911)
- Breaking the News (1912)
- Rip Van Winkle (1912)
- His Only Chance (1918)
