= George Bryant (actor) =

Australian actor (1862–1943)

George Edwin Bryant (1862 – 26 November 1943) was an Australian actor in the silent era. Between 1913 and 1936 he acted in eleven film roles, including starring roles in The Sick Stockrider and Moondyne.

Bryant died in his home in South Yarra, Victoria on 26 November 1943 he was 81.

== Filmography ==
Year	Film
1913	Transported
1913	The Sick Stockrider
1913	The Road to Ruin
1913	The Reprieve
1913	The Remittance Man
1913	Moondyne
1913	The Crisis
1916	Officer 666
1925	Jewelled Nights
1926	The Sealed Room
1936	Rangle River
