= The Wreck (1913 film) =

- Directed by: W. J. Lincoln
- Written by: W. J. Lincoln
- Based on: poem by Adam Lindsay Gordon
- Cinematography: Maurice Bertel
- Production company: Lincoln Cass
- Release date: 21 June 1915
- Country: Australia
- Languages: Silent film English intertitles

The Wreck is an Australian film directed by W. J. Lincoln based on a poem by Adam Lindsay Gordon about the ride to help by a farmhand who has witnessed a shipwreck. It is considered a lost film.

The movie was made in 1913 by Lincoln Cass in Melbourne. However it was not released until 1915 in Sydney. W. J. Lincoln later made a film of Gordon's life, The Life's Romance of Adam Lindsay Gordon (1916).

The film screened in Cairns in 1916.
