= J. C. Williamson's =

Australian theatrical management company

J. C. Williamson's, formerly Williamson, Garner, & Musgrove and Williamson and Musgrove, was an Australian theatrical management company and theatre owner. With its beginnings in the theatrical productions of J. C. Williamson and his partners in the nineteenth and early twentieth century, the company J. C. Williamson Limited was established in 1910. Colloquially known as The Firm or JCW, the company dominated Australian commercial theatre in the twentieth century and at one time was described as the largest theatrical firm in the world. It closed under financial pressure in 1976.

== History ==
=== Background ===
Williamson, Garner, & Musgrove was a company, colloquially termed "the Triumvirate", formed by J. C. Williamson, Arthur Garner, and George Musgrove in 1882, after they had worked together since November 1881 to jointly lease the Theatre Royal, Melbourne and Theatre Royal, Sydney. In 1886, the company leased the Princess Theatre in Melbourne, and Theatre Royal in Adelaide. Williamson was the senior partner and managed the actors and companies, while Musgrove was responsible for production, and Garner concentrated on finances. They dissolved the firm in 1890 after Williamson and Musgrove had personal disagreements, but the two of them formed the company Williamson and Musgrove two years later, which existed until 1899.

=== Early years ===
1921 production

In 1904, J. C. Williamson entered into a partnership with George Tallis, his Melbourne manager, and Gustave Ramaciotti, his legal adviser. The limited liability company J. C. Williamson Limited was registered in July 1910, with shareholders including Williamson, Tallis and Ramaciotti among others. Actor-producer Hugh J. Ward purchased an interest in November 1910. In 1911 they absorbed rival company Clarke and Meynell; Clarke became a director and Meynell managing director. The company soon achieved outstanding successes with tours by H. B. Irving and Nellie Melba; the latter and Williamson earned £46,000 profit each from her tour. Williamson successfully opposed an application by Australian actors to form a union in 1913.

After Williamson died in 1913, the company continued to operate under various managing directors, including Ward who resigned in 1922, and for many years, Sir George Tallis, and then the five Tait brothers, Charles, John, James Nevin, Edward and Frank. In 1920, their production company, J. & N. Tait, merged with the J. C. Williamson company. The firm continued to present musical comedy and operetta, including the extremely successful The Maid of the Mountains, beginning in 1917. Gladys Moncrieff was a hit as Teresa, appearing in over 2,800 performances of the musical. The firm's short-lived film production company, the J. C. Williamson Film Company, produced a number of silent feature films from 1914 to 1918. It later made the movie The Hayseeds.

=== Later years ===
The company's activities extended to London's West End, where it produced, among others, seasons of the musicals High Jinks (in 1916), and Mr. Cinders, together with the revue Coo-ee! and the plays Little Accident and Coquette, in 1929. In 1930, James Nevin became manager of the Williamson London office. In 1937, New Zealand businessman Sir John McKenzie became chairman, and Ernest C. Rolls was appointed to the board and made managing director and principal producer of J. C. Williamson. By 1938, the Tait brothers were running Williamson's property and investment company. In 1941, Viola Wilson, a former principal soprano with the D'Oyly Carte Opera Company who had toured with the Williamson company beginning in 1940, married Frank Tait, later becoming an artistic director of the company. By 1943, the brothers were also running J. C. Williamson Theatres, Ltd., and Frank eventually became managing director. He died in 1965.

In addition to operating its film company and its property and investments company, J. C. Williamson Ltd. (the name changed many times over the years), continued to produce seasons of Gilbert and Sullivan operas, seasons of operetta, musical comedy, straight plays, pantomimes and occasional musical revues, and later grand opera, ballet seasons, and concert tours by visiting celebrity singers and musicians, at the many theatres that it owned or leased throughout Australia and New Zealand. Following World War II, the company presented long-running productions of new American musicals, beginning with Annie Get Your Gun starring Evie Hayes which opened at Melbourne's His Majesty's Theatre in July 1947. Plays produced by Williamson's in this period included:

- Blue Mountain Melody (1934)
- Lady in Danger (1944)
- Mischief in the Air (1944)
- Pommy (1954)
- The Multi-Coloured Umbrella (1957)
- The Piccadilly Bushman (1961)
- The Sentimental Bloke (1962)
- The Season at Sarsaparilla (1963)
- Who'll Come A-Waltzing (1963)

In 1976, the company closed and leased out its name.

== Records ==
The National Library of Australia acquired the records of J. C. Williamson's in 1979, which are available as part of its Performing arts ephemera collection.
