= Orrie Perry =

- Born: Orizaba George Perry; 14 September 1888
- Died: 29 December 1950 (aged 62)
- Occupation: Cinematographer
- Father: Joseph Perry

Orizaba George "Orrie" Perry (14 September 1888 – 29 December 1950) was an Australian cinematographer who worked for Amalgamated Pictures. He was the son of Australian film pioneer Joseph Perry. Perry had a long career in the Australian film industry.

== Filmography ==
- The Scottish Covenanters (1909)
- After Sundown (1911)
- The Mystery of a Hansom Cab (1911)
- The Luck of Roaring Camp (1911)
- Called Back (1911)
- The Lost Chord (1911)
- The Bells (1911)
- The Double Event (1911)
- Rip Van Winkle (1912)
