= Moondyne =

1879 novel by John Boyle O'Reilly and 1913 Australian film

- Author: John Boyle O'Reilly
- Language: English
- Genre: Novel
- Publisher: P. J. Kennedy
- Publication date: 1879
- Publication place: United States
- Media type: Print (Hardback & Paperback)

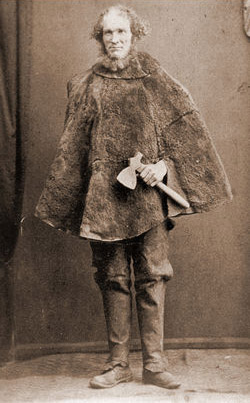
Moondyne Joe

Moondyne is an 1879 novel by John Boyle O'Reilly. It is loosely based on the life of the Western Australian convict escapee and bushranger Moondyne Joe. It is believed to be the first ever fictional novel set in Western Australia. In 1913, Melbourne film director W. J. Lincoln made a silent film of the same name.

== Background ==
O'Reilly was a Fenian revolutionary who was transported as a convict to Western Australia. After thirteen months in Western Australia, O'Reilly escaped the colony on board the American whaling ship Gazelle. He arrived in America in 1869 and settled in Boston, where he established himself as a respected journalist, newspaper editor, novelist and poet, and later helped orchestrate the 1876 Catalpa rescue of six Fenian convicts from Western Australia.

Around the time O'Reilly was stationed in Bunbury in 1868, he had begun to hear about the exploits of convict Joseph Bolitho Johns aka Moondyne Joe, who at that time was still on the run from authorities after escaping from Fremantle Prison in 1867. It has been rumoured that O'Reilly's subsequent escape in 1869 was partly due to inspiration from Johns' escape stories. A week after O'Reilly absconded from his convict camp in February, 1869, Johns was captured at the cellars for Houghton Winery in Perth, he was sent back to prison but was given a ticket of leave in 1871.

At the time when O'Reilly published Moondyne, Johns had just married Louisa Hearn in Fremantle and was prospecting for gold near Southern Cross. He most likely never knew for the rest of his life that he was the main inspiration for the novel.

== Publication details ==
The novel Moondyne originally appeared as a serial in O'Reilly's newspaper The Pilot in 1878, under the title Moondyne Joe. Applauded by critics, it was published and republished under a variety of titles including:

- Moondyne Joe: A Story from the Underworld
- Moondyne: A Tale of Convict Life in Western Australia
- Moondyne: A Story of Life in West Australia
- Moondyne: An Australian Tale
- Moondyne, or, The Mystery of Mr Wyville
- The Golden Secret, or Bond and Free
- The Moondyne
- A Tale of Bush and Convict Life
- An Múindín (Irish-language translation, 1931).

== Plot summary ==
Moondyne Joe is a convict who escapes after being victimised and mistreated by a cruel penal system. While on the run he is befriended by a tribe of Aboriginal people who share with him their secret of a huge gold mine. Joe uses his new-found wealth to return to England and become a respected humanitarian under the assumed name Wyville. Recognised as possessing expertise in penal reform, he is ultimately sent back to Western Australia to help reform the colony's penal system. In the course of this he becomes involved in several subplots including the case of a young woman named Alice Walmsley who has been wrongly convicted of murdering her own child. Wyville/Moondyne succeeds in saving Alice from false imprisonment, helps to reform Western Australia's penal system, and achieves a number of other admirable ends before dying trying to save Alice and Sheridan from bushfires.

== 1913 film ==
See Moondyne (film)

== Legacy ==
In 2019, a festival was held in Fremantle to commemorate the 150th anniversary of O'Reilly's escape titled the Moondyne Walk, where a series of different readers would read out a chapter of the novel. The list of readers included former Western Australian premier Peter Dowding, epidemiologist Fiona Stanley, author and journalist Peter FitzSimons and actor Peter Rowsthorn.

== See also ==
- Moondyne (disambiguation)
