= Maurice Bertel =

Maurice Bertel (1871 – 17 May, 1930) was a French-born cinematographer who worked mostly in Australia. He moved to Australia in 1890 and learned his trade with local film companies. From 1907 he supervised the weekly newsreel made by Pathe Freres in Melbourne, staying with them for a number of months when they merged with Australasian Films in 1913. He then went to work for Lincoln-Cass Films and J. C. Williamson Ltd on their feature films, before joining Herschell's in Melbourne as a technical adviser.

== Filmography ==
- The Sick Stockrider (1913)
- Moondyne (1913)
- The Remittance Man (1913)
- Transported (1913)
- The Road to Ruin (1913)
- The Crisis (1913)
- The Reprieve (1913)
- The Wreck (1913)
