= W. J. Lincoln =

Australian playwright, film director and screenwriter

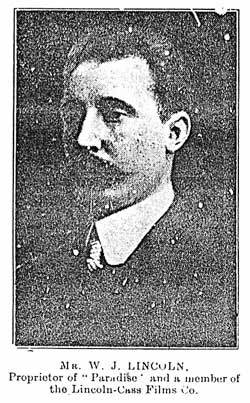
- Lincoln, c. 1913
- Born: William Joseph Lincoln; 1870; Melbourne
- Died: 18 August 1917 (aged 46–47); Sydney
- Occupation: Film director
- Years active: 1911–1916
- Spouse: Pearl Ireland (m. 1896–1917; his death)

William Joseph Lincoln (1870 – 18 August 1917) was an Australian playwright, theatre manager, film director and screenwriter in the silent era. He produced, directed and/or wrote 23 films between 1911 and 1916.

One obituary called him "undoubtedly the pioneer of the Australian picture-producing industry".

Another obituary echoed these sentiments, adding that:

His faith in the possibilities of Australia as a centre of' activity in moving picture production was unbounded, and for many years past he had devoted his energies chiefly to the realisation of this conviction. In common with others with whom he was at different periods associated in the making of film stories, Mr Lincoln's work was carried on under conditions that might well have daunted the most sanguine. That he made admirable use of the materials that lay to his hand is generally admitted, and in some of his earlier productions he achieved a technical standard that was little if at all inferior to the output of the overseas studios at that time.

Film historians Graham Shirley and Brian Adams wrote that Lincoln's films "were more like stage tableaux than films. However, with the right ingredients at their disposal the best of Lincoln's early productions were well-received".

== Early life and career ==
Lincoln was born in Melbourne, the only son of Thomas and Esther Lincoln, and was brought up in St Kilda. Thomas Lincoln was a middle class merchant, a partner in the firm Lincoln, Stuart and Company.

=== Playwright ===
Lincoln began as a playwright his first credit seemingly One Summer's Eve (1890). He wrote the play The Bush King which debuted in London in 1893 and in Melbourne in 1894. This play would later be rewritten by Alfred Dampier, a version which premiered in 1901 and became very successful over the following decade, being adapted into the popular film Captain Midnight, the Bush King (1911).

Lincoln wrote the one act plays After Sundown (1896) and An Affair of Honour (1897). He wrote another play The Power of Wealth (1900) which was also performed by Dampier, though with less success than The Bush King. He wrote the book to the pantomime Little Red Riding Hood. Lincoln appears to have worked with the Alfred Dampier Company from 1901 to 1904.

=== Manager ===
Lincoln first became involved with the film industry for J. C Williamson, managing his Anglo-American Bio-Tableau in 1904 to 1905.

He then managed the Australasian tour of the Gaiety Company for Williamson. While doing this he received notice to meet up with Clement Mason who had film of the Russo-Japanese War. Lincoln toured with this and some other films throughout Western Australia. It was a massive success with the public.

According to Lincoln's obituary "He worked with Meynell, Gunn and Clarke in their early days" (the Meynell and Gunn Dramatic Company). He did this from 1906 to 1909. In 1907 Harold Bessett went bankrupt. He blamed Lincoln, his manager, but Lincoln denied this. He then became the theatrical manager of Miss Lancashire Ltd which toured Australia; this production starred Florence Baines. Lincoln also worked as an advertising copywriter for The Bulletin.

According to one newspaper report he produced and directed the feature film The Story of the Kelly Gang (1907) but this seems doubtful. Lincoln himself attributed the direction to Sam Crews.

According to historian Mary Bateman, "By 1909, he [Lincoln] was well versed in almost every facet of the theatrical and moving picture world. He was not, however, noted for his business acumen. One of his difficulties, wrote Theatre, was detail; he could never itemize an expense account... [He] had a good sense of humour. He was probably at his best writing plays and promoting companies in the grand manner, and forgetting about the tedious detail."

In 1909 Lincoln became manager of the Paradise of Living Pictures movie theatre in St Kilda, Melbourne, one of the earliest moving picture palaces in Melbourne. He had begun to write and direct films for show in the theatre.

== Filmmaker ==
=== Amalgamated Pictures ===
Lincoln made his film debut as director and writer with It Is Never Too Late to Mend (1911), based on a popular play and novel, for the Tait brothers. They appointed him director of their new company, Amalgamated Pictures, for whom he made nine films over the next year most based on play adaptations of a novel: The Mystery of a Hansom Cab (1911), The Luck of Roaring Camp (1911), Called Back (1911), The Lost Chord (1911), The Bells (1911), The Double Event (1911), After Sundown (1911) (based on Lincolns own play, but the film was not commercially released), Breaking the News (1911) and Rip Van Winkle (1912). Apart from the not-released After Sundown the films did good business. During this time Lincoln continued to manage the Paradise Gardens.

In later writing about these films Lincoln said "I am... in a somewhat awkward position in appraising their merits, but in justice to those who assisted in these productions, I may say that their work under discouraging conditions, Is entitled to the highest commendation."

A writer said of It Is Never Too Late to Mend, Mystery of the Hansom Cab and Called Back that "They were very cheaply produced (the cost per film was between £300 and £400), and Johnson and Gibson must have done well out of them, although they were not first-class. How could they be?"

Another article wrote Lincoln "had an undoubted capacity for .writing scenarios, and he had an excellent dramatic company, so that he produced quite a number of photo-plays. There were some big fakes in then occasionally, as when the St. Kilda railway station did duty for the great Euston station of London in Called Back.

The Taits withdrew from film production around 1912 to focus on importing and distributing overseas films, which was cheaper than making local movies. In 1912 Lincoln became publicity manager of Amalgamated. The following year he bought out Amalgamated Picture's interest in the "Paradise" theatre.

A 1913 article called Lincoln "a captivating conversationalist". Mary Bateman says around this time that "It is logical, given Lincoln's film experience and undoubted talent as a writer and producer, and his knowledge, that there was no outlet for his creative ability within his present position."

=== Lincoln-Cass Film Company ===
In 1913 Lincoln partnered with Godfrey Cass to make films as the Lincoln-Cass Film Company. According to a contemporary report "Mr. Lincoln has the literary taste, the business qualifications, and wide experience as a showman to justify him in taking this step." Lincoln said "they were Australians, and hopeful of interesting the public in Australian pictures. With the interest of the public and the generosity of the managers, they hoped to succeed, and to illustrate much which was interesting in Australia and its features."

The company survived for only one year, but in that time it made eight films, most of which Lincoln directed. These were The Sick Stockrider (1913), based on the poem by Adam Lindsay Gordon, The Remittance Man, Transported, The Road to Ruin (1913), The Crisis (1913), and The Reprieve (1913). Australian films were now struggling to compete with American product – according to one report, the meteoric progress made in the development of moving pictures in America, due chiefly to the exploiting of the growing popular taste for this form of entertainment by wealthy organisations, quickly left the Australian product behind."

=== J. C. Williamson Ltd ===
Lincol n later worked for J. C. Williamson Ltd when they moved into film production.

Lincoln wrote the scripts for Within Our Gates (1915), directed by Frank Harvey, and Within the Law (1916), directed by Monte Luke. Lone Hand wrote that in Within Our Gates Lincoln " succeeded in producing a strong story of German intrigue and cunning, of patriotism and valor all happening within our gates. Startling as the story is, it is made to appear quite feasible."

Lincoln was originally supposed to direct for Williamsons as well but according to Mary Bateman, "Lincoln's drinking appears to have been uncontrollable for a period during his association with Williamson's, and there were fears he would be unable to fulfil his obligations to them." His caused him to be removed as director of Get-Rich-Quick Wallingford (1916); actor Fred Niblo took over the job, launching Niblo's considerable career as director. Niblo directed Officer 666 for Williamson's with Lincoln working as writer.

In October 1915 it was announced that Lincoln "has been in poor health lately, and has had to take things quietly. He is contemplating spending a few weeks at one of the mountain resorts, and while there will looks over, manuscripts of some big film, factories which are under consideration for future production."

Lincoln recovered sufficiently to write and direct Nurse Cavell (1916) and La Revanche (1916).

=== Later years ===
Lincoln later formed Lincoln-Barnes Productions in partnership with G.H. Barnes, directing The Life's Romance of Adam Lindsay Gordon (1916). The shoot was not easy and Lincoln was unwell during filming. However Mary Bateman later wrote, "Lincoln was a talented director and this film shows the maturity he had reached in film production" adding that the movie "has a haunting beauty. The long camera shots, interior lighting and sophisticated direction mark him as a particularly sensitive and advanced director for that time."

Lincoln and Barnes would up in litigation against Amalgamated Pictures in 1917.

=== Death ===
Lincoln's drinking got worse and he died in Sydney on 18 August 1917. At the time of his death he was working on an adaptation of the stage play The Worst Woman in London called The Worst Woman in Sydney. It was unclear if this was a play or a film script.

An obituary described Lincoln as:

One of the stoutest champions of Australian moving picture production. Although his sanguine views of the business as a profitable investment were not shared by all his friends, it was conceded by everyone who kn6w him, that he had the courage of his convictions. In the early years of moving picture development, as a medium for dramatic expression, Mr. Lincoln achieved success as a maker of photodramas. Undaunted by the-fact that studio facilities were confined to improvisations of one sort and another, that practical experience was only to be acquired by spending money and risking failure, he stuck to his work, and secured results that, were the more to be commended in that they were obtained under such' discouraging conditions. That Australia could not keep pace in the general upward trend in production, was not the fault of Lincoln and others who strove to establish the industry here.

Lincoln's Bulletin obituary said his best films were The Sick Stockrider, After Sundown, Le Revanche, The Bells and Adam Lindsay Gordon.

== Personal life ==
Lincoln married Pearl Ireland (d. 4 February 1943) in 1896 – they were described as "a runaway match". They had one child, a daughter Marguerite ("Madge") (1897–1972). His daughter married in 1923.

== Filmography ==
- Moonlite (1910) – based on his play Captain Moonlite
- Captain Midnight, the Bush King (9 Feb 1911) – based on his play

=== Amalgamated Pictures ===
- It Is Never Too Late to Mend (7 January 1911) – based on his stage adaptation of novel, writer, director
- The Mystery of a Hansom Cab (4 March 1911) – director
- The Luck of Roaring Camp (24 March 1911) – writer, director
- Called Back (15 April 1911) – writer, director
- The Lost Chord (13 May 1911) – director
- The Bells (7 Oct 1911) – based on his stage adaptation of the play, writer, director
- The Double Event (21 Oct 1911) – writer, director
- After Sundown (filmed around Oct 1911 but not released) – writer, director
- Breaking the News (16 March 1912) – writer, director
- Rip Van Winkle (6 April 1912) – director

=== Lincoln Cass Films ===
- The Sick Stockrider (18 Aug 1913) – director
- Moondyne (1 Sept 1913) – director
- The Remittance Man (15 Sept 1913) – director
- Transported (29 Sept 1913) – director
- The Road to Ruin (13 Oct 1913) – director
- The Crisis (27 Oct 1913) – director
- The Reprieve (3 Nov 1913) – director
- The Wreck (filmed 1913, released 21 June 1915) – director

=== JC Williamson Ltd ===
- Within Our Gates (19 July 1915) (aka Deeds That Won Gallipoli) – writer
- Within the Law (10 Jan 1916) – writer
- Nurse Cavell (21 Feb 1916) – director, writer, producer
- Get-Rich-Quick Wallingford (21 Feb 1916) – writer
- Officer 666 (1 April 1916) – writer

=== Lincoln-Barnes ===
- La Revanche (10 Apri 1916) – director, writer, producer
- The Life's Romance of Adam Lindsay Gordon (4 Sept 1916) – writer, producer, director

== Select theatre credits ==
- One Summer's Eve (1890) – writer
- The Bush King (1893) – writer; rewritten by Lincoln and Alfred Dampier (as Adam Pierre) in 1900
- After Sundown (1896) – writer of one act play
- An Affair of Honour (1897) – one act play, writer
- The Power of Wealth (1900) – writer
- Little Red Riding Hood (pantomime) (1903) – writer of the book

== Sources ==
- Bateman, Mary (June–July 1980). "W. J. Lincoln". Cinema Papers. pp. 172–174.
