= John Tait (entrepreneur) =

Australian film and theatre entrepreneur (1871-1955)

John Henry Tait
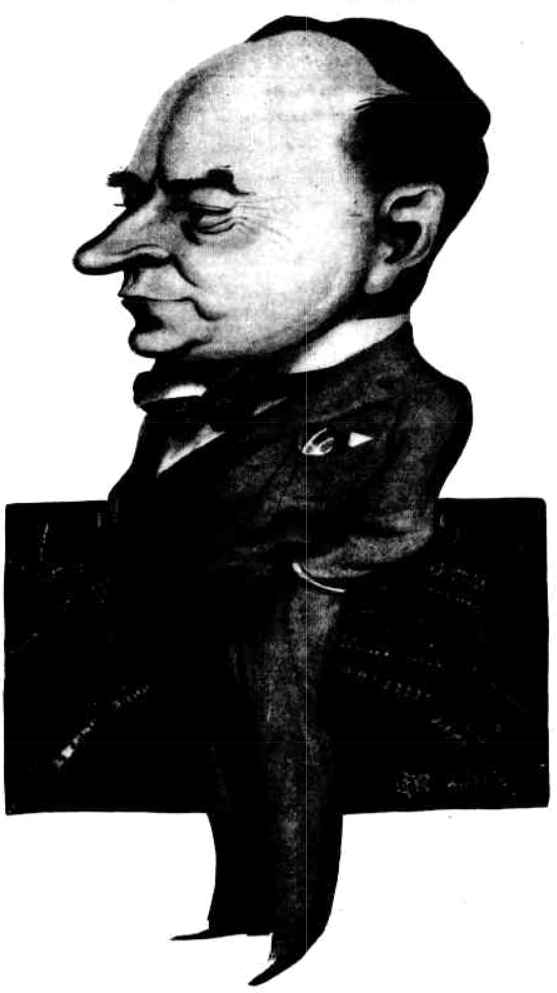
- 1927 caricature by Reynolds
- Born: 21 August 1871; Castlemaine, Victoria, Australia
- Died: 23 September 1955 (aged 84)
- Occupations: Film and theatre entrepreneur
- Family: Charles Tait, Nevin Tait

John Henry Tait (21 August 1871 – 23 September 1955) was an Australian film and theatre entrepreneur who often worked with his brothers Charles, Nevin, Edward and Frank.

== Biography ==
Tait was born in Castlemaine, Victoria, the son of John Turnbull Tait (1830–1902), a tailor from Scalloway, Shetland Islands, Scotland, and his English wife Sarah, née Leeming. He migrated to Victoria in 1862 and settled at Castlemaine where he married Sarah. They had nine children: including Charles (1868–1933), John (1871–1955), James Nevin (1876–1961), Edward Joseph (1878–1947) and Frank Samuel (1883–1965) (later Sir Frank). John was educated at Castlemaine State School before the Taits moved in about 1879 to Richmond, a suburb of Melbourne, Victoria.

John Henry Tait originally worked as a lawyer before going into the theatre. He managed Dame Nellie Melba's 1902 tour of Australia for George Musgrove. He later became a concert promoter. In March 1911, Tait and his brother Nevin, and Millard Johnson and William Gibson merged their film interests in Amalgamated Pictures and became a noted theatre producer.
