= Nevin Tait =

Australian concert promoter and film producer (1876-1961)

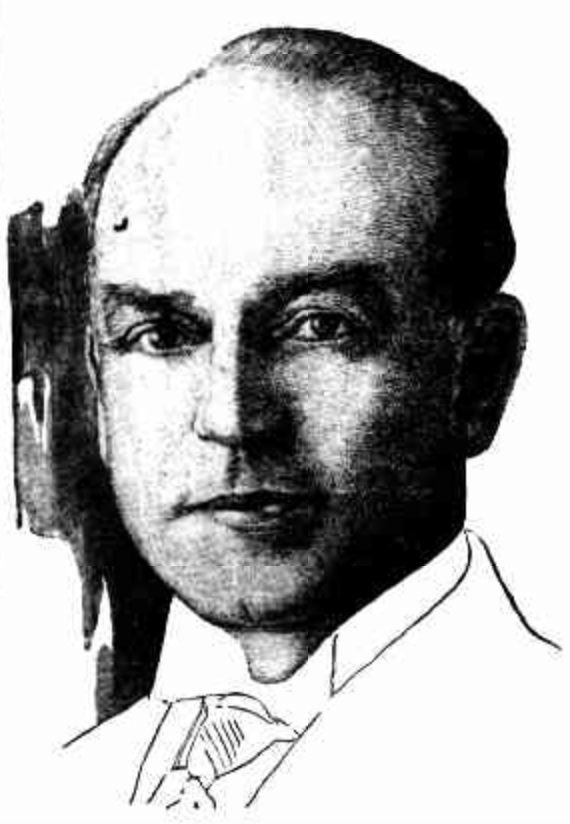
- James Nevin Tait, c. 1928
- Born: James Nevin Tait; 27 June 1876; Castlemaine, Victoria, Australia
- Died: 7 March 1961 (aged 84); London, England
- Occupations: Concert promoter; Film producer

James Nevin Tait (27 June 1876 – 7 March 1961) was an Australian concert promoter and film producer who often collaborated with his brothers Charles and John, and had a lengthy association with J.C. Williamson Theatre.

He travelled to London and engaged numerous stars to tour Australia including Harry Lauder, John McCormack, Emma Albani, Clara Butt, Kennerley Rumford

== Biography ==
Nevin Tait was born in Castlemaine, Victoria, the son of John Turnbull Tait (1830–1902), a tailor from Scalloway, Shetland Islands, Scotland, and his English wife Sarah, née Leeming. Tait Snr. had migrated to Victoria in 1862 and settled at Castlemaine, where he married Sarah.

The Tait's had nine children; five of which were involved in show business including Charles (1868–1933), John (1871–1955), James Nevin (1876–1961), Edward Joseph Tait (1878–1947) and Frank Samuel (1883–1965) (later Sir Frank). The Taits moved in about 1879 to Richmond, a suburb of Melbourne, Victoria.

Nevin started his career as a stockbroker before moving into concert promotion and film production including the films The Story of the Kelly Gang and Robbery Under Arms. In March 1911, brothers John and Nevin, and Millard Johnson and William Gibson merged their film interests in Amalgamated Pictures. In 1916 he moved to London to represent his brothers, where he died in 1961.
