= William Gibson (producer) =

Australian film producer and exhibitor

William Gibson OBE
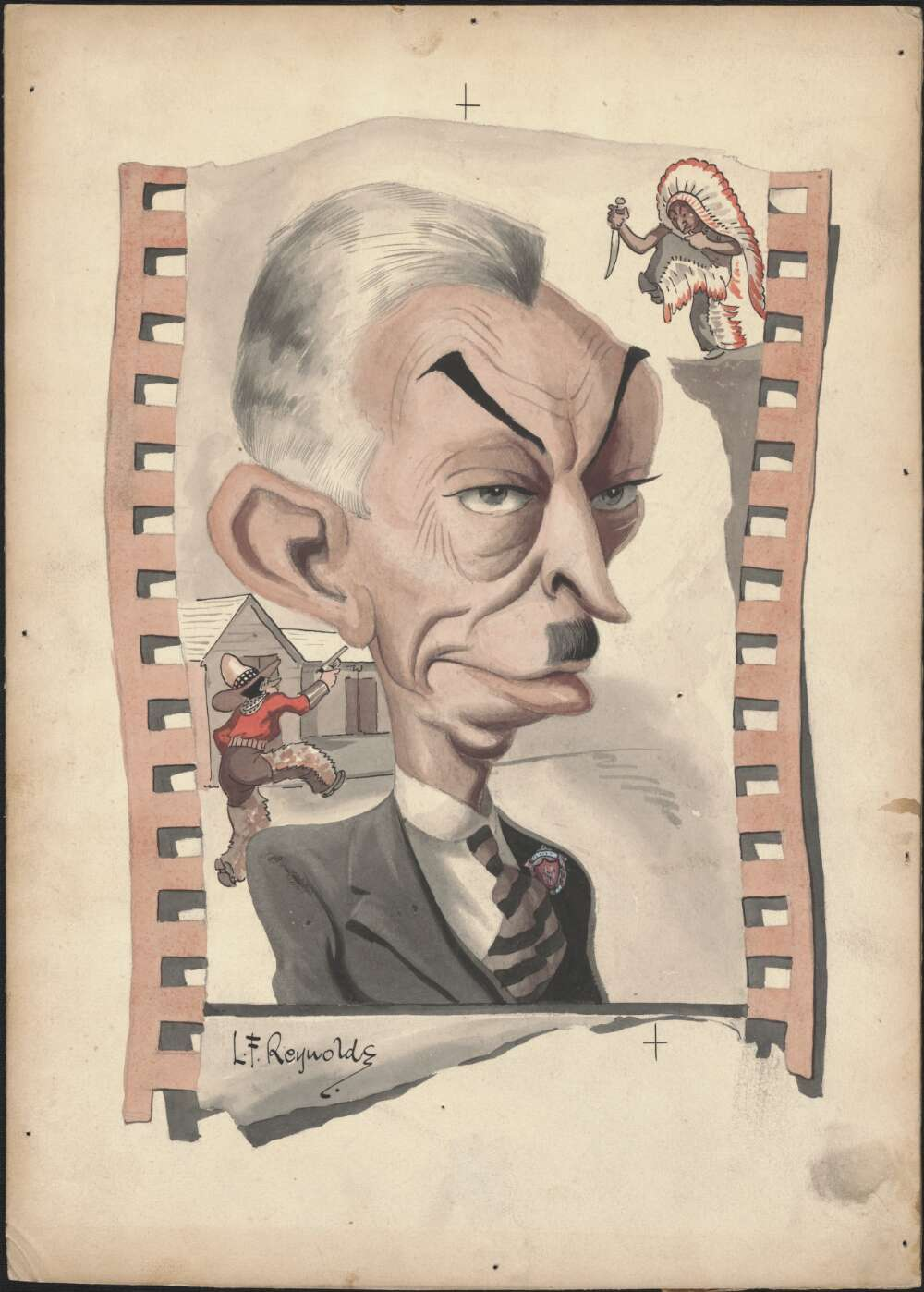
- Leonard Frank Reynolds, (1927) 'Portrait of William Alfred Gibson'
- Born: William Alfred Gibson; 31 August 1866; Deptford, Kent, UKGBI
- Died: 6 October 1929 (aged 63); Melbourne, Victoria, Australia
- Occupations: Film producer; film exhibitor; businessperson
- Organisation(s): Amalgamated Pictures; Australasian Films; Union Theatres
- Known for: Collaboration with Millard Johnson
- Spouse: Annabella Gibson (m. 1899)
- Children: 2

William Gibson OBE (1866–1929) was a British-born Australian film producer, film exhibitor and businessperson, known for his collaboration with Millard Johnson. Gibson was a founding member of Amalgamated Pictures and co-produced The Story of the Kelly Gang (1906), believed to be the first narrative feature film.

== Early life ==
William Alfred Gibson was born on 31 August 1866 in Deptford, Kent (present-day, London) to William Gibson and Matilda Gibson (née Day). Gibson was baptised on 14 October 1866 at St Paul's, Deptford.

Gibson was educated at Ilford College in Essex, and emigrated to Melbourne as a teenager.

== Career ==
In Melbourne, Gibson initially worked for William Johnson & Son as a chemist. Gibson's foray into the film industry began through his work with William Johnson's son, Millard Johnson. Together, they expanded their interests from chemical supply to film exhibition, quickly establishing themselves as key players in the burgeoning film industry in Australia. Their success in exhibition naturally led them to explore other areas of the industry, including film processing and photography.

=== The Story of the Kelly Gang ===
One of Gibson's most notable achievements was his involvement in the production of The Story of the Kelly Gang (1906), which is widely regarded as the world's first feature-length film. The film was a groundbreaking project that depicted the life of the infamous Australian outlaw Ned Kelly and his gang. Gibson and Millard Johnson played a crucial role in the production of this historic film, collaborating with the Tait brothers to bring the project to fruition. The success of The Story of the Kelly Gang marked a significant milestone in cinematic history and laid the foundation for future feature films.

=== Amalgamated Pictures and the Formation of Australasian Films ===
Following the success of The Story of the Kelly Gang, Gibson and Johnson, along with the Tait brothers, formed Amalgamated Pictures. This company was one of the earliest film production and distribution companies in Australia, playing a pivotal role in the development of the Australian film industry.

As the film industry grew, Amalgamated Pictures merged with several other companies to form Australasian Films and Union Theatres. This merger created the famous "Combine," a powerful entity that dominated the distribution and exhibition landscape in Australia during the 1920s. The Combine was instrumental in shaping the Australian film industry, ensuring that locally produced films reached a wide audience.

=== Australasian Films ===
Gibson served as the managing director of Australasian Films and Union Theatres, overseeing the company's operations during a period of significant growth and consolidation within the industry. Under his leadership, the Combine maintained a stronghold over Australian film distribution and exhibition, making it a central figure in the nation's cultural life.

== Legacy ==
William Gibson's contributions to the film industry, particularly in Australia, have left a lasting legacy. His pioneering work in film production and distribution helped establish the foundations of the Australian cinema, and his role in the creation of The Story of the Kelly Gang continues to be celebrated as a landmark achievement in the history of film.

On 19 October 1920, Gibson was awarded the Order of the British Empire for patriotic services.

== Personal life ==
In 1899, Gibson married Annabella Gibson (née Kirk). The couple had two children.

On 6 October 1929 Gibson died aged 63 in Melbourne. Gibson is buried at Brighton General Cemetery.
