= Millard Johnson (producer) =

Australian film producer (1860–1946)

Millard Johnson (1860–1946) was an Australian film producer and exhibitor best known for his collaboration with William Gibson. He met Gibson when the latter was working as a chemist for Johnson's father's firm. The two of them formed the firm Johnson and Gibson, which was involved in exhibition, photography, and film processing. He was probably the cinematographer of the early feature film The Story of the Kelly Gang (1906).

Johnson and Gibson later helped form Amalgamated Pictures. From 1913 until the 1920s, he worked in the USA as a film buyer for Australasian Films.
