= Convicts in Australia =

Transportation of convicts to Australia

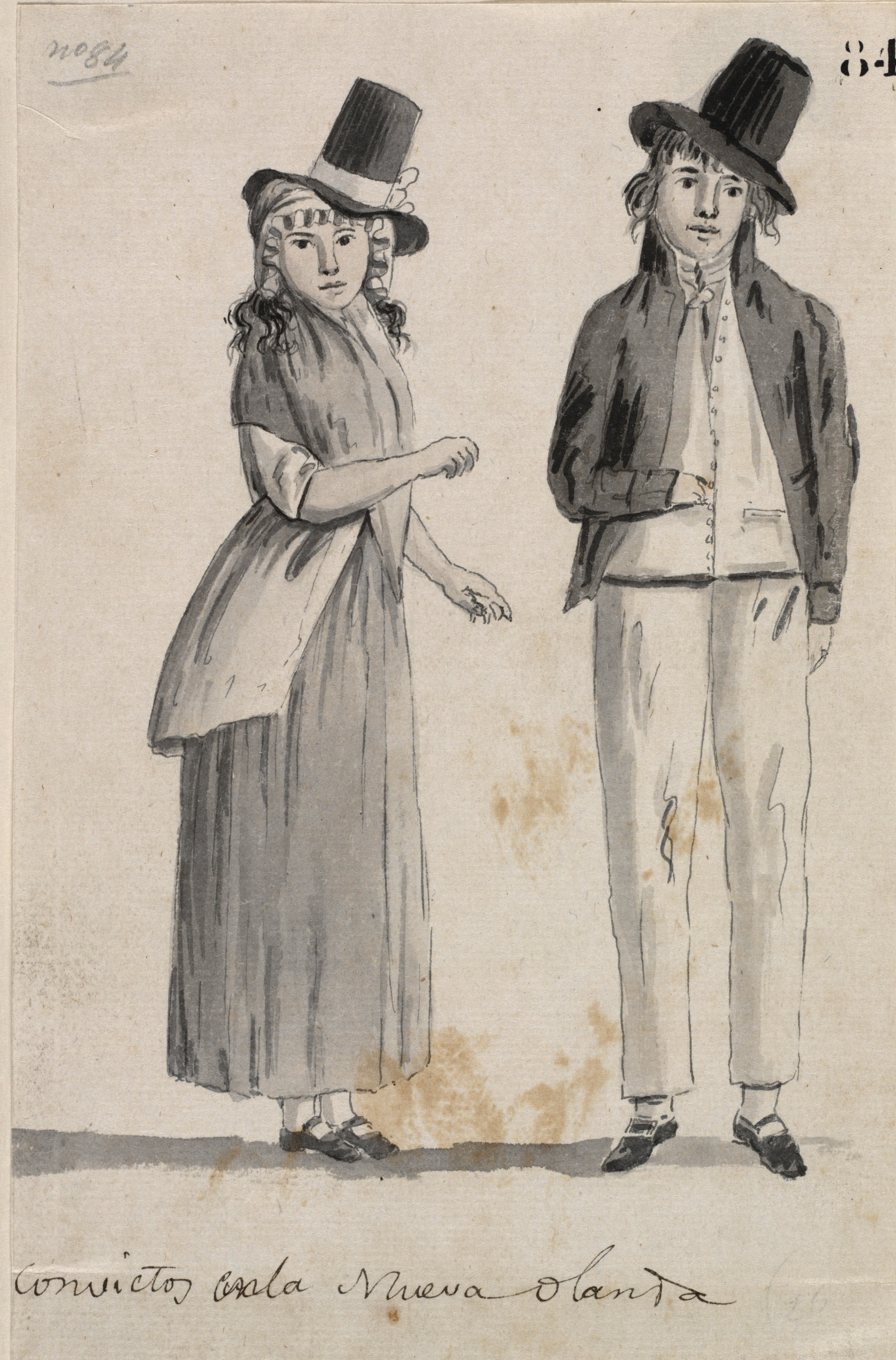
Convicts in Sydney, 1793, by Juan Ravenet

Between 1784 and 1868 the British penal system transported about 162,000 convicts from Great Britain and Ireland to various penal colonies in Australia.

The British Government began transporting convicts overseas to American colonies in the early 18th century. After trans-Atlantic transportation ended with the start of the American Revolution, authorities sought an alternative destination to relieve further overcrowding of British prisons and hulks. Earlier in 1770, James Cook had charted and claimed possession of the east coast of Australia for Great Britain. Seeking to prevent the French colonial empire from expanding into the region, Great Britain chose Australia as the site of a penal colony, and in 1787, the First Fleet of eleven convict ships set sail for Botany Bay, arriving on 20 January 1788 to found Sydney, New South Wales, the first European settlement on the continent. Other penal colonies were later established in Van Diemen's Land (Tasmania) in 1803 and Queensland in 1824. Western Australia – established as the Swan River Colony in 1829 – initially was intended solely for free settlers, but commenced receiving convicts in 1850. South Australia and Victoria, established in 1836 and 1850 respectively, officially remained free colonies. However, a population that included thousands of convicts already resided in the area that became known as Victoria.

Penal transportation to Australia peaked in the 1830s and dropped off significantly in the following decade, as protests against the convict system intensified throughout the colonies. In 1868, almost two decades after transportation to the eastern colonies had ceased, the last convict ship arrived in Western Australia.

Most convicts were transported for petty crimes, particularly theft: thieves comprised 80% of all transportees. More serious crimes, such as rape and murder, became transportable offences in the 1830s, but since they were also punishable by death, comparatively few convicts were transported for such crimes. Approximately one in seven convicts was female. Political prisoners who had been convicted of no crime were also transported. Once emancipated, most ex-convicts stayed in Australia and joined the free settlers, with some rising to prominent positions in Australian society. However, convictism carried a social stigma and, for some later Australians, being of convict descent instilled a sense of shame and cultural cringe. Attitudes became more accepting in the 20th century, and it is now considered by many Australians to be a cause for celebration to discover a convict in one's lineage. In 2007, it was estimated that approximately four million Australians were related to convicts that were transported from the British Isles to Australia. The convict era has inspired famous novels, films, and other cultural works, and the extent to which it has shaped Australia's national character has been studied by many writers and historians.

== Reasons for transportation ==
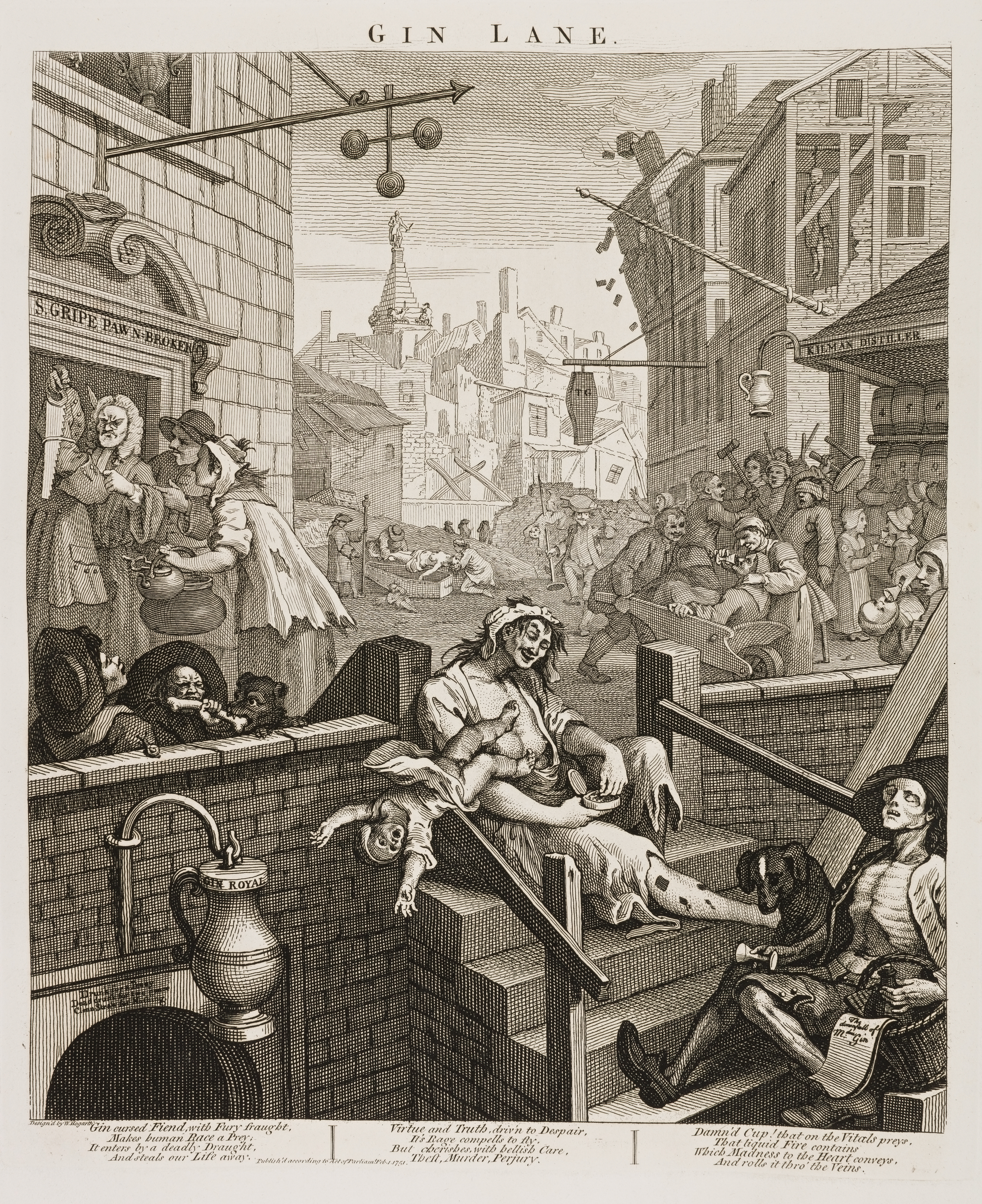
William Hogarth's Gin Lane, 1751.

According to Robert Hughes in The Fatal Shore, the population of England and Wales, which had remained steady at 6 million from 1700 to 1740, began rising considerably after 1740. By the time of the American Revolution, London was overcrowded, filled with the unemployed, and flooded with cheap gin. Poverty, social injustice, child labour, harsh and dirty living conditions and long working hours were prevalent in 19th-century Britain. Dickens's novels perhaps best illustrate this; many government officials were horrified by what they saw. Only in 1833 and 1844 were the first general laws against child labour (the Factory Acts) passed in the United Kingdom. Crime had become a major problem. In 1784, a French observer noted that "from sunset to dawn the environs of London became the patrimony of brigands for twenty miles around."

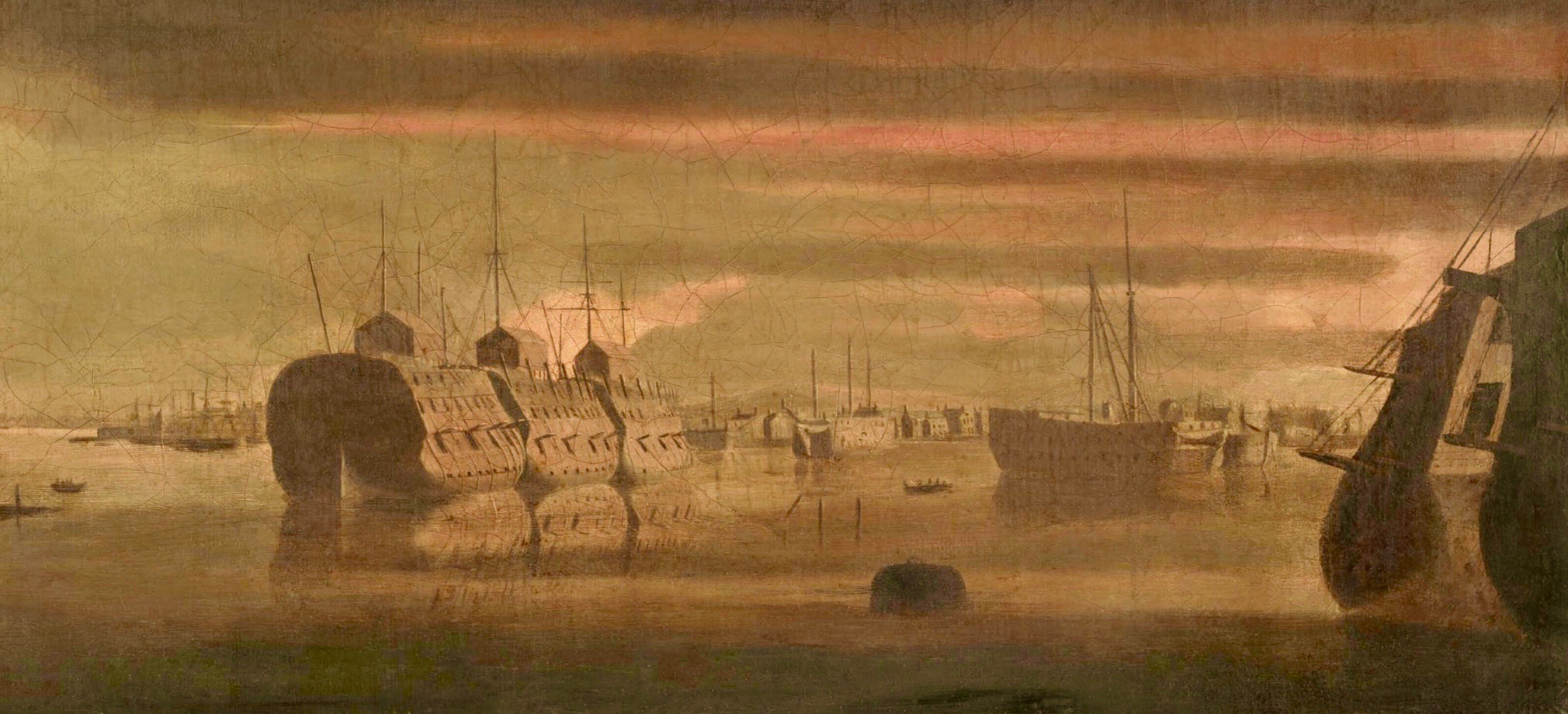
Prison hulks in the River Thames, England, 1814

All parishes had watchmen and constables, but British cities did not have police forces in the modern sense. Jeremy Bentham strongly promoted the idea of a circular prison, but the penitentiary was seen by many government officials as a peculiar American concept. Virtually all malefactors were caught by informers or denounced to the local court by their victims. Pursuant to the so-called "Bloody Code", by the 1770s some 222 crimes in Britain carried the death penalty. Almost all of these were crimes against property, including such offences as the stealing of goods worth over 5 shillings, the cutting down of a tree, the theft of an animal, even the theft of a rabbit from a warren.

Because the Industrial Revolution economically displaced much of the working class, there was an increase in petty crime. The government was under pressure to find an alternative to confinement in overcrowded gaols. The situation was so dire that hulks left over from the Seven Years' War were used as makeshift floating prisons. Four out of five prisoners were in jail for theft.

In the 1800s the Bloody Code was gradually rescinded because judges and juries considered its punishments too harsh. Since lawmakers still wanted punishments to deter potential criminals, they increasingly used transportation as a more humane sentence to execution. Transportation had been employed as a punishment for both major and petty crimes since the 17th century.

About 60,000 convicts were transported to the British colonies in North America in the seventeenth and eighteenth centuries, under the terms of the Transportation Act 1717. Transportation to the Americas ceased following Britain's defeat in the American Revolutionary War. The number of convicts transported to North America is not verified, although it has been estimated to be 50,000 by John Dunmore Lang and 120,000 by Thomas Keneally. The British American colony of Maryland received a larger felon quota than any other province.

== Penal settlements ==
=== New South Wales ===
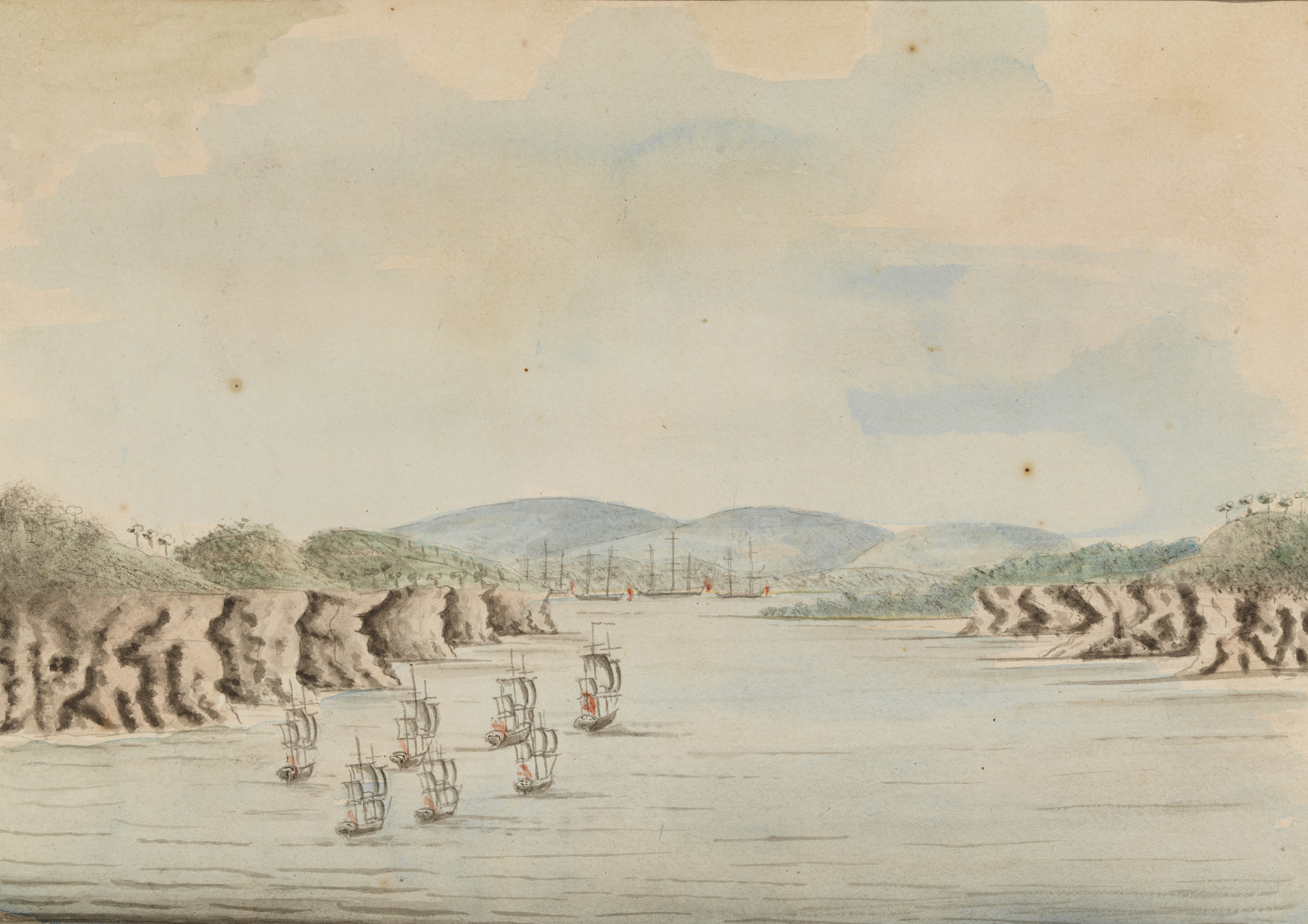
The First Fleet arrives in Botany Bay, 21 January 1788, by William Bradley (1802).

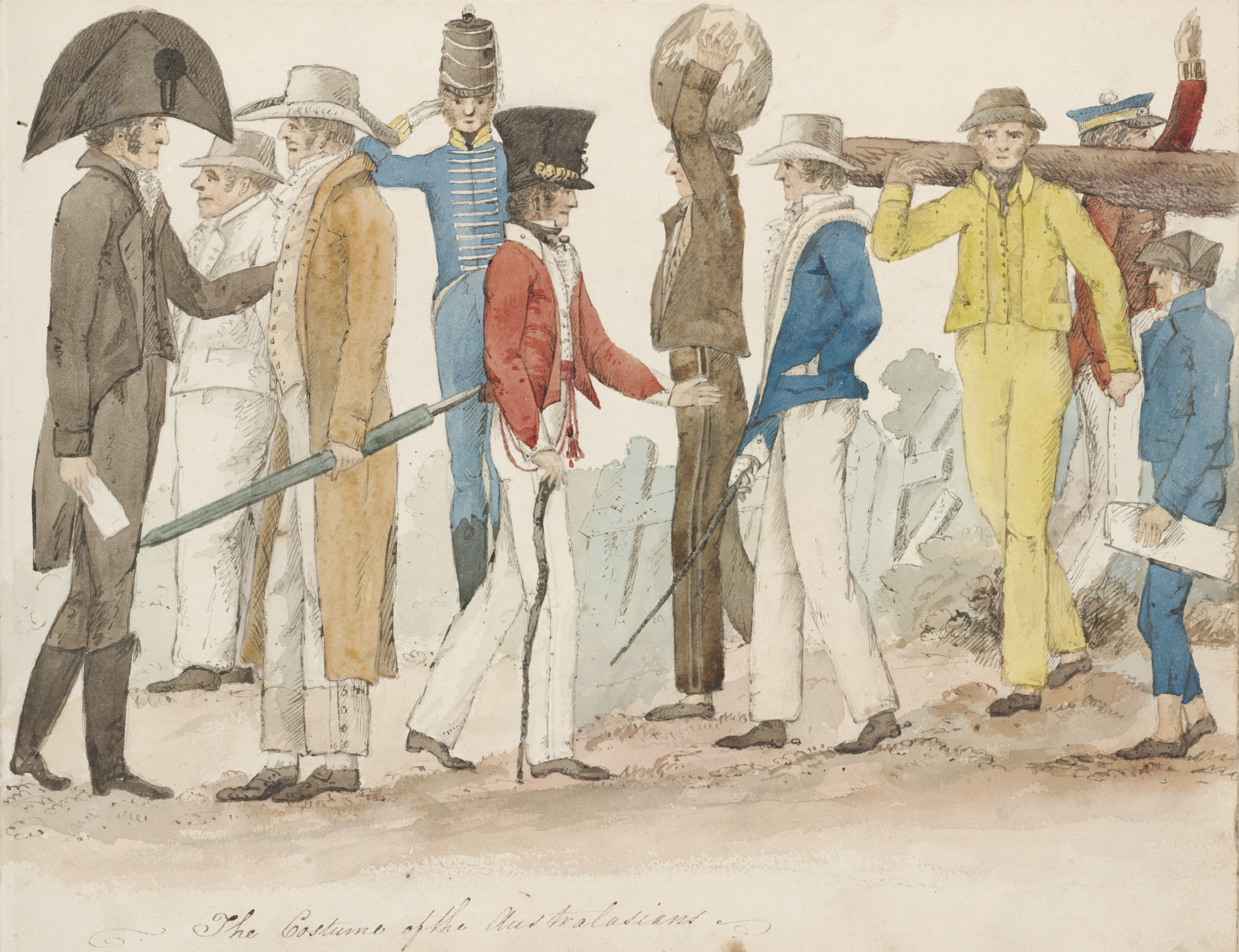
The Costume of the Australasians by Edward Charles Close shows the co-existence of convicts, soldiers and free settlers.

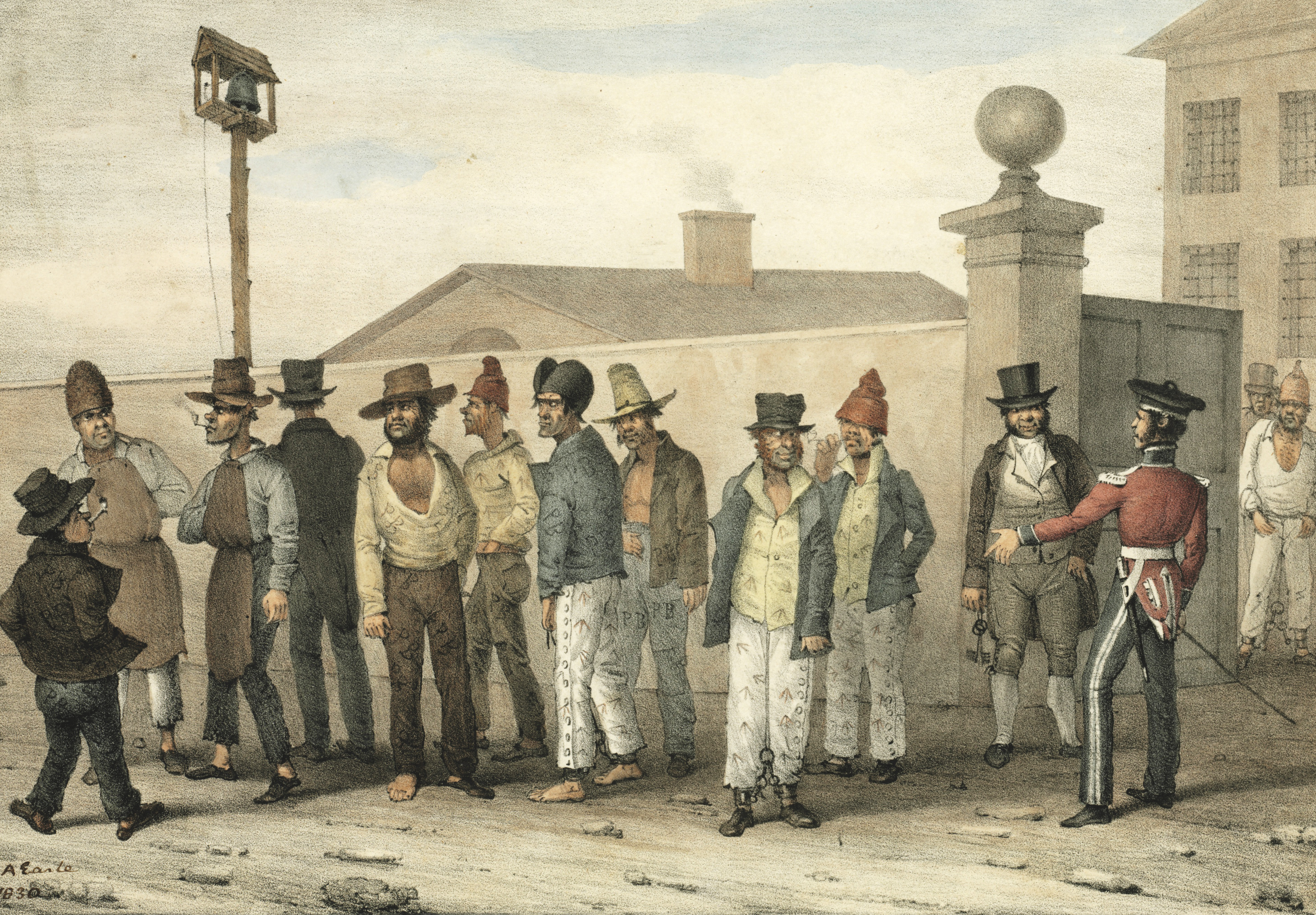
Views in New South Wales and Van Diemens Land, by Earle Augustus (1830)

Alternatives to the American colonies were investigated and the newly discovered and mapped East Coast of New Holland was proposed. The details provided by James Cook during his expedition to the South Pacific in 1770 made it the most suitable.

On 18 August 1786, the decision was made to send a colonisation party of convicts, military, and civilian personnel to Botany Bay under the command of Captain Arthur Phillip, who was appointed as Governor of the new colony. There were 775 convicts on board six transport ships. They were accompanied by officials, members of the crew, marines, the families thereof, and their own children who together totaled 645. In all, eleven ships were sent in what became known as the First Fleet. Other than the convict transports, there were two naval escorts and three storeships. The fleet assembled in Portsmouth and set sail on 13 May 1787.

The eleven ships arrived at Botany Bay over the three-day period of 18–20 January 1788. It soon became clear that the bay would not be suitable for the establishment of a colony due to "the openness of this bay, and the dampness of the soil, by which the people would probably be rendered unhealthy". Phillip decided to examine Port Jackson, a bay mentioned by Captain Cook, about three leagues to the north. On 22 January 1788 a small expedition led by Phillips sailed to Port Jackson, arriving in the early afternoon:

Here all regret arising from the former disappointments was at once obliterated; and Governor Phillip had the satisfaction to find one of the finest harbours in the world, in which a thousand sail of the line might ride in perfect security. The different coves of this harbour were examined with all possible expedition, and the preference was given to one which had the finest spring of water, and in which ships can anchor so close to the shore, that at a very small expense quays may be constructed at which the largest vessels may unload. This cove is about half a mile in length and a quarter of a mile across at the entrance. In honour of Lord Sydney, the Governor distinguished it by the name of Sydney Cove.

There they established the first permanent European colony on the Australian continent, within New South Wales, on 26 January 1788. The area has since developed as the city of Sydney. This date is celebrated as Australia Day.

Initially the members of the first fleet suffered a high mortality rate, due mainly to starvation from shortages of food. The ships carried only enough food to provide for the settlers until they could establish agriculture in the region. There were an insufficient number of skilled farmers and domesticated livestock to achieve this. The colony had to await the arrival of the Second Fleet. The "Memorandoms" by James Martin provide a contemporary account of the events as seen by a convict from the first fleet. The second fleet was a disaster and provided little in the way of help. In June 1790 it delivered additional sick and dying convicts, affected by the rigors of the lengthy journey. The situation worsened in Port Jackson.

Lieutenant-General Sir Richard Bourke was the ninth Governor of the Colony of New South Wales, serving between 1831 and 1837. Appalled by the excessive punishments doled out to convicts during their imprisonment and work assignments, Bourke passed 'The Magistrates Act', which limited the sentence a magistrate could pass to fifty lashes (previously there was no such limit). Bourke's administration was controversial. Furious magistrates and employers petitioned the crown against this interference with their legal rights, fearing that a reduction in punishments would cease to provide enough deterrence to the convicts.

Bourke, however, was not dissuaded from his reforms. He continued to combat the inhumane treatment of convicts, and limited the number of convicts assigned to each employer to seventy. There was limited oversight of treatment of assigned convicts. Bourke granted rights to convicts who were freed after serving their sentences, such as allowing them to acquire property and serve on juries. It has been argued that the suspension of convict transportation to New South Wales in 1840 can be attributed to the actions of Bourke and other like-minded men, such as Australian-born lawyer William Charles Wentworth. It took another 10 years, but transportation to the colony of New South Wales was finally officially abolished on 1 October 1850.

If a convict was well behaved, the convict could be given a ticket of leave, granting some freedom. At the end of a convict's sentence, seven years in most cases, the convict was issued with a Certificate of Freedom. He was free to become a settler or to return to England. Convicts who misbehaved, however, were often sent to a place of secondary punishment, such as Port Arthur, Tasmania, or Norfolk Island, where they would suffer additional punishment and solitary confinement.

=== Norfolk Island ===
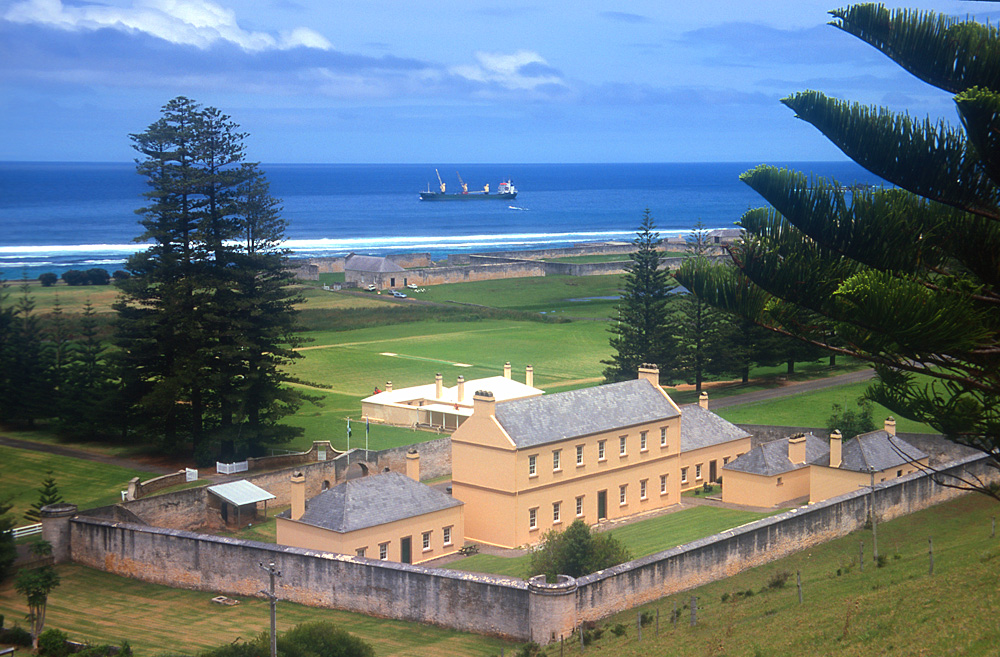
Norfolk Island military barracks.

Within a month of the arrival of the First Fleet at Sydney Cove, a group of convicts and free settlers were sent to take control of Norfolk Island, a small island 1,412 kilometres (877 mi) east of the coast of New South Wales. More convicts were sent, and many of them proved to be unruly. In early 1789 they made a failed attempt to overthrow Lieutenant Philip Gidley King, the island's commandant. There were other hazards: HMS Sirius was wrecked on one of the island's reefs while attempting to land stores.

=== Van Diemen's Land (Tasmania) ===
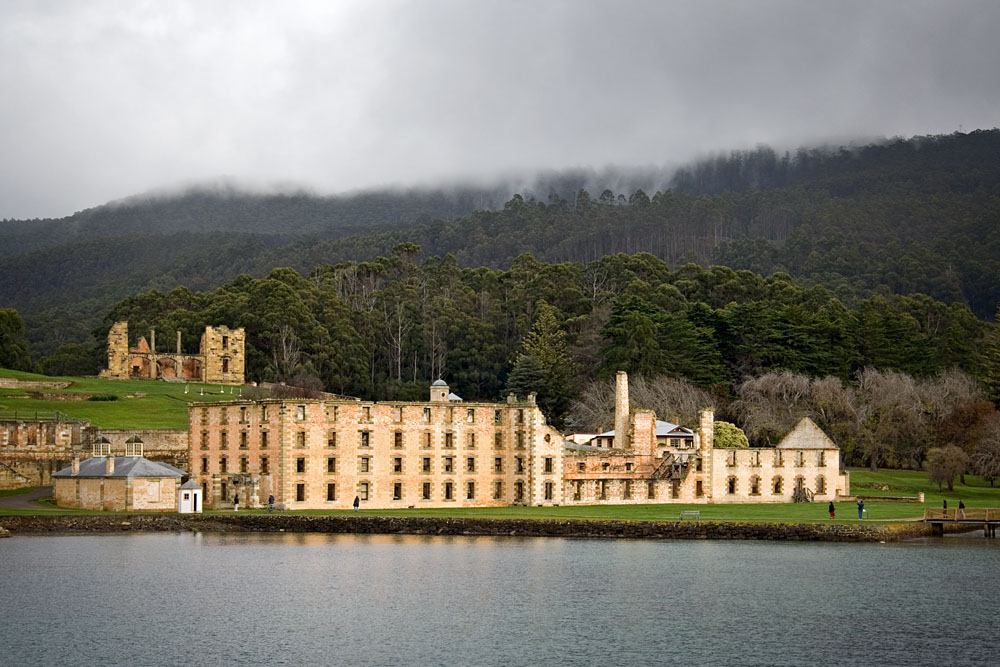
Penitentiary at the Port Arthur convict settlement, Tasmania

In 1803, a British expedition was sent from Sydney to Tasmania (then known as Van Diemen's Land) to establish a new penal colony there. The small party, led by Lt. John Bowen, established a settlement at Risdon Cove, on the eastern side of the Derwent River. Originally sent to Port Phillip, but abandoned within weeks, another expedition led by Lieutenant-Colonel David Collins arrived soon after.

Collins considered the Risdon Cove site inadequate, and in 1804 he established an alternative settlement on the western side of the river at Sullivan's Cove, Tasmania. This later became known as Hobart, and the original settlement at Risdon Cove was abandoned. Collins was appointed as the first Lieutenant-Governor of Van Diemen's Land.

When the convict station on Norfolk Island was abandoned in 1807–1808, the remaining convicts and free settlers were transported to Hobart and allocated land for resettlement. However, as the existing small population was already having difficulties producing enough food, the sudden doubling of the population was almost catastrophic.

Starting in 1816, more free settlers began arriving from Great Britain. On 3 December 1825 Tasmania was declared a colony separate from New South Wales, with a separate administration.

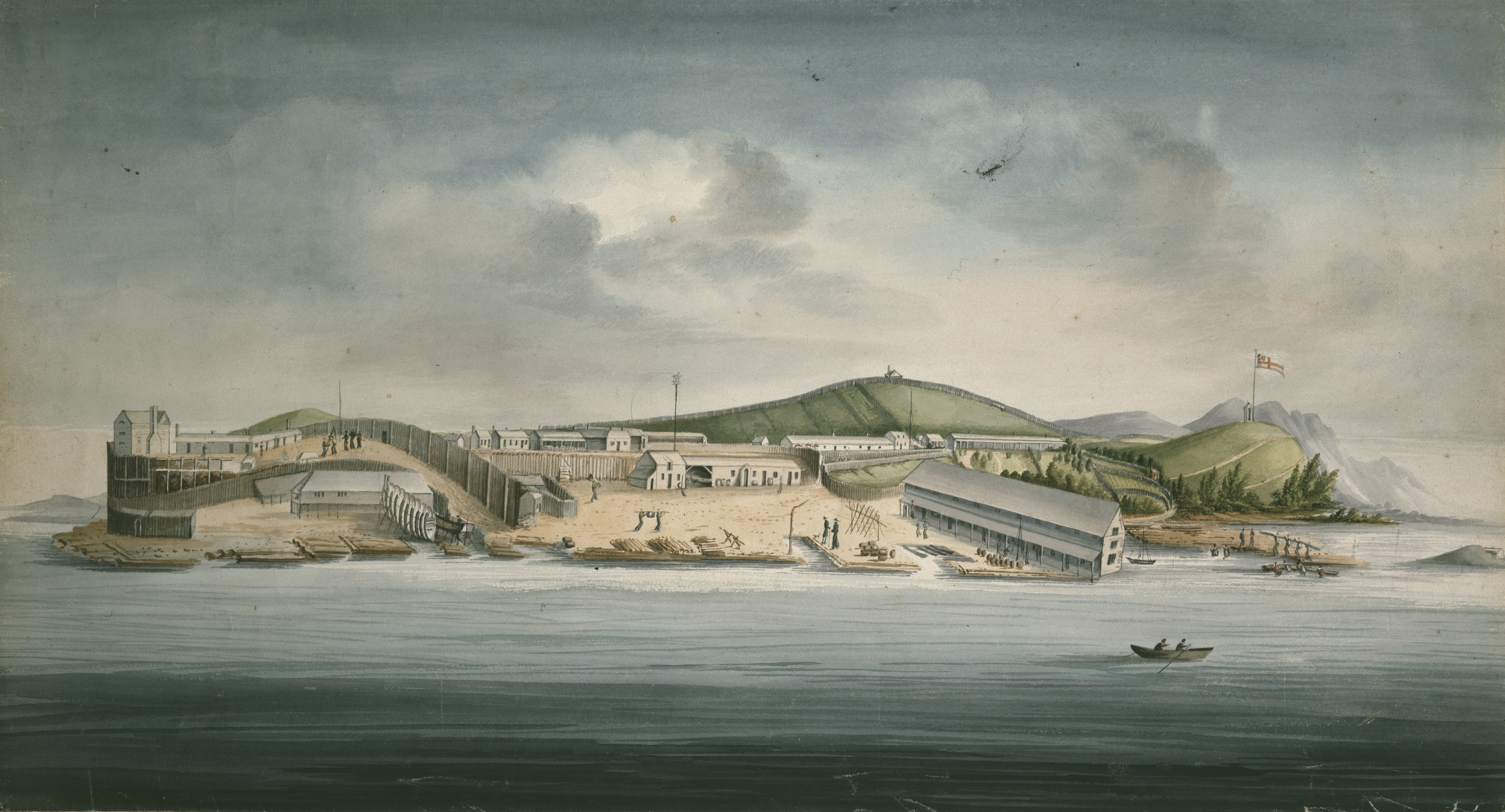
Macquarie Harbour Penal Station, depicted by convict artist William Buelow Gould, 1833

The Macquarie Harbour penal colony on the West Coast of Tasmania was established in 1820 to exploit the valuable timber Huon pine growing there for furniture making and shipbuilding. Macquarie Harbour had the added advantage of being almost impossible to escape from. Most attempts ended with fugitive convicts either drowning, dying of starvation in the bush, or (on at least three occasions) turning cannibal.

Convicts sent to this settlement had usually re-offended during their sentence of transportation. They were treated very harshly, labouring in cold and wet weather, and subjected to severe corporal punishment for minor infractions. Several hundred non-indigenous black convicts were transported to Van Diemen's Land, some as punishment for speaking or acting against the British Empire. Most of these black convicts had been enslaved, and were transported for resisting their enslavement.

In 1830, the Port Arthur penal settlement was established to replace Macquarie Harbour, as it was easier to maintain regular communications by sea. Although known in popular history as a particularly harsh prison, in reality, its management was far more humane than Macquarie Harbour or the outlying stations of New South Wales. Experimentation with the so-called model prison system took place in Port Arthur. Solitary confinement was the preferred method of punishment.

Many changes were made to the manner in which convicts were handled in the general population, largely responsive to British public opinion on the harshness of their treatment. Until the late 1830s, most convicts were either retained by the Government for public works or assigned to private individuals as a form of indentured labour. From the early 1840s the Probation System was employed, where convicts spent an initial period, usually two years, in public works gangs on stations outside of the main settlements. They were then freed to work for wages within a set district.

Transportation to Tasmania ended in 1853 (see section below on Cessation of Transportation). Records on the individual convicts transported to Van Diemen's Land or born there between 1803 and 1900 were being digitised as of 2019 as part of the Founders and Survivors project.

=== Port Phillip District (Victoria) ===
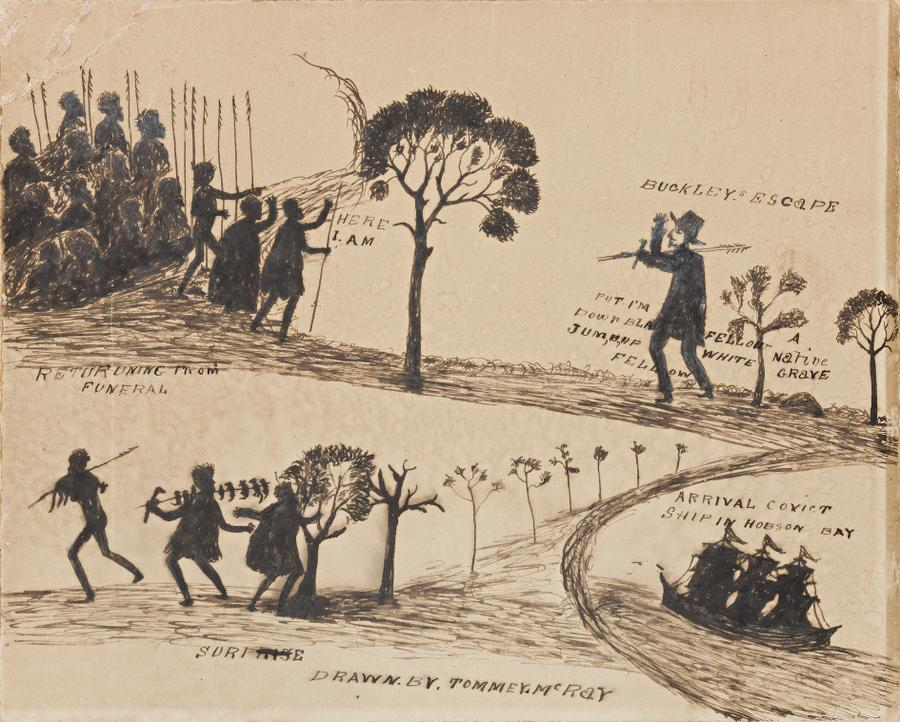
William Buckley's transportation and escape to live with the Wathaurong in 1803, as depicted by 19th-century Aboriginal artist Tommy McRae

In 1803, two ships arrived in Port Phillip, which Lt. John Murray in the Lady Nelson had discovered and named the previous year. The Calcutta under the command of Lieutenant-Colonel Collins transported 300 convicts, accompanied by the supply ship Ocean. Collins had previously been Judge Advocate with the First Fleet in 1788. He chose Sullivan Bay near the present-day Sorrento, Victoria for the first settlement - some 90 km south of present-day Melbourne. About two months later the settlement was abandoned due to poor soil and water shortages and Collins moved the convicts to Hobart. Several convicts had escaped into the bush and were left behind to unknown fates with the local aboriginal people. One such convict, the subsequently celebrated William Buckley, lived in the western side of Port Phillip for the next 32 years before approaching the new settlers and assisting as an interpreter for the indigenous peoples.

A second settlement was established at Westernport Bay, on the site of present-day Corinella, in November 1826. It comprised an initial 20 soldiers and 22 convicts, with another 12 convicts arriving subsequently. This settlement was abandoned in February 1828, and all convicts returned to Sydney.

The Port Phillip District was officially sanctioned in 1837 following the landing of the Henty brothers in Portland Bay in 1834, and John Batman settled on the site of Melbourne.

Between 1844 and 1849 about 1,750 convicts arrived there from England. They were referred to either as "Exiles" or the "Pentonvillians" because most of them came from Pentonville Probationary Prison. Unlike earlier convicts who were required to work for the government or on hire from penal depots, the Exiles were free to work for pay, but could not leave the district to which they were assigned. The Port Phillip District was still part of New South Wales at this stage. Victoria separated from New South Wales and became an independent colony in 1851.

=== Moreton Bay (Queensland) ===
In 1823 John Oxley sailed north from Sydney to inspect Port Curtis and Moreton Bay as possible sites for a penal colony. At Moreton Bay, he found the Brisbane River, which Cook had guessed would exist, and explored the lower part of it. In September 1824, he returned with soldiers and established a temporary settlement at Redcliffe. On 2 December 1824, the settlement was transferred to where the Central Business District (CBD) of Brisbane now stands. The settlement was at first called Edenglassie. In 1839 transportation of convicts to Moreton Bay ceased and the Brisbane penal settlement was closed. In 1842 free settlement was permitted and people began to colonize the area voluntarily. On 6 June 1859 Queensland became a colony separate from New South Wales. In 2009 the Convict Records of Queensland, held by the Queensland State Archives and the State Library of Queensland was added to UNESCO's Australian Memory of the World Register.

=== Western Australia ===
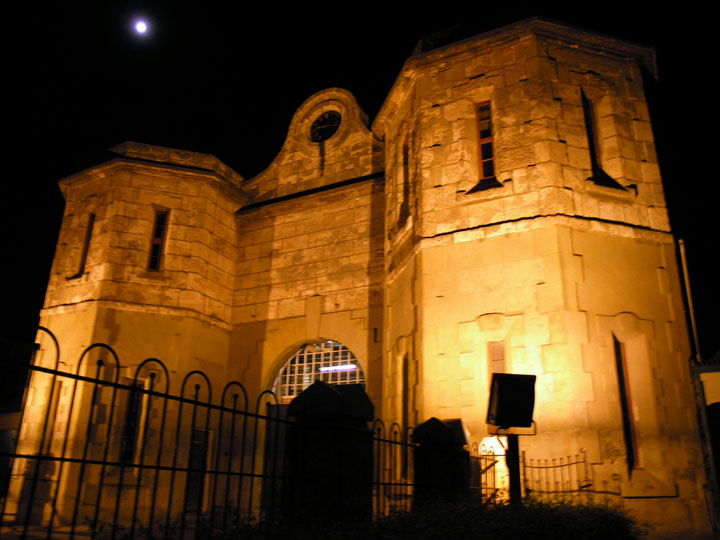
Fremantle Prison gatehouse. The prison was built using convict labour in the 1850s.

Although a convict-supported settlement was established in Western Australia from 1826 to 1831, direct transportation of convicts did not begin until 1850. It continued until 1868. During that period, 9,668 convicts were transported on 43 convict ships. The first convicts to arrive were transported to New South Wales, and sent by that colony to King George Sound (Albany) in 1826 to help establish a settlement there. At that time the western third of Australia was unclaimed land known as New Holland. Fears that France would lay claim to the land prompted the Governor of New South Wales, Ralph Darling, to send Major Edmund Lockyer, with troops and 23 convicts, to establish a settlement at King George Sound. Lockyer's party arrived on Christmas Day, 1826. A convict presence was maintained at the settlement for over four years. On 7 March 1831 control of the settlement was transferred to the Swan River Colony, and the troops and convicts were withdrawn.

In April 1848, Charles Fitzgerald, Governor of Western Australia, petitioned Britain to send convicts to his state because of labour shortages. Britain rejected sending fixed-term convicts, but offered to send first offenders in the final years of their terms.

Most convicts in Western Australia spent very little time in prison. Those who were stationed at Fremantle were housed in the Convict Establishment, the colony's convict prison, and misbehaviour was punished by stints there. The majority, however, were stationed in other parts of the colony. Although there was no convict assignment in Western Australia, there was a great demand for public infrastructure throughout the colony, so that many convicts were stationed in remote areas. Initially, most offenders were set to work creating infrastructure for the convict system, including the construction of the Convict Establishment itself.

In 1852 a Convict Depot was built at Albany, but closed 3 years later. When shipping increased the Depot was re-opened. Most of the convicts had their Ticket-of-Leave and were hired to work by the free settlers. Convicts also crewed the pilot boat, rebuilt York Street and Stirling Terrace; and the track from Albany to Perth was made into a good road. An Albany newspaper noted their commendable behaviour and wrote, "There were instances in which our free settlers might take an example".

Western Australia's convict era came to an end with the cessation of penal transportation by Britain. In May 1865, the colony was advised of the change in British policy, and told that Britain would send one convict ship in each of the years 1865, 1866, and 1867, after which transportation would cease. In accordance with this, the last convict ship to Western Australia, Hougoumont, left Britain in 1867 and arrived in Western Australia on 10 January 1868.

== Women ==
Between 1788 and 1852, about 24,000 transportees (one in seven) were women. Some 80% of women had been convicted of theft, usually petty. For protection, many quickly attached themselves to male officers or convicts. Although they were routinely referred to as courtesans, no women were transported for prostitution, as it was not a transportable offence.

== Political prisoners ==
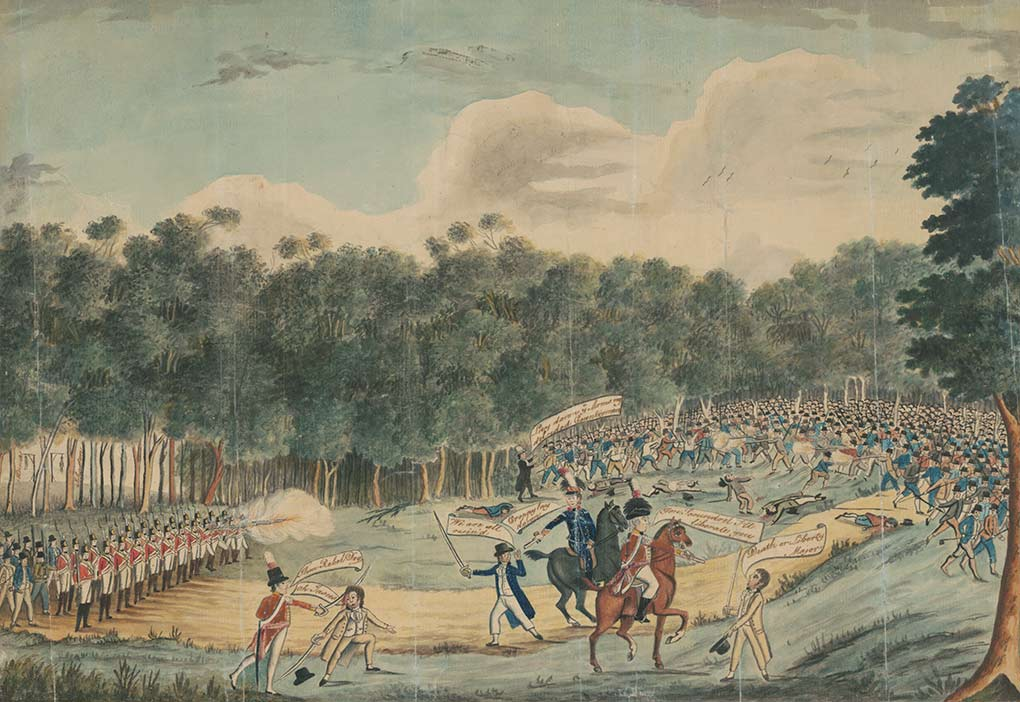
Painting of the 1804 Castle Hill convict rebellion

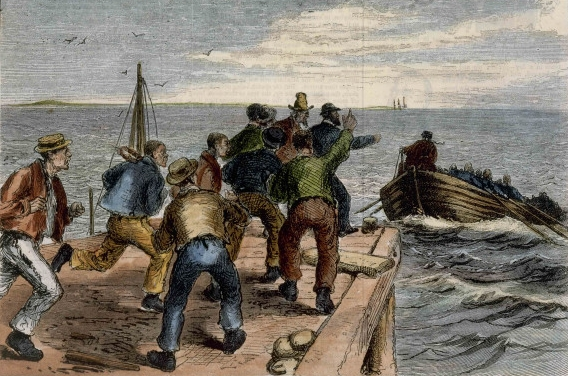
Fenian convicts escape from Fremantle in the 1876 Catalpa rescue.

Approximately 3,600 political prisoners were transported to the Australian colonies, many of whom arrived in waves corresponding to political unrest in Britain and Ireland. They included the First Scottish Martyrs in 1794; British Naval Mutineers (from the Nore Mutiny) in 1797 and 1801; Irish rebels in 1798, 1803, 1848 and 1868; Cato Street Conspirators (1820); Scots Rebels (1820); Yorkshire Rebels (1820 and 1822); leaders of the Merthyr Tydfil rising of 1831; the Tolpuddle Martyrs (1834); Swing Rioters and Luddites (1828–1833); American and French-Canadian prisoners from the Upper Canada rebellion and Lower Canada Rebellion (1839); and Chartists (1842).

== Cessation of transportation ==
With increasing numbers of free settlers entering New South Wales and Van Diemen's Land (Tasmania) by the mid-1830s, opposition to the transportation of felons into the colonies grew. The most influential spokesmen were newspaper proprietors who were also members of the Independent Congregational Church such as John Fairfax in Sydney and the Reverend John West in Launceston, who argued against convicts both as competition to honest free labourers and as the source of crime and vice within the colony. Bishop Bernard Ullathorne, a Catholic prelate who had been in Australia since 1832 returned for a visit to England in 1835. While there he was called upon by the government to give evidence before a Parliamentary Commission on the evils of transportation, and at their request wrote and submitted a tract on the subject. His views in conjunction with others in the end prevailed. The anti-transportation movement was seldom concerned with the inhumanity of the system, but rather the "hated stain" it was believed to inflict on the free (non-emancipist) middle classes.

In 1837, a parliamentary committee headed by Sir William Molesworth recommended ending transportation to New South Wales. Transportation to New South Wales was temporarily ended in 1840 under the Order-in-Council of 22 May 1840, by which time some 150,000 convicts had been sent to the colonies. The sending of convicts to Brisbane in its Moreton Bay district had ceased the previous year, and administration of Norfolk Island was later transferred to Van Diemen's Land. In 1848, an attempt to reintroduce transportation to New South Wales in limited form met intense local opposition and was never implemented.

Opposition to transportation was not unanimous; wealthy landowner, Benjamin Boyd, for reasons of economic self-interest, wanted to use transported convicts from Van Diemen's Land as a source of free or low-cost labour in New South Wales, particularly as shepherds. The final transport of convicts to New South Wales occurred in 1850, with some 1,400 convicts transported between the Order-in-Council and that date.

The continuation of transportation to Van Diemen's Land saw the rise of a well-coordinated anti-transportation movement, especially following a severe economic depression in the early 1840s. Transportation was temporarily suspended in 1846 but soon revived with overcrowding of British gaols and clamour for the availability of transportation as a deterrent. By the late 1840s most convicts being sent to Van Diemen's Land (plus those to Victoria) were designated as "exiles" and were free to work for pay while under sentence. In 1850 the Australasian Anti-Transportation League was formed to lobby for the permanent cessation of transportation, its aims being furthered by the commencement of the Australian gold rushes the following year. The last convict ship to be sent from England, the St. Vincent, arrived in 1853, and on 10 August Jubilee festivals in Hobart and Launceston celebrated 50 years of European settlement with the official end of transportation.

Transportation to Western Australia began in 1850 and continued in small numbers until the end of transportation to Australia in total. The last convict ship, Hougoumont, left Britain in 1867 and arrived in Western Australia on 10 January 1868. In all, about 164,000 convicts were transported to the Australian colonies between 1788 and 1868 onboard 806 ships. Convicts were made up of English and Welsh (70%), Irish (24%), Scottish (5%), and the remaining 1% from the British outposts in India and Canada, Māori from New Zealand, Chinese from Hong Kong, and slaves from the Caribbean.

Samuel Speed, who died 150 years after the arrival of the First Fleet and 70 years after the arrival of the last convict ship, is believed to have been the last surviving transported convict. Born in Birmingham in 1841, he was tried in Oxfordshire for setting fire to a haystack in 1863. Homeless, he had set the fire as a deliberate ploy to be arrested and obtain shelter in a cell. Speed was transported to Western Australia in 1866, arriving in Fremantle aboard the Belgravia on 3 July. He was conditionally released in 1869 and was granted his certificate of freedom two years later. He initially found work as a general servant before working in bridge construction, proceeding to work for various companies around Western Australia. Speed lived a law-abiding life, never being convicted of any further crimes. He retired to an old men's home in Perth where he died in 1938.

== Legacy ==
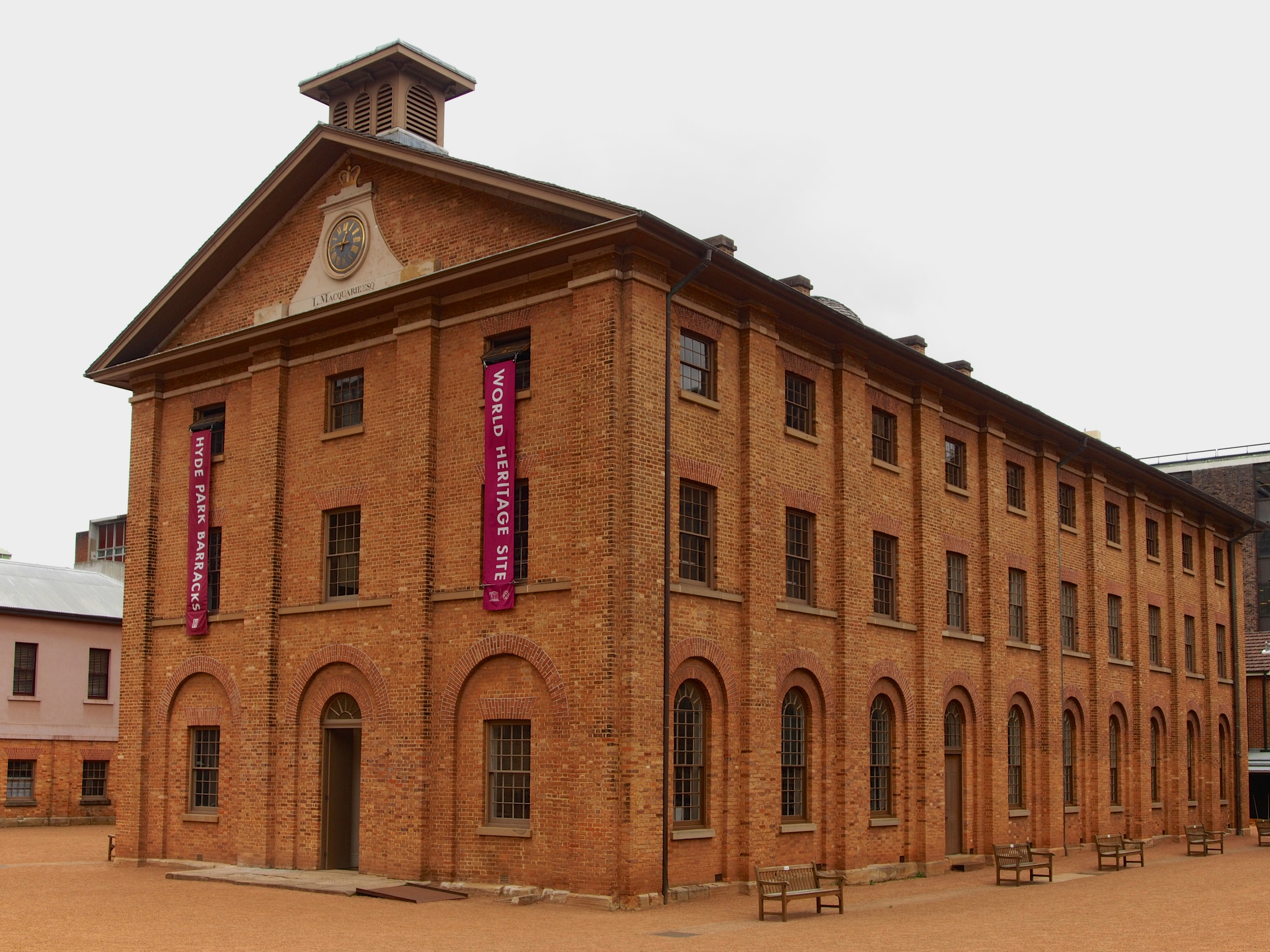
Hyde Park Barracks, designed by convict Francis Greenway and constructed by convicts in the 1810s, is one of eleven World Heritage-listed Australian Convict Sites.

In 2010, UNESCO inscribed 11 Australian Convict Sites on its World Heritage List. The listing recognises the sites as "the best surviving examples of large-scale convict transportation and the colonial expansion of European powers through the presence and labour of convicts."

=== Cultural depictions ===
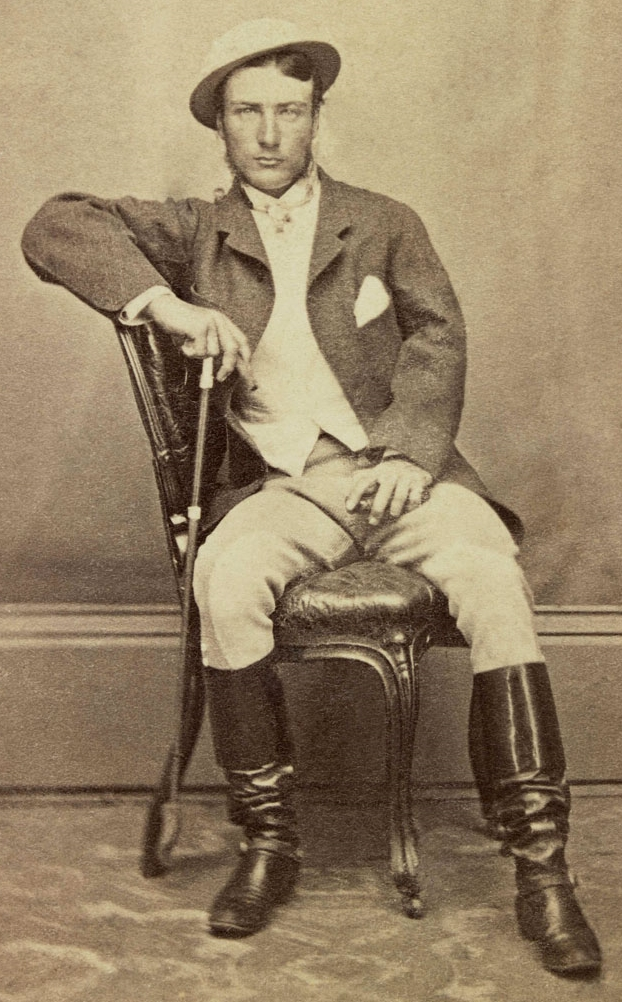
Marcus Clarke (c. 1866), author of For the Term of His Natural Life, Australia's most famous convict novel

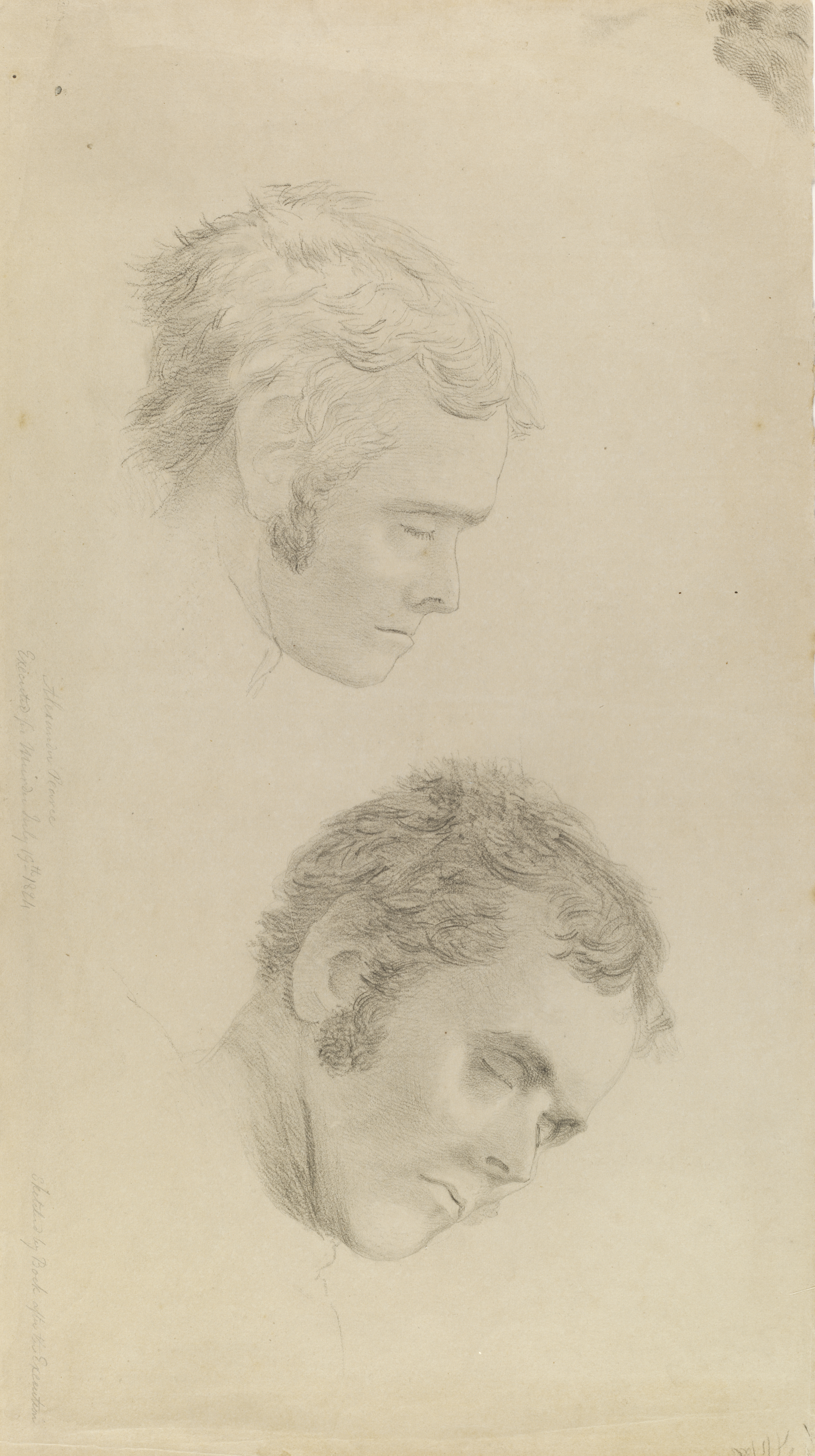
Convict Alexander Pearce has inspired three feature films (drawings by convict Thomas Bock, 1824).

Convict George Barrington is (perhaps apocryphally) recorded as having written the prologue for the first theatrical play performed by convicts in Australia, one year after the First Fleet's arrival. It is known as "Our Country's Good", based on the now-famous closing stanza:

From distant climes, o'er wides-pread seas, we come,
Though not with much éclat or beat of drum,
True patriots all: for, be it understood:
We left our country for our country's good.

The poems of Frank the Poet are among the few surviving literary works done by a convict while still incarcerated. His best-known work is "A Convict's Tour of Hell". A version of the convict ballad "Moreton Bay", detailing the brutal punishments meted out by commandant Patrick Logan and his death at the hands of Aborigines, is also attributed to Frank. Other convict ballads include "Jim Jones at Botany Bay". The ballad "Botany Bay", which describes the sadness felt by convicts forced to leave their loved ones in England, was written at least 40 years after the end of transportation.

Perhaps the most famous convict in all of fiction is Abel Magwitch, a main character of Charles Dickens' 1861 novel Great Expectations. The most famous convict novel is Marcus Clarke's For the Term of His Natural Life (1874), followed by John Boyle O'Reilly's Moondyne (1879). The Broad Arrow by Caroline Woolmer Leakey was one of the first novels to depict the convict experience, and one of the only to feature a female convict as its protagonist (Marcus Clarke drew on Leakey's book in writing For the Term of His Natural Life). Thomas Keneally explores the convict era in his novels Bring Larks and Heroes (1967) and The Playmaker (1987). Convicts feature heavily in Patrick White's take on the Eliza Fraser story, the 1976 novel A Fringe of Leaves. Convictism is canvassed in Bryce Courtenay's "Australian trilogy": The Potato Factory (1995), Tommo & Hawk (1997) and Solomon's Song (1999). The title character of Peter Carey's 1997 novel Jack Maggs is a reworking of Dickens' Magwitch character. Many modern works of Tasmanian Gothic focus on the state's convict past, including Gould's Book of Fish (2001) by Richard Flanagan, a fictionalised account of convict artist William Buelow Gould's imprisonment at Macquarie Harbour. Kate Grenville based the novel The Secret River (2005) on the life of her convict ancestor Solomon Wiseman.

Along with bushrangers and other stock characters of colonial life, convicts were a popular subject during Australia's silent film era. The first convict film was a 1908 adaptation of Marcus Clarke's For the Term of His Natural Life, shot on location at Port Arthur with an unheard-of budget of £7000, equivalent to A$1.11 million in 2022. This was followed by two more films inspired by Clarke's novel: The Life of Rufus Dawes (1911), which draws on Alfred Dampier's stage production of His Natural Life, and the landmark For the Term of His Natural Life (1927), one of the most expensive silent films ever made. W. J. Lincoln directed many convict melodramas including It Is Never Too Late to Mend (1911), an adaptation of Charles Reade's 1856 novel about cruelties of the convict system; Moodyne (1913), based on John Boyle O'Reilly's novel; and Transported (1913). Other early titles include Sentenced for Life, The Mark of the Lash, One Hundred Years Ago, The Lady Outlaw and The Assigned Servant, all released in 1911. Few convict films were made after 1930; even the Australian New Wave of the 1970s, with its emphasis on Australia's colonial past, largely avoided the convict era in favour of nostalgic period pieces set in the bush around the time of Federation. One exception is Journey Among Women (1977), a feminist imagining of what life was like for convict women. Alexander Pearce, the infamous Tasmanian convict and cannibal, is the inspiration for The Last Confession of Alexander Pearce (2008), Dying Breed (2008) and Van Diemen's Land (2009). The British film Comrades (1986) deals with the transportation of the Tolpuddle Martyrs to Australia.

== Notable convicts transported to Australia ==
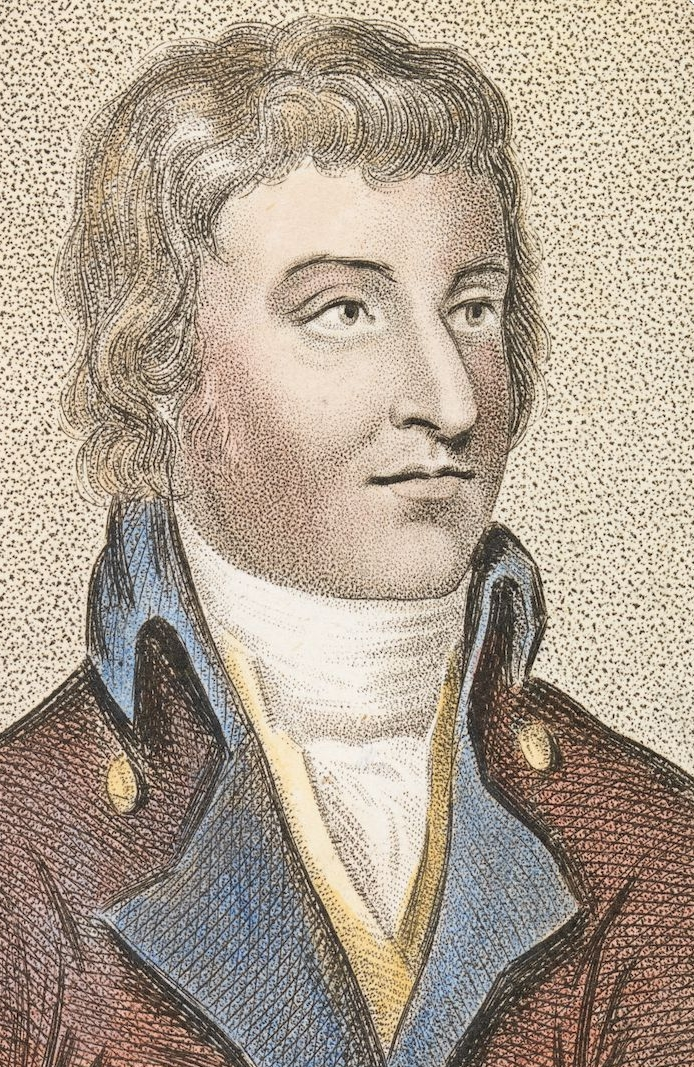
George Barrington

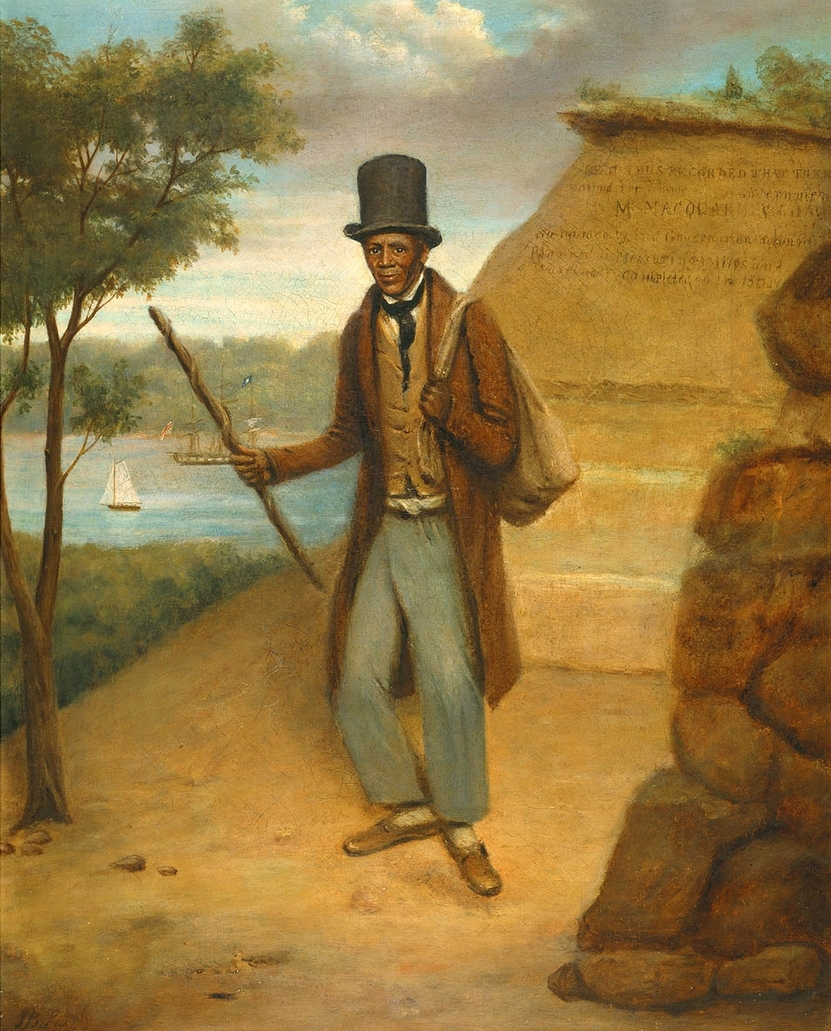
Billy Blue

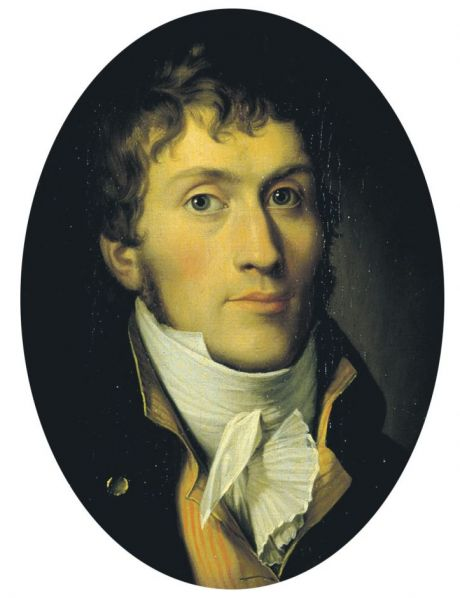
Jørgen Jørgensen

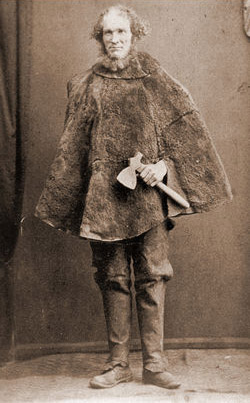
Moondyne Joe

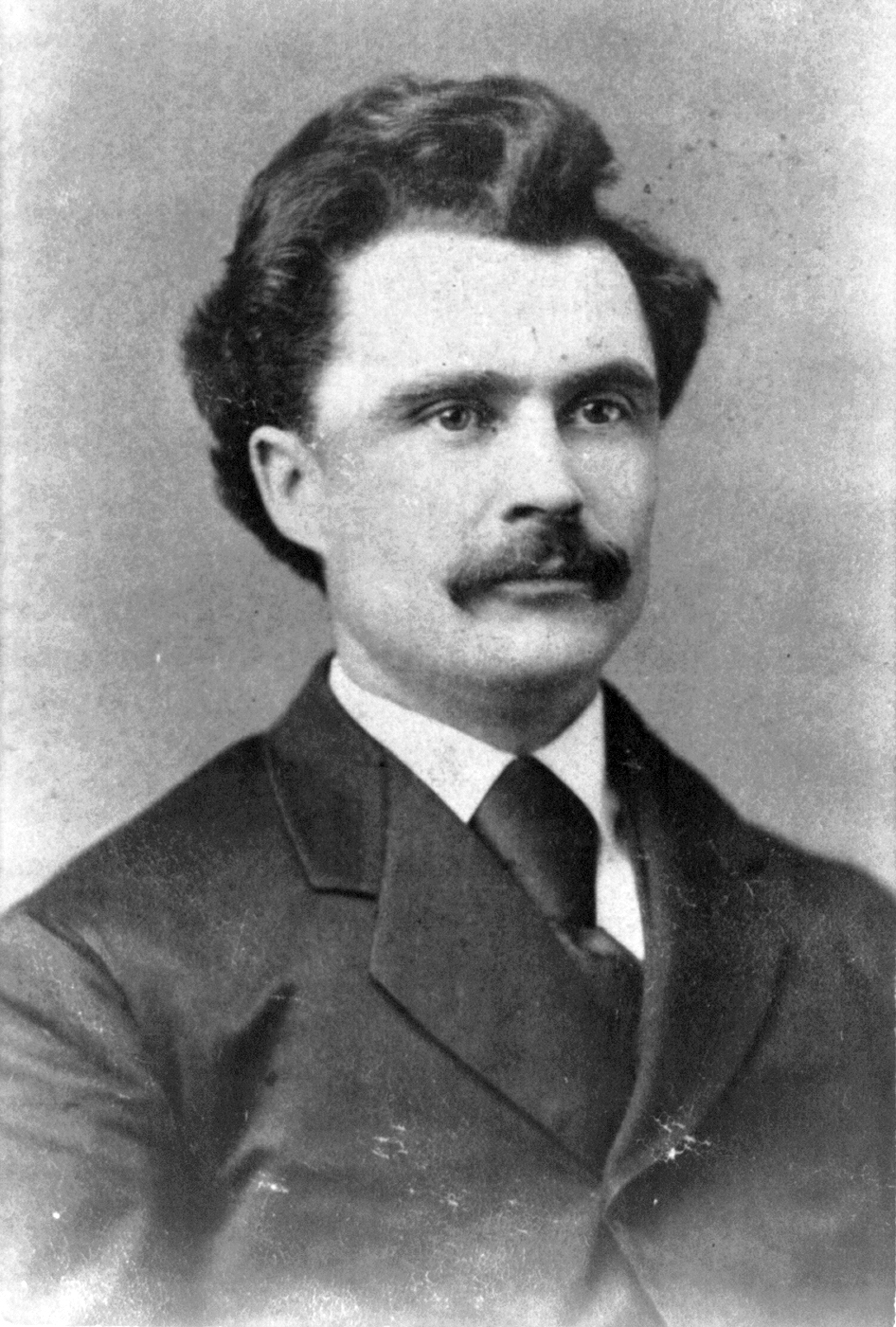
John Boyle O'Reilly

- Esther Abrahams – British Jew, who was one of about 1,000 convicts who were Jewish and was the common-law wife of a leader of the Rum Rebellion.
- George Barrington – pickpocket, superintendent of convicts and high constable of Parramatta
- Samuel Barsby – one of the first two coopers in Australia and the first convict to be flogged
- Joseph Backler – transported for passing forged cheques, became a colonial painter
- William Bannon – transported from New Zealand to Van Diemen's Land for army desertion/theft. Escaped Port Arthur through the 'dog line' at EagleHawk Neck.
- Billy Blue – a Black man from Jamaica, New York, established a ferry service
- James Blackburn – Famous for contribution to Australian architecture and civil engineering
- William Bland – naval surgeon transported for killing a man in a duel; he prospered and was involved in philanthropy, and had a seat in the legislative assembly.
- Mary Bryant – a famous escapee
- William Buckley – famously escaped and lived with Aboriginal people for many years
- John Cadman – had been a publican, as a convict became Superintendent of Boats in Sydney; Cadmans Cottage is a cottage granted to him.
- Martin Cash – Famous escapee and bushranger
- John Caesar - Australia's first bushranger
- William Chopin – a convict whose work in prison hospitals in Western Australia grounded him in chemistry; on receiving a ticket of leave he was appointed chemist at the Colonial Hospital, but preferred to open his own chemist shop. He was later convicted of attempting to procure abortions.
- Daniel Connor – sentenced to seven years' transportation for sheep-stealing, became a successful merchant, by the 1890s one of the largest landowners in central Perth.
- Daniel Cooper – successful merchant.
- Constance Couronne – youngest female convict transported to Australia (10 years of age)
- William Cuffay (convict and tailor) – a prominent Black London Chartist leader who led the development of Australia's labour movement
- John Davies – co-founded The Mercury newspaper.
- Margaret Dawson – First Fleeter, "founding mother"
- John Eyre – painter and engraver
- William Field – notable Tasmanian businessman and landowner
- Francis Greenway – famous Australian architect
- William Henry Groom – successful auctioneer and politician, served in the inaugural Australian Parliament.
- Michael Howe – bushranger, subject of the first work of general literature published in Australia
- Laurence Hynes Halloran – founded Sydney Grammar School.
- William Hutchinson – public servant and pastoralist.
- John Irving – doctor transported on First Fleet, was the first convict to receive an absolute pardon.
- Mark Jeffrey – wrote a famous autobiography
- Jørgen Jørgensen – eccentric Danish adventurer influenced by revolutionary ideas who declared himself ruler of Iceland, later became a spy in Britain.
- Henry Kable – First Fleet convict, arrived with wife and son (Susannah Holmes, also a convict, and Henry) filed first lawsuit in Australia, became a wealthy businessman
- Lawrence Kavenagh – notorious bushranger
- John "Red" Kelly – Irish convict and father of bushranger Ned Kelly
- Solomon Levey – wealthy merchant, endowed Sydney Grammar School.
- Simeon Lord – pioneer merchant and magistrate in Australia
- Nathaniel Lucas – one of the first convicts on Norfolk Island, where he became Master carpenter, later farmed successfully, built windmills, and was Superintendent of carpenters in Sydney.
- John Mitchel – Irish nationalist
- Francis "Frank the Poet" McNamara – composer of various oral convict ballads, including The Convict's Tour to Hell
- John Mortlock – a former marine
- Thomas Muir – convicted of sedition for advocating parliamentary reform; escaped from NSW and after many vicissitudes made his way to revolutionary France.
- Isaac Nichols – entrepreneur, first Postmaster
- Kevin Izod O'Doherty – Medical student, Young Irelander who was transported for treason.
- Robert Palin – once in Australia, committed further crimes and was executed for a non-capital offence
- Alexander Pearce – cannibal escapee
- Sarah Phillips – Prostitute from Bristol sent to Van Diemen's Land for theft. Later married ticket of leave convict James Ratcliffe who received a reward of twenty-five pounds for capturing a bushranger single-handed.
- Elizabeth Pulley – First Fleet convict who married Anthony Rope; they had 8 children including the first male European child conceived and born in Australia.
- Joseph Potaskie – first Pole to come to Australia.
- William Smith O'Brien – famous Irish revolutionary; sent to Van Diemen's Land in 1849 after leading a rebellion in County Tipperary
- John Boyle O'Reilly – Famous escapee, poet, and writer; author of Moondyne
- William Redfern – one of the few surgeon convicts
- Mary Reibey – businesswoman and shipowner
- John Matthew Richardson – gardener and botanical collector who accompanied many expeditions of exploration in Australia such as John Oxley's 1823 and 1824 expeditions to what would become Queensland and Thomas Livingstone Mitchell's Australia Felix expedition to South Australia and Victoria in 1836.
- Anthony Rope – First Fleet convict; pioneer farmer married to Elizabeth Pulley for 50 years; Ropes Creek and suburb Ropes Crossing, New South Wales named after them.
- James Ruse – successful farmer
- Henry Savery – Australia's first novelist; author of Quintus Servinton
- Robert Sidaway – opened Australia's first theatre
- Ikey Solomon – professional thief; inspiration for the character Fagin in Charles Dickens' novel Oliver Twist
- James Squire – Romanichal (English Romany); First Fleet convict and Australia's first brewer and cultivator of hops.
- David Stuurman, a revered South African chief transported for anti-colonial insurrection
- William Sykes – historically interesting because he left a brief diary and a bundle of letters.
- John Tawell – served his sentence, became a prosperous chemist, returned to England after 15 years, and after some time murdered a mistress, for which he was hanged.
- Samuel Terry – wealthy merchant and philanthropist.
- Andrew Thompson – transported in 1791 aged 18, he rose to Chief Constable in the Hawkesbury district; major cereal farmer, businessman, ship owner, government official and largest private employer in the colony. In 1810 he was the first ex-convict to be appointed as magistrate.
- James Hardy Vaux – author of Australia's first full-length autobiography and dictionary.
- Mary Wade – one of the youngest female convicts transported to Australia (13 years of age) who had 21 children and at the time of her death had over 300 living descendants.
- William Westwood – bushranger and leader of the 1846 Cooking Pot Uprising
- Joseph Wild – explorer
- Solomon Wiseman – merchant and ferry operator on Hawkesbury River, hence town name Wisemans Ferry, New South Wales.

== See also ==
- British prison hulks
- Convict assignment
- Convict era of Western Australia
- Convict hulk
- Convict ships to New South Wales
- Convict ships to Tasmania
- Convicts on the West Coast of Tasmania
- Cyprus mutiny, in Tasmania 1829
- Forced labour
- French ship Neptune (1818)
- History of public health in Australia
- List of convicts on the First Fleet
- The Fatal Shore 1986 history by Robert Hughes
- Transport Board (Royal Navy)
- Convict crisis of 1849
