= Convict melodrama =

Genre of Australian theatre

A convict melodrama is a type of melodrama set in Australia during the convict era. They normally revolved around stories of innocent people wrongly accused of a crime who were transported to Australia as convicts. The best known work in this field was the novel For the Term of His Natural Life, which was adapted into various plays and films.

These melodramas were highly popular in novel, theatre and film form in the late nineteenth and early twentieth century. They had their origins in novels such as Les Misérables.

== Select works ==
=== Novels ===
- The Broad Arrow by Caroline Leakey (writing as Oline Keese) (1859)
- It Is Never Too Late to Mend by Charles Reade
- For the Term of His Natural Life by Marcus Clarke (also theatre adaptations)

=== Films ===
- For the Term of His Natural Life (1908)
- The Life of Rufus Dawes (1911)
- The Lady Outlaw (1911)
- It Is Never Too Late to Mend (1911)
- The Romantic Story of Margaret Catchpole (1911)
- Transported (1913)
- His Convict Bride (1918)
- For the Term of His Natural Life (1927)
- Botany Bay (1953)
- Eliza Fraser (1975)

=== TV ===
- Against the Wind (1978) (mini-series)
- Sara Dane (1983) (mini-series)
- For the Term of His Natural Life (1983) (mini-series)
- The Potato Factory (2000) (mini-series)
- The Incredible Journey of Mary Bryant (2005) (mini series)
