= Founders and Survivors =

Collaborative data initiative about Tasmanian history

The Founders and Survivors project began in 2007 as a collaborative initiative between several universities, government agencies, demographers, genealogists, and population health researchers. The project extracted data related to convicts in Australia who were transported to Van Diemen's Land or born there between 1803-1900.

== Project goals ==
The project's aim was to build a dataset of life course history generated from the extensive collection of Tasmanian convict records. This data was used to examine the long-term impact of convict transportation on future health and well-being. The project later expanded to include a study of the inter-generational transmission of inequality and risk of conviction.

== Convict records ==
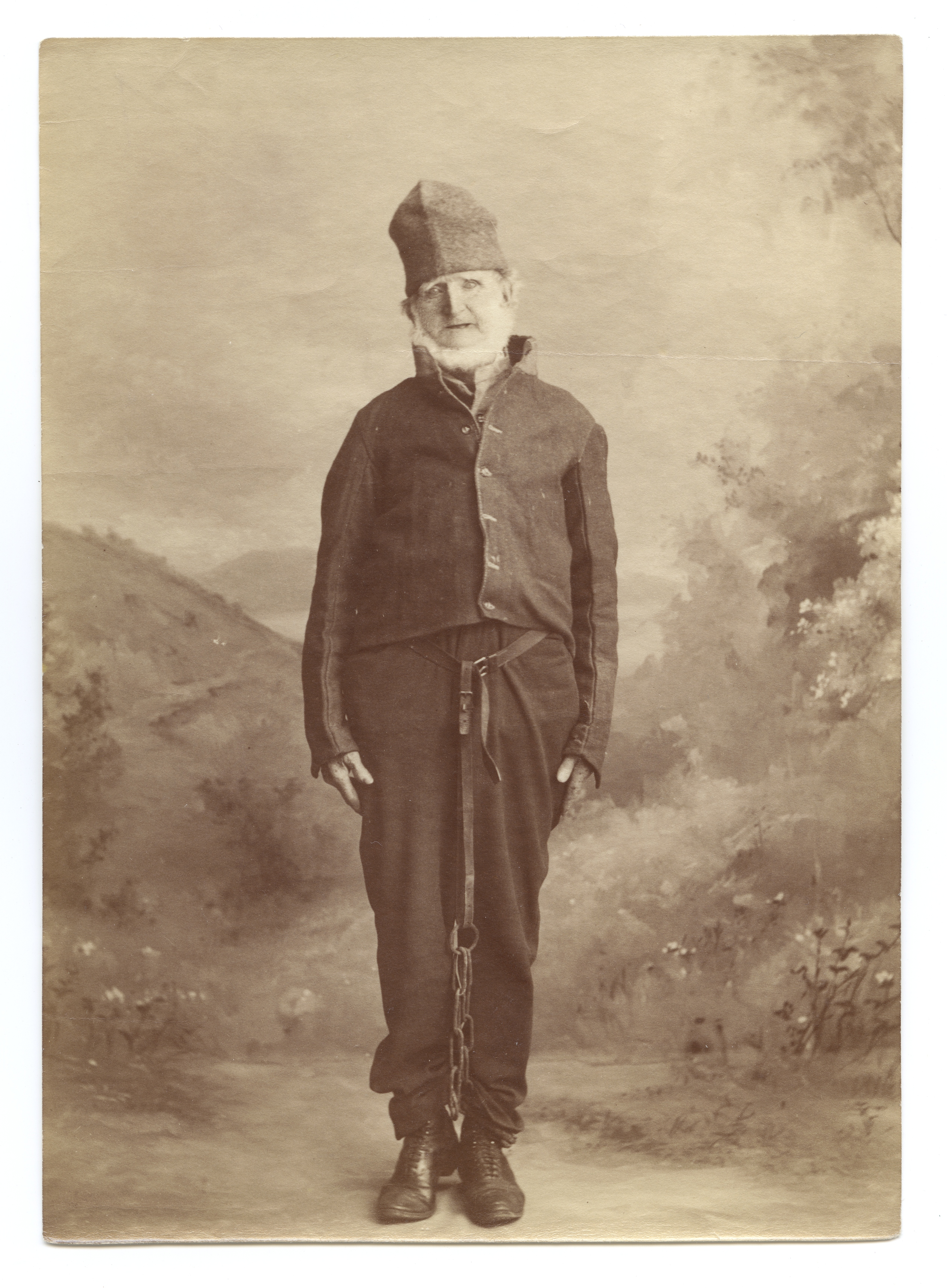
Studio portrait of convict Bill Thompson

The convict records of Tasmania's colonial founders and survivors are held by the State Library of New South Wales and the Tasmanian Archives and Heritage Office accessible through LINC Tasmania. These convict records are listed on the UNESCO Memory of the World International Register as being a record of forced emigration at the beginning of the modern age of globalisation which transformed the lives of those British and Irish convicts, and largely destroyed the lives and culture of Australia's Indigenous people. In addition to administrative records, data from Government Gazettes provided details of convict assignment to free settlers.

== Project framework ==
The project relied on the mass-digitisation of over 100,000 images, manual transcription of the convict records, XML record matching, volunteer crowdsourcing, creation of a customised genealogical database for population and family history analysis, and statistical analyses.

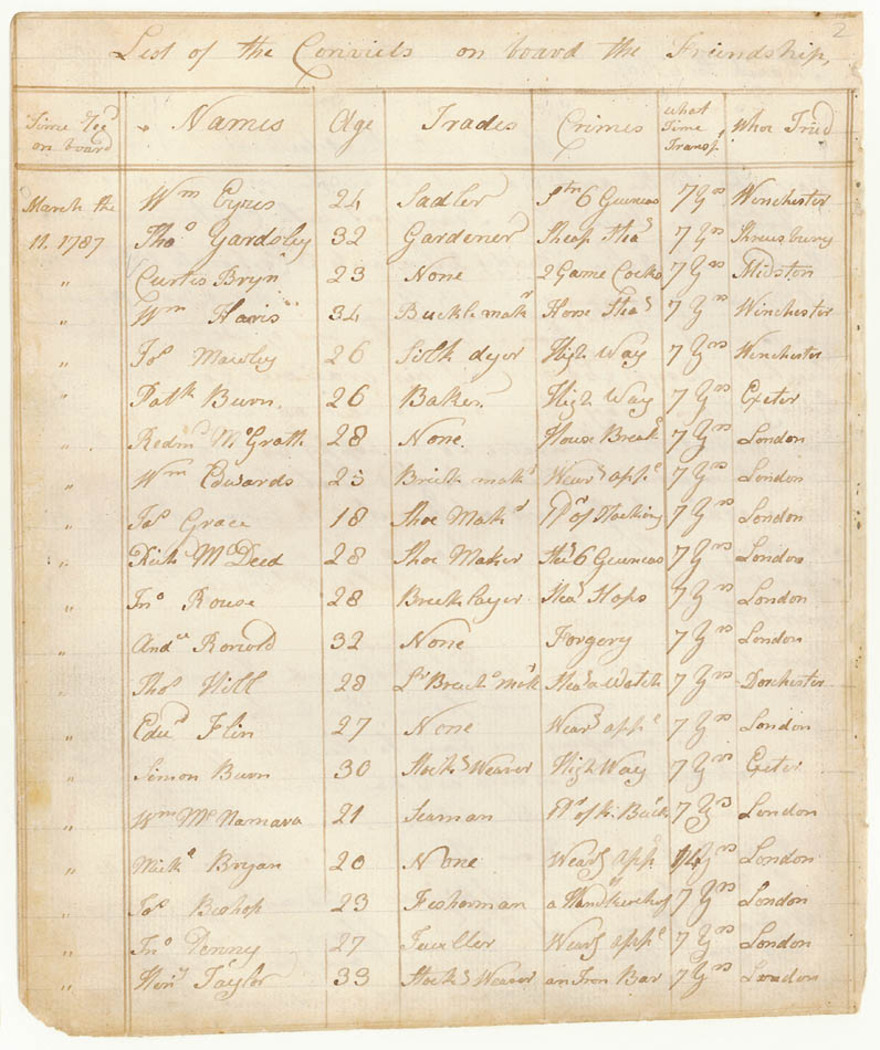
Example of the convict records held by the NSW State Library

Data was collected from convict records of the 76,820 men, women, and children transported to Tasmania (Van Diemen's Land) during the 19th century as well as their descendants. Records kept by the government administrators of the convict system included detailed descriptions of height, eye colour, hair colour, facial characteristics, literacy level, trade skills, place of birth, family history, past crimes, sentence, behaviour during incarceration, later punishments, grants of pardon, tickets of leave, marriage, and death. By tracing family histories, data was collected on life span, health, future occupations and geographical movement of the convicts and their descendants. Comparison with services records of descendants who served in the AIF in World War investigated changes in height, childhood diet and health, and resilience under stress.

Data from the Founders and Survivors project was linked to the Digital Panopticon project which studied the lives of 90,000 British citizens convicted of crimes at the Old Bailey in London between 1780 and 1925.

== Founders and survivors online database ==
The Founders and Survivors Online Database of Tasmanian Convicts (1818-1853) is a searchable database accessible by the public which includes data on all the convicts transported to Tasmania in the 19th century. The database is managed by The University of Melbourne and accessible through Research Data Australia. Users can search for individual records by First Name, Surname or Police Number with access to all conduct registers and ship logs.

== Education ==
The project has been translated into a number of educational resources that tell the stories of Tasmania's convicts. These include Lifelines stories told in film and song, as well as the Mugsheets interactive online face-making app.

== See also ==
- Convict tramway
