= John Cadman (convict) =

Convict transported to Australia

- Born: 1758; England
- Died: 12 November 1848 (aged 89–90); Sydney, Australia
- Occupation: Superintendent of Government Boats
- Spouse: Elizabeth Mortimer

John Cadman (1772 – 12 November 1848) worked as a pub operator in England, before becoming a convict and being transported to Australia.

== Outline of life ==
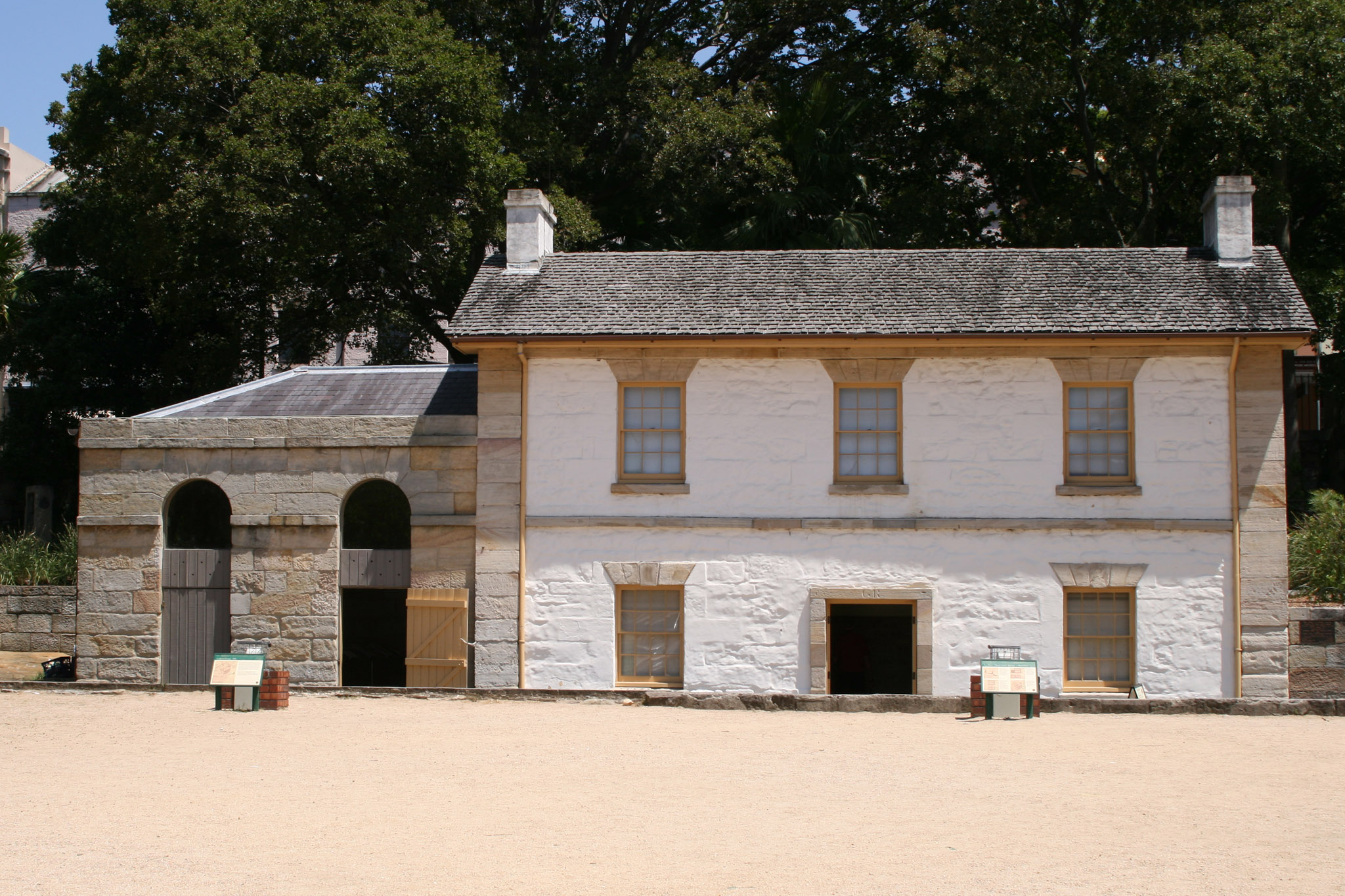
Cadmans Cottage

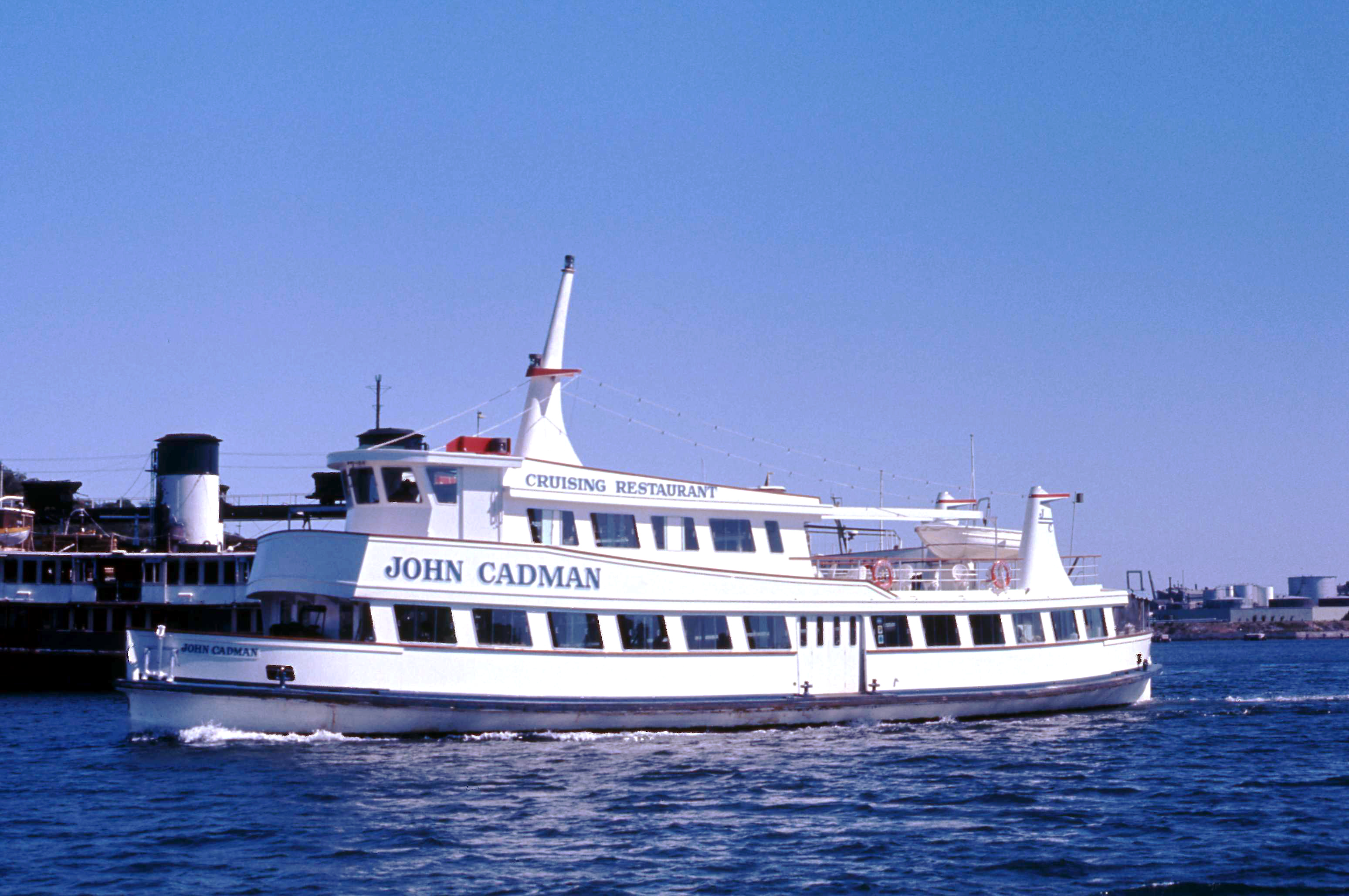
MV John Cadman on Sydney Harbour in 1973

On 11 March 1797, Cadman was sentenced to transportation for life at the Worcester assizes, after being arrested at Bewdley on the charge of stealing a horse. Cadman was transported aboard Barwell, which left Portsmouth on 7 November 1797 and reached Sydney on 18 May 1798.

In 1809, Cadman became the coxswain of a government boat. While in the service of the Government as a coxswain, he lost an eye. Cadman received a conditional pardon from Governor Lachlan Macquarie in 1814 and a free pardon in 1821. Cadman became the master of the cutter Mars in 1825, which took 25 prisoners to Newcastle. He was then promoted to the position of Superintendent of Government Boats at Sydney in 1827 on a salary of £91, until he retired in 1845. When that position of office was abolished in 1845, Governor Sir George Gipps recommended "his great respectability" and arranged for him to be paid a retiring gratuity of £182.

Since 1816 Cadman had occupied a rough stone cottage at The Rocks. Cadmans Cottage still stands today and is the oldest surviving house within the city of Sydney. On 5 or 6 January 1818, Cadman received government permission to marry at Sydney. On 26 October 1830 John married Elizabeth Mortimer.

Cadman died on 12 November 1848 and was survived by Elizabeth Mortimer and her two daughters from a previous alliance. Cadman was buried in the old Devonshire Street Cemetery (now Central railway station, Sydney's main terminus); his headstone and remains were taken to Bunnerong Cemetery (now Eastern Suburbs Memorial Park) in 1901. Cadman's headstone still remains there and the inscription reads:

Sacred to the memory of John Cadman who departed this life on Sunday the 12 day of November 1848 at the advanced age of 90 years and 10 months. He has been a resident of Sydney for 55 years the whole of which time he has held responsible situations under government. For the last 25 years was principal superintendent of government boats at the dock yard Sydney, the departure of Sir George Gipps from this colony he resigned. Not at age wishing to serve any other governor. Consequence of which the establishment conducted by him for so many years with such general satisfaction was entirely broken up: he was respected by all who knew him. He left a wife and two daughters to deplore the loss of an affectionate husband and father.

Three cruise vessels on Sydney Harbour were named after Cadman; the 1974 built John Cadman, the 1986 built John Cadman II and the 1989 built John Cadman III.
