= Cadmans Cottage =

Heritage-listed building in Sydney, New South Wales, Australia

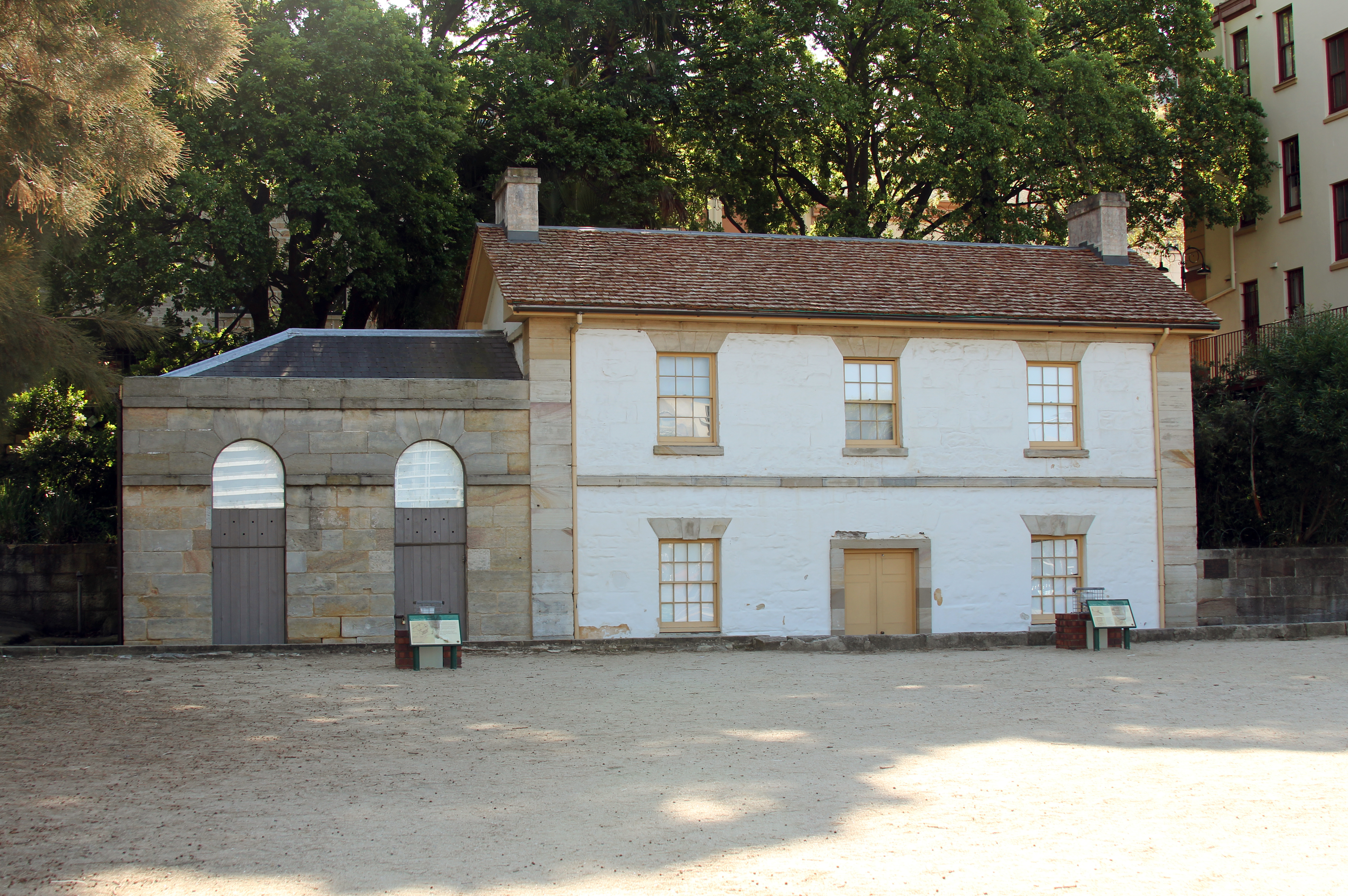
- The façade of Cadmans Cottage

- Location within Sydney Location within Australia
- 33°51′32″S 151°12′33″E
- Location: 110 George Street, The Rocks, City of Sydney, New South Wales, Australia

History
- Built: 1815–1816

Site notes
- Architect: Francis Greenway (suspected)
- Architectural style: Old Colonial Georgian
- Owner: Department of Planning & Environment

New South Wales Heritage Register
- Official name: Cadmans Cottage; Cadman's Cottage
- Type: State heritage (complex / group)
- Designated: 2 April 1999
- Reference no.: 981
- Type: Cottage
- Category: Residential buildings (private)

Cadmans Cottage or Cadman's Cottage is a heritage-listed former water police station and sailor's home and now visitor attraction located at 110 George Street in the inner city Sydney suburb of The Rocks in the City of Sydney local government area of New South Wales, Australia. The property is owned by Department of Planning & Environment, an agency of the Government of New South Wales. It was added to the New South Wales State Heritage Register on 2 April 1999.

Cadmans Cottage is the second-oldest surviving residential building in Sydney, having been built in 1816 for the use of the governmental coxswains and their crews. The building is heavily steeped in the history of Sydney, also claiming the title as the first building to have been built on the shoreline of The Rocks area. It is claimed that during high tide, the water would come within 2.4 metres (8 ft) of Cadmans Cottage; however, due to the reclamation of land during the building of Circular Quay, the waterline has moved about 100 metres (330 ft) away since 1816.

The building has had several different uses in its lifetime; first and foremost as the abode of the four governmental coxswains (from 1816 until 1845), the headquarters of the Sydney Water Police (from 1845 to 1864) and as the Sailor's Home (from 1865 to 1970). Restoration of Cadmans Cottage began in 1972 after it was proclaimed a heritage site under the National Parks and Wildlife Act and control of the site was handed over to the Sydney Cove Redevelopment Authority. A major archaeological investigation occurred in 1988 (in preparation for the bicentennial redevelopment) and since then, only minor maintenance works have been completed on the building. The building is now used as the home for the Sydney Harbour National Parks Information Centre and can be viewed by the public.

== History ==
=== The formation of the Government Dockyard ===
Before 1797, government shipbuilding was carried out only on the eastern side of Sydney Cove. In July 1797, a site for shipbuilding was designated on the western side of the Cove. The yard became operational at the end of that year, with fences, gates and the construction of two timber sheds and a house in the north of the yard for the principle shipwright. In 1798, additions and improvements were made including the roofing of a workshop and storehouse, construction of a watch house, an apartment for the clerk, a joiners shop and a smithy. By 1804, a long open fronted building, probably a boat shed, had been constructed along the George Street frontage, and is illustrated in various views of Sydney Harbour.

There were complaints about the lack of facilities and the standard of construction of the buildings, most of which were in poor condition by 1806. A building used by the boat crews and Coxswains was reported as needing repairs and was probably demolished in 1816 on the completion of the Coxswain's Barracks, later known as Cadmans. In 1810, Lachlan Macquarie became Governor and initiated a major programme of public works, including the upgrading of the government dockyard, though little if any of this work was carried out before 1816.

=== Phase II: 1816–1846: The Coxswain's Barracks ===
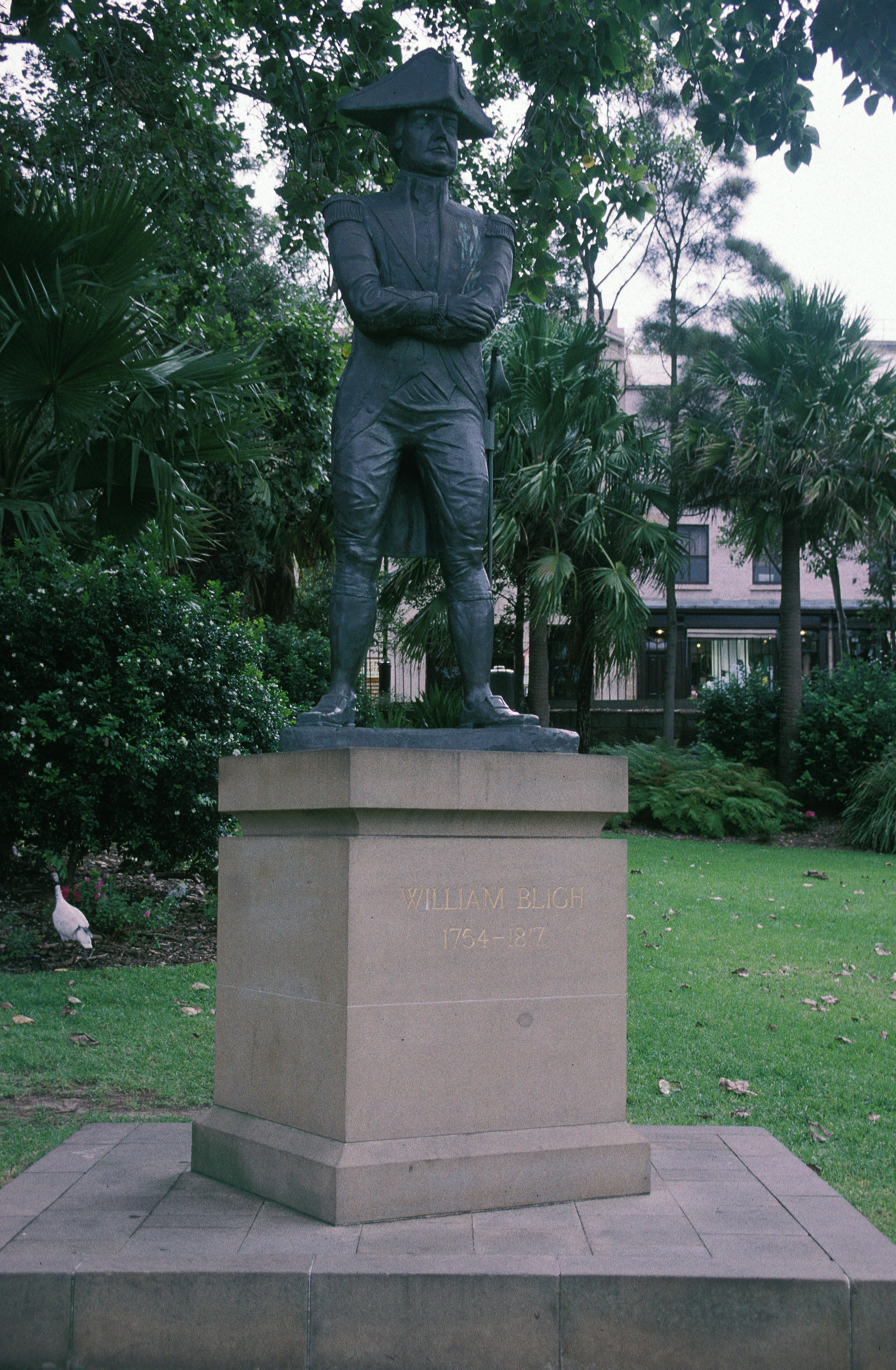
Captain William Bligh statue next to the house.

There are no official records of the date of construction of the Coxswains' Barracks, now knows as Cadmans Cottage, after the longest serving government Coxswains, John Cadman. Based on the evidence of a series of sketches by James Wallis it was built between late 1815 and early 1816, on land adjoining the Government Dockyard. Wallis' drawing of the West Side of Sydney Cove, prepared between January and May 1816 shows the completed two-storey stone building located on the waters edge.

There are no known plans or specification for the building, nor records of payment for its construction. The absence of a record of payment from the Police Fund, the construction of the dockyard wall in 1818, has led Francis Greenway directed the construction of Cadman's. Tropman and Associates also consider it possible that Greenway designed the building in his capacity as Acting Colonial Architect but there is as yet no solid evidence for Greenway's involvement and this must still be considered speculative.

The harbour was the focus of the city and Cadmans as the headquarters of the Government Boats, played a key role in the early development of Sydney. The Cottage was built up against a protruding rock shelf, below the level of George Street to take advantage of its shoreline location for supervision of the Government Boats. These were either moored close by or pulled up on the shore in front, but it is highly unlikely that they would have been brought into the building given the scale of the lower room and the original doorway.

The Coxswains' Barracks (Cadmans Cottage), was occupied by the government coxswains and it probably originally served both as an office and as quarters for some of the boat crews, though the later coxswains appear to have lived there with their families. The coxswain supervised shipping on the harbour and was responsible for rostering the boat crews who were employed in the procurement and transportation of timber, grass, shells (for lime) and stores. The coxswains also provided crews for the Governor's Barge and the naval Officer's boats.

The post of government coxswain was held by four people;

1. Bernard Williams, from 1807–1822
2. David Smith, from 1822–1823
3. John von Mangerhouse Weiss, from 1823–1826; and
4. John Cadman, from 1827–1845.

Cadman was the longest serving of the coxswains. In 1798, he was transported to NSW for horse stealing and in the records of the Muster for Sydney for 1814 is shown as having received an unconditional pardon. He probably started work at the dockyard as Assistant Government Coxswain around the time that Williams was appointed as Coxswain. In 1823, Cadman was appointed as master of the government cutter Mars which was wrecked in 1926. Cadman was removed from his post following the sinking of the Mars and applied for another position in the dockyard. In 1827, when Weiss resigned Cadman was appointed as coxswain. Cadman married Elizabeth Mortimer, who had two daughters, on 26 October 1830 at St Phillip's Church. They all lived at the Cottage until his step-daughters married in 1842 and 1845.

Cadman held the position of coxswain and occupied the Cottage until he retired in 1845. Francis Low's Directory for 1847 advertises the John Cadman Steam Packet Hotel at Parramatta confirming that he had departed from Sydney by this time. Following his retirement the post of Government Coxswain was abolished and the functions were taken over by various other bodies, including the Water Police, Customs and private traders. Cadman died in 1848 and was buried in the Sandhills Cemetery until 1901 when work commenced on Central Station and he and his headstone were relocated to Bunnerong Cemetery at Botany.

=== Phase III: 1846–1864: The Water Police ===
The Water Police took over Cadmans between 1846 and 1849 and the building may have been vacant for several years after Cadman's retirement. There is some uncertainty as to the year of occupation of Cadmans by the Water Police. Thorp and Proudfoot believe this to have been around 1847. Thorp quoted the allocation of £400 in the estimates of 1847 "for the establishment of a Police Court on the northern part of the City of Sydney for the purposes of general and Water Police". Though this location is rather vague Kent believes that it does refer to Cadmans but as there is no documentary evidence that any construction was done at this time, or that the funds were spent, questions that the Water Police actually took over the building in this year. The re-establishment of the Water Police was gazetted in January 1847 but the Water Police Office in George Street was not gazetted as a Court of Petty Sessions or a clerk appointed until January 1849, which is considered by Kent to be a more likely time for its occupation by the Water Police.

Some alterations were made to the building around this time. In 1853 tenders were advertised for the construction of an additional room. The specifications for the work sho that a major addition to the southern side of Cadmans Cottage, later referred to as the "keepers room" or "turnkeys room" had already been constructed. There is no record of its construction. It may have been built towards the end of the Coxswain's phase or when the Water Police took over the Cottage. Proudfoot and Tropman attribute the design of the addition to Colonial Architect Mortimer Lewis. However, although the design is consistent with Lewis' work there is, as yet, no documentary evidence to support his involvement.

By the end of 1854, the Water Police offices consisted of a brick walled enclosure, containing a clearing house, the Cottage, with a cell on the lower floor, the keepers room built c. 1835-1847 and on the upper floor the office and presumably living quarters. In 1854 the building was reported as being inadequate for the Water Police's purposes and the next year tenders were let for the construction of a new station. Cadmans continued to be used as a Water Police lock-up and there are records of requests for its repair up until 1857.

During the Water Police's occupation of the cottage major changes to the face of the harbour took place. The quay was extended from the Kings Wharf along the western side of Sydney Cove to Campbells Wharf across the shoreline in front of Cadmans, along the present alignment of Quay Street. The earlier docks of the old Government Dockyard, the rocks above high water, and the beaches on the western side of the Cove, were accessible underneath the new timber wharf and a plan of 1860 shows the area in front of Cadmans as still being covered at high tide.

=== Phase IV: 1864–1970: The Sailors Home ===
In 1863, a proposal for the construction of a Sailors Home was put forward and the site between Cadmans Cottage and the Mariners Chapel to the north was chosen. The report of the Annual Meeting of the Sailors Home in 1864 indicates that Cadmans had been restored as a residence for the manager of the Sailors Home. The Sailors Home, opened in 1864 was only partially completed. The proposed eastern facade and southern wing, which would have required the destruction of Cadmans, was not built because of financial constraints and Cadmans continued as the manager's residence.

The land in front of Cadmans was probably filled and raised sometime between 1870 and 1875, the docks and foreshore were obliterated and the visual association of Cadmans with the harbour was removed. Later during this period the area in front of the Cottage was turned into a garden. In the 1880s, further work on Circular Quay, to increase the capacity of the wharfs was carried out. In 1901 government wharfs became the responsibility of the Sydney Harbour Trust.

In that year the government resumed all land in The Rocks because of an outbreak of bubonic plague and demolished the worst slums for public health reasons. In 1926, the Sailors Home was extended and from then on the managers lived in the main building. In 1927 the Maritime Services Board took control of the entire area. Cadmans was used to accommodate visiting merchant sailor at this time.

In the first thirty years of the 20th century, there was a growing awareness of Australia's past and an awakening of historical interest. This was reflected in the inauguration of the Royal Australian Historical Society in 1901 and an increasing resistance to the demolition of significant buildings. Federation sparked further interest in the early years of European settlement and increased feelings of the need to preserved buildings surviving from the 19th century. Public debate over the demolition of important buildings focussed on two area; Macquarie Street and Circular Quay.

The Taxation Office and Commissariat Store at Circular Quay were both substantial, prominent buildings. The Taxation Office was originally built as a naval officers quarters in 1812 and the Commissariat Store built in 1809–1813 was the oldest Government building extant in the 1930s. In 1937, a committee set up to prepare a development scheme for the area of The Rocks resumed in 1901 recommended that both buildings be demolished. A campaign to save the buildings was fought in the pages of The Sydney Morning Herald and by the Royal Australian Historical Society. It was unsuccessful and they were demolished in 1939. The publicity changed public opinion and this increase in awareness of the need to save old colonial buildings contributed to the success of the campaign to save The Mint and Hyde Park Barracks in Macquarie Street. It was around this time that the historical value of Cadmans was first commented upon. Artist Sydney Long wrote an article in The Sydney Morning Herald in 1939 saying that it was the agitation over the Taxation Office and Commissariat Store which had saved it from demolition.

By the middle of this century Cadmans was of acknowledged historical value, being listed on Cumberland County Council's Register B, as a historic building. In 1950, Cadmans was described as "consisting of four rooms with the usual conveniences", with a galvanised iron roof, and with its main entrance being from George Street, and steps cut in the rock to the site.

=== Phase V: 1970–present: The Historic Site ===
Cadmans was vacant by 1962 and falling into disrepair. In 1964, the Overseas Passenger Terminal was built and the view of Cadmans from the harbour was completely obscured. In 1970, the Sydney Cove Redevelopment Authority took control of The Rocks and Cadmans Cottage was proclaimed as a Historic Site, under the National Parks and Wildlife Act, two years later.

In 1972 Philip Cox, Storey and Partners, architects designed and supervised work on the building, removing much of the archaeological and architectural evidence of changes to the Cottage. The work was poorly documented by today's standards and it is difficult to ascertain the extent of work. An unpublished article by Cox noted that a number of "annexes" were demolished, as were internal partitions upstairs. Many other changes were made and these are discussed below. Following the 1972 work, a display was installed in the lower rooms and the National Parks and Wildlife Foundation opened a shop on the upper level. In the lead-up to Bicentennial redevelopment of this part of Circular Quay an archaeological investigation in the forecourt was undertaken preparatory to landscaping works. The Foundation closed their shop on the upper floor and it was refurbished and reopened as the National Parks and Wildlife shop in 1988.

In 1988 a major archaeological investigation of the site was sponsored by Comrealty Pty Ltd. A large volunteer work force, under the direction of Service Archaeologists carried out excavations within the lower rooms and in the area beneath the paving on the eastern side of the building.

Since this time only minor maintenance work has been undertaken.

== Description ==
=== Phase I – Government Dockyard, 1797–1815 ===
The shoreline in front of Cadmans originally (in 1816) consisted of water-worn sandstone bedrock, which was subsequently overlain by sand deposits following the construction of the Coxswain's barracks. In the 1797 work on the dockyard commenced and additions and improvements were made over the next few years. In 1810, Macquarie became Governor and commenced a programme of building improvements which included the dockyard located next to the Cadmans site.

=== Phase II – Coxswains Barracks, 1816–1846 ===
In late 1815 or 1816, construction of Cadmans commenced and the building is shown as being complete, at least externally, in a drawing of the Cove executed in mid-1816. While claims for Greenway's involvement have not yet been substantiated the building was designed and/or built by an experienced builder or architect as it demonstrates a number of features of "well considered architectural detailing and proportioning". These features include a dressed stone plinth at the base of the building, ashlar sandstone pilasters and sandstone string courses at the first floor level and eaves. These features are similar to those used in buildings designed by Greenway, amongst them Hyde park Barracks.

The windows were double hung, timber framed, 12-paned windows upstairs and 16-paned windows downstairs symmetrically placed on the facade of the building. Based on the evidence of the Wallis 1816 drawing and analysis of mortar samples, the two storeys of the building appear to have been constructed at the same time. the doors were timber with six panels and external stone architraves. The walls were built from sandstone rubble, finished internally with a limestone or shell lime plaster.

During the 1972 work, Casuarina shingles were discovered under the corrugated iron roof leading Philip Cox, Storey and Partners to believe these to be the original roofing material. The roof was timber framed and originally had triangular gable ends. The floor of the lower room was comprised partly of sandstone bedrock, which may have been overlain by timber decking. Any other evidence of the original floor levels in this room was presumably destroyed by the 1972 works.

The 1816 sketch shows the building without chimneys and these are not depicted until sketches dated later than 1820, indicating that fireplaces were not installed until about five years after the building was first finished. The chimneys were symmetrically located on the north and south elevations. The internal arrangement and use of the rooms is not known, though the room on the lower floor was divided by a near central wall. A large fireplace, added after construction, was located at the northern end of the lower room and its size has been taken to indicate a non-domestic use. Steps beneath the sandstone paving were uncovered during the archaeological investigation; at the western end these were cut into the bedrock and at the eastern end they were built from sandstone masonry and probably predate 1828. The first retaining wall may also have been built around this time.

In summary, the building as originally constructed, with sandstone pilasters, two string courses, a sandstone plinth and a roof with triangular gable ends, was a formal official Old Colonial Georgian structure. Georgian architecture developed in England during the reigns of Georges I, II and III and the first designed buildings in Australia belonged to this style, though by this time it was no longer in vogue in England. Georgian buildings characteristically have a human scale, rectangular and prismatic shapes and symmetrical facades. Cadmans is of rectangular form and its plinth and pilasters are features of classical Georgian styling.

The details of the roof (the gable ends) and the symmetrically placed (smaller than existing) chimneys are shown in a pencil sketch by Robert Russell, dated June 12, 1836, held in the Dickson Galleries in Lempriere, Thomas James. This sketch also shows Cadmans enclosed by a stone wall with corner posts, a gate house and a gate fronting onto George Street. An open covered walkway linked Cadmans sketch is very similar in appearance to Hyde Park Barracks and, though of a much small scale, is still clearly an official institutional structure with non of the cottage-like characteristics it later acquired.

A significant addition (the only surviving one) to the southern end of Cadmans was constructed, possibly between 1835 and 1840 or as late as 1846–47. The addition, a single-storey, late Georgian sandstone structure, with two tall arched openings in the eastern facade, parapet and hipped roof, was designed sympathetically to complement the original building. The same walling material was used, the string course and the proportions of the openings repeat those of the original structure and it was also built with a stone linth. The roof was probably originally of slate not shingles, as shown in photos taken during the 1960s. The sandstone bedrock south of the 1816 building was partly excavated and levelled to form the floor of the addition and a section of the south and rear walls.

There is uncertainty about the date of construction of the addition. Because it has been popularly known as the "turnkey" or "keepers" room, with the assumed function of a Watch House or cells it has been accepted that the extension was constructed for that purpose and was therefore built around 1847. It was definitely built by this date because it is shown on plans (see Thorp; 1986: Plan 5), but there is as yet no evidence for the exact time of construction. Its original function is unknown, though Kent has suggested that if it was built during the Coxwain's phase it may have been for storage. She has suggested that more research into the late 1830s period may provide evidence for the time of construction of the extension.

There is also speculation that the addition was designed by Mortimer Lewis, the Colonial Architect appointed in 1835, but again there is no direct evidence of his involvement. Apart from holding the position of Colonial Architect other evidence taken as suggestive of Lewis' involvement are features in the extension considered reminiscent of buildings designed by him. In particular the tall arched openings which are similar in scale and form to the windows of the Water Police Station on Goat Island which he designed. However, like the possible earlier involvement of Greenway, Lewis' input must be considered a matter for interesting speculation until solid evidence is found. Regardless of Lewis' involvement the addition was designed and/or built by a competent and skilled builder or architect, with detailing sympathetic to the original structure.

=== Phase III – The Water Police, 1846–1864 ===
Between 1846 and 1849, the Water Police took over Cadmans following the abolition of the position of Government Coxswain. Thorp, Proudfoot and Tropman believe the southern addition to have been constructed around this time. There is evidence that a dividing wall ran east–west across the room, though whether this was part of the original construction of the addition is not known. A doorway was cut into the southern wall of the 1816 building to provide access though when this was done is also unknown. At a later stage this doorway was filled in and a new smaller fireplace was built, partly over this doorway, at the southern end of the 1816 room (possibly during the Sailor's Home phase).

The larger fireplace at the northern end was infilled. The new fireplace was of a scale more suited to domestic purposes than the northern one and may relate to the transfer of Cadmans to the Sailors Home. In c. 1854–1857 a toilet was built to the south of the addition and at an unknown time a staircase linking the floors was built.

Again the functions of the rooms during this phase are not certain; the extension was referred to as the "turnkey" or "keepers" room and the other room on this level may have been used as cells. The tall arched openings may have been two doorways or a door and a window but there is as yet no evidence for their original treatment. In the 1972 restoration they were glazed and treated as two windows. Photographs taken during this work show that there were insets at the top of the openings with one functioning as a window and the other a door, the date of this arrangement being unknown. Given the sympathetic design of the addition and an emphasis on symmetry, (an accepting that the treatment of such openings in an official institutional building in late Georgian style was likely to be similar to the Water Police Office on Goat Island regardless of the designer) it is considered likely that these two openings were originally both doors or both windows, with masonry inserts at the top of the arches.

The archaeological investigation of the extension shows that a series of five drainage systems was installed to overcome the perennial drainage problems. This also suggests that the use of this space did not alter markedly until much later.

=== Phase IV – The Sailors Home, 1864–1970 ===
During this phase the building and its surroundings underwent a number of changes. The area on the quayside of Cadmans was reclaimed, initially with rubbish dumped from the Sailor's Home and later with foundry waste. A retaining wall, probably the second, was built some time between 1870 and 1880 to level off the reclaimed area. The stone wall and gate house were demolished. A timber skillion lean-to was added to the northern end of the building. The eastern side of Cadmans was turned into a garden and this, the skillion lean-to and a verandah and trellis on the western side, gave the building its cottage-like feeling.

Many internal alterations accompanied the transferral of Cadmans to the Sailors Home. It is likely that the door between the 1816 and c.1835–1847 rooms was sealed and the stairway and a smaller fireplace were installed at this time. The existing doorway to the 1816 room was probably narrowed. A corrugated iron roof replaced the shingles of the 1816 building and the (probable) slate of the addition.

The manager of the Sailors Home lived in Cadmans during the earlier part of this phase but there is little information about the use of the different rooms. In the 1920s the Sailors Home was refurbished and from that time on the manager lived there. The evidence from the archaeological work suggests that a change to the function of the addition took place, possibly around this time. A sewerage pipe was installed in a trench cut into the bedrock and five separate sewer lines were attached at metre intervals, probably with the toilets facing south with the central dividing wall to the rear. While the sewerage system has not been dated it is likely to be 1910 to 1930 in age.

Cadmans was used to provide accommodation for merchant navy officers until at least 1950 but during the 1960s it fell into disrepair and was reclaimed by the state government.

=== Phase V – The Historic Site, 1970–present ===
Cadmans was proclaimed a Historic Site under the National Parks and Wildlife Act in 1972 and Philip Cox, Storey and Partners were engaged to restore the building. The work which they undertook was poorly documented by today's standards and much of the following is based on a series of photos of the exterior taken during work, and on correspondence between the architects and SCRA.

Although it is not clearly documented the aim of the work seems to have been to restore the building to its early to mid-nineteenth century form. The corrugated iron roof of the 1816 building and the slate of the addition were replaced with casuarina shingles. Boxed gable ends replaced the original triangular gable ends on the 1816 roof. Two symmetrically placed chimneys were re-established but these are at a much larger scale than any depicted in sketches of the building from last century.

The timber lean-to at the northern end of Cadmans and the verandah and trellis on the western side were demolished. The window in the western side of Cadmans was re-opened and the window and door in the southern addition were replaced by glazed openings. The door to the 1816 lower room was returned to its (likely) original width, revealing the sandstone lintel engraved with the letters G. R. This indicates the building was erected during the reign of George III, like The Commissariat Store, now demolished. The additional door to the north of the original entry (on the eastern facade) was replaced by a window.

Drainage pipes were relocated to the sides of the pilasters of the 1816 building, cutting through the string course at the first floor level. The plaster or render which covered the lower floor and the western side of the building was removed and the walls were resurfaced with lime wash. Extensive repairs to the external and internal masonry were undertaken and the doors and windows were replaced and painted green.

The work also removed a lot of internal evidence of the evolution of Cadmans and because the interior was not photographed this is even more poorly documented. It appears from correspondence that a substantial amount of the internal structure was demolished, including a dividing wall in the lower 1816 room and partitions, a fireplace and chimney in the upper rooms. New floor boards and ceiling linings were installed in all rooms, the walls were plastered and new sashes and glazing were installed. The toilets in the southern extension had been removed before the 1972 works and it is not known whether the staircase was removed in 1972 or earlier. The archaeological investigation shows that all the evidence of the original floor levels in the lower 1816 room, and overlying archaeological deposits (purportedly c. 1 metre (3 ft 3 in) deep), were destroyed during the 1972 work. The archaeological deposit had been excavated and a layer of sand, river pebbles and a plastic membrane were installed to halt problems with water penetration.

The walls were sandblasted, a new door was installed between the 1816 room and the addition to the south and the floor level in the upper section was raised, perhaps by as much as 600 centimetres (240 in).

=== Modern history ===
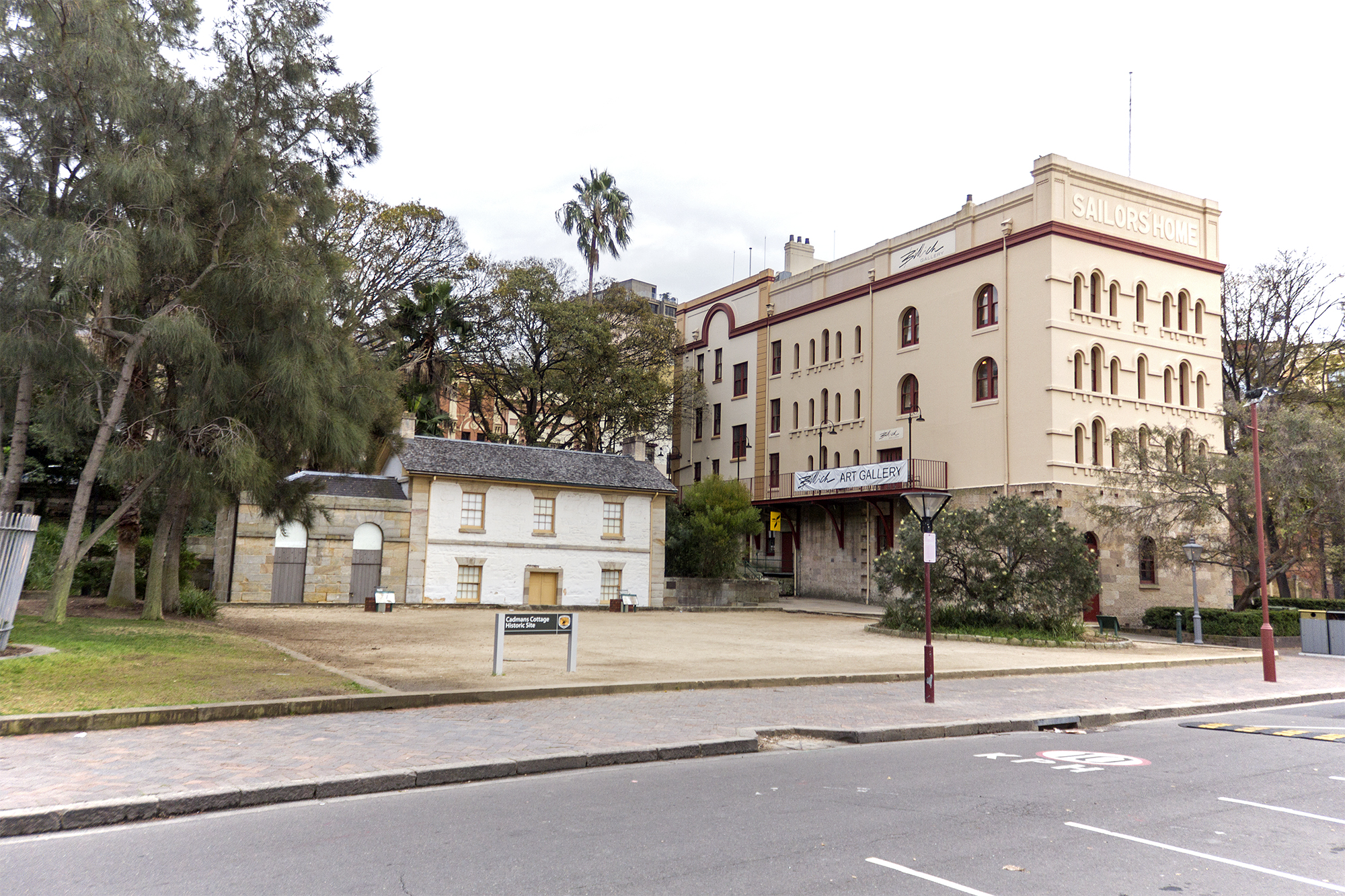
Cadmans Cottage and Sydney Sailors' Home, located in the right background.

It is clear from the foregoing sequence and the historical background that Cadmans and its curtilage have undergone many changes concurrent with the evolving cityscape and quay. The 1972 work removed much of the evidence of these changes and although at the time this was deemed to be acceptable intervention today the approach to the conservation of the building would be somewhat different. Philip Cox, Storey and Partners attempted to restore the building to the phase which is now considered to be the most significant in historical and architectural terms; that of the original 1816 Georgian building with its late Georgian extension to the south.

In terms of the survival of the building's fabric it is also clear that the masonry, including the sandstone plinth (currently partly obscured by deposit), is the only major element surviving from this significant period. Some of the features of the site, including the steps to the cottage at the north-eastern end, and the archaeological deposits under the sandstone flagging and in the southern room also date to this significant phase.

The proportions and relationships of the doors and windows of the 1816 stage of the building were returned to their original Georgian symmetry during the 1972 work. Likewise the two symmetrically located chimneys were rebuilt, but at a much larger scale than originally. The form of the roof with its boxed gable ends, the shingles on the roof of the extension and the glazing of its arched openings have no historical precedent.

== Heritage listing ==
Cadman's Cottage Historic Site is a place with social and historical significance at the national level and architectural and archaeological significance at the state level. It is one of the most important Historic Sites managed by the National Parks and Wildlife Service.

Cadman's Cottage Historic Site has significance at a national level because:

- its survival on the former shoreline of Sydney Cove demonstrates the evolution of the quay and of Sydney itself;
- it is the oldest building in The Rocks and the third oldest building in Sydney city;
- it is a rare and early example of an official colonial building.

Cadman's Cottage Historic Site has significance at the state level because:

- the building is a "document" of two phases of government maritime use, the Government Boats and the Water Police, which are periods of great potential for historical research;
- of its association with the best known and longest serving Government Coxswain, John Cadman and his family and as such is a landmark for cultural tourism;
- the building is a good example of fine Georgian styling, with an unusual example of a sympathetically designed late-Georgian addition;
- the site has great potential for archaeological research, particularly into the original shoreline and the Sailors Home period which is poorly represented in the fabric of the building;
- it illustrates the evolution of the conservation ethos and historic site management principles.

Cadman's Cottage was listed on the New South Wales State Heritage Register on 2 April 1999 having satisfied the following criteria.

The place is important in demonstrating the course, or pattern, of cultural or natural history in New South Wales.

Cadmans Cottage was built in 1816 after which one significant addition to the southern end of the building was constructed between c. 1835 and 1847. It is the oldest building in The Rocks which is the birthplace of the city, the third oldest in the city and one of only ten or so Georgian buildings surviving from pre-1840 Sydney. As the headquarters of the Government boats until 1846 Cadmans was closely associated with Sydney's development and commercial life. Cadmans was a focal point of the harbour upon which the city relied and indicates the extent to which government regulation of the colony depended on control of its waterways. This significant government maritime use continued when Cadmans was taken over by the Water Police. Although the water frontage on the harbour was lost during the Sailors Home phase (when the area to the east of Cadmans was reclaimed) it is now the only building or place able to illustrate the original shoreline of Sydney Cove and to demonstrate the evolution of this part of Sydney Harbour.

The building is associated with a well known, early colonial family. John Cadman was the longest serving Government Coxswain and held the post for eighteen years. He lived in the barracks during this period with his wife, Elizabeth Mortimer and her two daughters who grew up during the family's occupation of the Barracks. The first two stages of the building's occupation, the Coxswain's and the Water Police phases, are both periods little researched, but of considerable interest in Australian history and are best represented in the surviving fabric. The third phase of occupation the Sailors Home is that least represented in the surviving fabric.

The place is important in demonstrating aesthetic characteristics and/or a high degree of creative or technical achievement in New South Wales.

The building was constructed with attention to detail and formal design elements that reflected its role as an official government building. These included a sandstone plinth, string courses at the eaves and first floor level, ashlar sandstone pilasters and a pitched roof with triangular gable ends. An 1836 sketch of the site, with its stone wall, gate and gate house echo Hyde Park Barracks and confirm Cadmans as a formal, official building.

While claims for Francis Greenway's authorship are still unsubstantiated, the fine Georgian styling demonstrates that Cadmans was built or designed by a competent and experienced builder or architect. While the Georgian style of architecture was the norm for government buildings and the grander private houses in the early period of the colony's history, fewer than ten such buildings survive from pre-1840 in Sydney today. Cadmans is the only known example of an early colonial building with an addition that is sympathetically and competently designed in late-Georgian style. In short the building is a rare example of an official colonial barrack building and one of the oldest surviving structures in the country.

The place has a strong or special association with a particular community or cultural group in New South Wales for social, cultural or spiritual reasons.

The site has social significance for many reasons. It has become a symbol of early Sydney because of its location on the original shoreline of Sydney Cove, its age and its aura of historical authenticity. It is associated with the best known and longest serving Government Coxswain, John Cadman, one of the better known of Sydney's historical figures from the first half of last century, and his family.

Cadmans' human, comfortable scale contrasts with the modern city and it imparts a sense of place, time and historical authenticity. The atmosphere that Cadmans conveys is in contrast to the commercialised and uniformly sanitised character of other tourist destinations in The Rocks and is often favourably commented on by visitors.

The sales outlet on the upper level of Cadmans detracts somewhat from this atmosphere. Visitors wishing to experience the oldest building in The Rocks step into a "capsule" which could be located anywhere in Sydney and which is unrelated to the rest of the building and site. The shop contains information and objects that are irrelevant to the history of the building or to Sydney Cove, being largely indistinguishable from items on offer through The Rocks and this increases the incongruous feeling. In this sense the presence of the Service's shop diminishes the significance of the site and should therefore be removed.

The social significance of Cadmans today is demonstrated in the public interest shown in the site. Commercial tour operators, such as The Rocks Walking Tours use it as the focal point for their excursions, beginning their tours outside the building. It is visited by many tourists and is the destination for a large number of school excursions. Activities focussed on the site have also generated a great deal of public interest, for example the public archaeology project in 1988 which involved a large work force of volunteers, received thousands of visitors and constant media coverage.

In summary Cadmans Cottage Historic Site has social significance on a national level because of its age, its survival on the original shore line of Sydney Cove and its association with an early colonial family.

Cadmans Cottage has great potential to tell the story of the growth of Sydney, to illustrate the changes to the face of the harbour and to explain the importance of the Government maritime role during this period.

Cadmans Cottage has potential as a place for the Service to present the story of its historic sites, particularly those around the harbour which share its history. The Service is the state government department with the greatest responsibility for managing a range of historic resources, although its public image is primarily of a nature conservation organisation. Cadmans is the most visited, accessible Historic Site in the state and if planned and managed would be the focus for interpretation of the many Service historic sites around the harbour.

The place has potential to yield information that will contribute to an understanding of the cultural or natural history of New South Wales.

The earliest archaeological evidence at the site was uncovered by Gojak's work and revealed the rocky foreshore upon which Cadmans was built. Steps leading to the oldest surface in front of the cottage were also uncovered beneath the sandstone flagging on the eastern side of the building. The evidence under the flagging is considered highly significant as it spans the transition from rocky foreshore to fill.

The courtyard/reclaimed area in front of the cottage, investigated by Thorp in 1986, lacked evidence pre-dating the construction of Cadmans and the first two phases of occupation by the Government Coxswain and the Water Policy. It did contain substantial evidence dating to the Sailors Home phase, the period lease represented in the fabric of the building today. Such well stratified deposits from this type of site in Sydney, which have the potential to preserve organic material in water-logged soil, are very rare. The reclaimed land in front of the building is likely to be the only location where evidence of the Sailors Home period survives and the deposits must be considered of high significance given the lack of historical and architectural evidence for this third phase of occupation.

Investigation within the building revealed a series of drainage works and a sewerage system in the southern room with some deposits which pre-dated its construction. Theses are also of high significance as the only surviving archaeological evidence within the loser floor of the building – the remainder presumably being destroyed during the 1972 works. Evidence on the internal western and northern walls is also significant because it provides a record of the use of this space from 1816 to the present, which is not historically documented. The upper floor of the building also has the potential to provide information unavailable from historical sources about the use of these rooms and the impact of the 1972 work on the surviving fabric.

== See also ==
- Australian residential architectural styles
