= List of caves in Western Australia =

This is a list of caves, and other karst features, in Western Australia. It includes all named features that occur in the Australian Speleological Federation Karst Index Database (KID). The term "karst feature" is an umbrella term for topographical features formed from the dissolution of soluble rocks such as limestone, dolomite, and gypsum. While the majority of features in the list below refer to cave entrances, some other features include cliffs, gorges and a calcified wooden water wheel.

== Karst features ==
Each feature is given a unique identification number, and many are also given a name. This list is restricted to named features. For conservation reasons, the precise locations of features are not made available to the public. However, most features are allocated to an area.

The list shows karst features (e.g. a cave entrance), not cave systems, so caves with two or more entrance points will appear multiple times in the list.

Cave number	Cave name	Cave area
6AU-1	Deepdene Cave	Augusta
6AU-2	Bone Cave	Augusta
6AU-3	Bottomless Hole	Augusta
6AU-6	Harleys Cave	Augusta
6AU-8	Skull Cave	Augusta
6AU-9	Old Kudardup Cave	Augusta
6AU-11	Moondyne Cave	Augusta
6AU-13	Augusta Jewel Cave	Augusta
6AU-14	Easter Cave (Western Australia)	Augusta
6AU-15	Deeondeeup Cave	Augusta
6AU-16	The Labyrinth (Western Australia)	Augusta
6AU-18	Leeuwin Cave	Augusta
6AU-20	Lloyds Dig	Augusta
6AU-22	Deepdene Cliffs - Upper Level	Augusta
6AU-23	Deepdene Cliffs - Lower Level	Augusta
6AU-26	Leeuwin Water Wheel Spring	Augusta
6AU-28	Foundation Cave	Augusta
6AU-29	Clematis Cave	Augusta
6AU-30	Jims Dig	Augusta
6C-4	Owl Roost	Cape Range
6C-12	Petrogale	Cape Range
6C-17	Goat Cave	Cape Range
6C-18	Dry Swallet Cave	Cape Range
6C-21	Monajee Cave	Cape Range
6C-23	Dozer Cave	Cape Range
6C-24	Milyering Well	Cape Range
6C-25	Kudamurra Well	Cape Range
6C-26	Tantabiddi Well	Cape Range
6C-27	Kubura Well	Cape Range
6C-28	Bundera Sinkhole	Cape Range
6C-29	Bell Cave	Cape Range
6C-41	Beanstalk Cave	Cape Range
6C-64	Shot Hole Tunnel	Cape Range
6C-66	Tetra-Dome Cave	Cape Range
6C-67	Oh Well	Cape Range
6C-69	Linda's Delight	Cape Range
6C-76	Papillon Cave	Cape Range
6CO-1	Quinninup Lake Cave	Cowaramup
6CO-5	Guthrie Cave	Cowaramup
6CO-6	Snake Pit	Cowaramup
6CO-7	Cowaramup Cave	Cowaramup
6CO-8	Meekadorabee Cave	Cowaramup
6CO-10	Trichosurus Hole	Cowaramup
6E-1	Stockyard Tunnel	Eneabba
6E-2	Stockyard Bridge	Eneabba
6E-3	Stockyard Cave	Eneabba
6E-4	Alpha Doline	Eneabba
6E-5	Beta Doline	Eneabba
6E-6	Gamma Doline	Eneabba
6E-7	Delta Doline	Eneabba
6E-8	Epsilon Doline	Eneabba
6E-9	Aiyennu Cave	Eneabba
6E-10	Beekeepers Cave	Eneabba
6E-11	Emu Cave	Eneabba
6E-12	Facts of Life Cave	Eneabba
6E-13	Little Three Springs East Cave	Eneabba
6E-14	Little Three Springs West Cave	Eneabba
6E-15	Delta Half Doline	Eneabba
6E-16	Flatworm Cave	Eneabba
6E-17	Zamia Palm Doline	Eneabba
6E-22	Arramal Cave	Eneabba
6E-23	River Cave	Eneabba
6E-24	Weelawadji Cave	Eneabba
6E-25	Honey Cave	Eneabba
6E-26	Lake Erindoon Cave	Eneabba
6E-30	Drip Cave	Eneabba
6E-32	Arramal Cave	Eneabba
6E-45	Red Brush Cave	Eneabba
6E-48	Sponge Cave	Eneabba
6E-49	Rat Cave	Eneabba
6E-50	Weelawadji Cave	Eneabba
6E-52	Weelawadji West	Eneabba
6E-53	Swallow Cave	Eneabba
6E-54	Syg Cave	Eneabba
6E-55	Fishermans Pot	Eneabba
6E-56	Wait Cave	Eneabba
6EM-17	Caladenia Cave	East Moore
6J-1	Gooseberry Cave	Jurien
6J-2	Drovers Cave	Jurien
6J-3	Moorba Cave	Jurien
6J-4	Hastings Cave	Jurien
6J-5	Kjeldahl Cave	Jurien
6J-6	Mystery Cave	Jurien
6J-7	Old River Cave	Jurien
6J-8	Green Head Road Cave	Jurien
6J-9	Retreat Cave	Jurien
6J-10	Tumbled in Cave	Jurien
6J-11	Rifle Cave	Jurien
6 kg-1	Geikie Gorge	Kimberleys – Geike Area
6 kg-2	Geikie Bat Cave	Kimberleys – Geike Area
6 kg-3	Homestead South Cave	Kimberleys – Geike Area
6 kg-4	Homestead South Cave	Kimberleys – Geike Area
6 kg-5	Homestead South Cave	Kimberleys – Geike Area
6 kg-6	Homestead North Cave	Kimberleys – Geike Area
6 kg-7	Homestead North Cave	Kimberleys – Geike Area
6KH-1	Siphon Spring	Kimberleys – Horse Spring Range/Hull Range Area
6KH-2	Horse Spring	Kimberleys – Horse Spring Range/Hull Range Area
6KL-1	Cave Springs	Kimberleys – Lawford/Laidlaw Area
6KL-3	Cave Springs	Kimberleys – Lawford/Laidlaw Area
6KL-4	Network Cave	Kimberleys – Lawford/Laidlaw Area
6KL-5	Mimbi Cave (Upper)	Kimberleys – Lawford/Laidlaw Area
6KL-6	Nardji Cave	Kimberleys – Lawford/Laidlaw Area
6KL-7	Nardji Cave	Kimberleys – Lawford/Laidlaw Area
6KL-8	Nardji Cave	Kimberleys – Lawford/Laidlaw Area
6KL-9	Galeru Gorge	Kimberleys – Lawford/Laidlaw Area
6KL-10	Kudata Gap	Kimberleys – Lawford/Laidlaw Area
6KL-11	Pluto's Way	Kimberleys – Lawford/Laidlaw Area
6KL-12	Pluto's Way	Kimberleys – Lawford/Laidlaw Area
6KL-13	Pluto's Way	Kimberleys – Lawford/Laidlaw Area
6KL-14	Pluto's Way	Kimberleys – Lawford/Laidlaw Area
6KL-15	Pluto's Way	Kimberleys – Lawford/Laidlaw Area
6KL-16	Illawarra Cave	Kimberleys – Lawford/Laidlaw Area
6KN-1	Old Napier Downs Cave	Kimberleys – Napier Range Area
6KN-2	Wangahinnya Caves	Kimberleys – Napier Range Area
6KN-3	Barnet Spring Cave	Kimberleys – Napier Range Area
6KN-4	Barnet Spring Cave	Kimberleys – Napier Range Area
6KN-5	Window Cave	Kimberleys – Napier Range Area
6KN-6	Window Cave	Kimberleys – Napier Range Area
6KN-7	Pigeons Cave	Kimberleys – Napier Range Area
6KN-8	Bull Cave	Kimberleys – Napier Range Area
6KN-9	Barnet Spring Gorge	Kimberleys – Napier Range Area
6KN-10	Old Napier Downs Polje	Kimberleys – Napier Range Area
6KN-11	Windjana Gorge	Kimberleys – Napier Range Area
6KN-13	Westernmost Cave	Kimberleys – Napier Range Area
6KN-14	Westernmost Cave	Kimberleys – Napier Range Area
6KO-1	The Tunnel	Kimberleys – Oscar Range Area
6KO-2	The Tunnel	Kimberleys – Oscar Range Area
6KO-3	The Tunnel	Kimberleys – Oscar Range Area
6KO-5	Dingo Gap	Kimberleys – Oscar Range Area
6KO-6	Dingo Gap Cave	Kimberleys – Oscar Range Area
6KO-7	Brooking Yard	Kimberleys – Oscar Range Area
6KO-8	Brooking Gorge	Kimberleys – Oscar Range Area
6KO-9	Wine Spring	Kimberleys – Oscar Range Area
6KO-10	Pink Trigger Spring	Kimberleys – Oscar Range Area
6KO-11	Supine Spring	Kimberleys – Oscar Range Area
6KO-12	Elimberrie Spring	Kimberleys – Oscar Range Area
6KO-14	Fig Spring	Kimberleys – Oscar Range Area
6KO-16	Palm Spring	Kimberleys – Oscar Range Area
6KP-1	Menyous Gap	Kimberleys – Pillara Range Area
6KP-2	Menyous Gap Cave	Kimberleys – Pillara Range Area
6KP-3	Knock-On-Wood Cave	Kimberleys – Pillara Range Area
6KP-4	Knock-On-Wood Cave	Kimberleys – Pillara Range Area
6KP-5	Knock-On-Wood Cave	Kimberleys – Pillara Range Area
6LW-1	Avalon Cave	Lower West Coast
6LW-2	Dawes Cave	Lower West Coast
6LW-3	Toussant Cave	Lower West Coast
6LW-4	Morfitt Cave No. 1	Lower West Coast
6LW-5	Morfitt Cave No. 2	Lower West Coast
6LW-6	Kwinana Cave	Lower West Coast
6LW-7	Kings Park Cave	Lower West Coast
6LW-8	Blackwall Reach Caves	Lower West Coast
6LW-9	Blackwall Reach Caves	Lower West Coast
6LW-10	Blackwall Reach Caves	Lower West Coast
6LW-11	Peppermint Grove Cave	Lower West Coast
6LW-12	Two Up Cave	Lower West Coast
6LW-16	Dock Cave	Lower West Coast
6LW-17	Naval Base Hotel Cave	Lower West Coast
6LW-18	Point Peron Cave	Lower West Coast
6LW-19	Tomich Cave	Lower West Coast
6LW-20	Soltoggia Cave	Lower West Coast
6LW-25	Prisoners Cave	Lower West Coast
6M-1	Coorow Cave	Moora
6M-6	Jingemia Cave	Moora
6M-7	Bishops Hole	Moora
6MIS-4	Dale Cave	
6MIS-5	Frieze Cave	
6MIS-6	Bates Cave	
6MIS-7	Hippo's Yawn	
6MIS-8	Willagulli Caves	
6MIS-9	Appertarra Cave	
6MIS-11	Sandspring Rockshelter	
6MIS-14	Carved Cave Spring	
6MIS-15	Mujingerra Cave	
6MIS-16	Empress Spring	
6MIS-17	Helena Spring	
6MIS-18	Prideaux Cave	
6MIS-20	Albert Caves	
6MIS-21	Chittering Cave	
6MIS-22	Hole-In-The-Wall Cave	
6MIS-23	The Caves	
6MIS-24	Nanga Caves	
6MIS-26	Stoneaxe Cave	
6MIS-27	Crane Cave	
6MIS-28	Pine Tree Cave	
6MIS-29	Bats Cave	
6MIS-34	Wilgie Mia Ochre Mine	
6MIS-35	Barnes Rock Cave	
6MIS-36	Bee Gorge Cave	
6MIS-37	Campfire Cave	
6MIS-38	Arches Cave	
6MR-1	Witchcliffe Cave	Margaret River
6MR-2	Blackboy Hollow Cave	Margaret River
6MR-3	Rainbow Cave (Western Australia)	Margaret River
6MR-4	Wallcliffe Cave	Margaret River
6MR-9	Foxhole Cave	Margaret River
6MR-19	Milligans Cave	Margaret River
6N-2	Weebubbie Cave	Nullarbor Plain
6N-3	Abrakurrie Cave	Nullarbor Plain
6N-17	Chowilla Landslip	Nullarbor Plain
6N-19	Weebubbie Road Blowhole	Nullarbor Plain
6N-34	Water Truck Blowhole	Nullarbor Plain
6N-35	Bobobogol Doline	Nullarbor Plain
6N-36	Erosion Blowhole	Nullarbor Plain
6N-37	Mullamullang Cave	Nullarbor Plain
6N-38	Walpet Cave	Nullarbor Plain
6N-39	Joe's Cave	Nullarbor Plain
6N-40	Kestrel No. 1 Cavern	Nullarbor Plain
6N-41	Spider Sink	Nullarbor Plain
6N-42	Kestrel No. 2 Cavern	Nullarbor Plain
6N-43	Parritappa Doline	Nullarbor Plain
6N-44	Kutowalla Doline	Nullarbor Plain
6N-45	Winbirra Cave	Nullarbor Plain
6N-46	Nurina Cave	Nullarbor Plain
6N-47	Murra-El-Elevyn Cave	Nullarbor Plain
6N-48	Cocklebiddy Cave	Nullarbor Plain
6N-49	Pannikin Plain Cave	Nullarbor Plain
6N-50	Capstan Cave	Nullarbor Plain
6N-51	Gecko Cave	Nullarbor Plain
6N-53	Moonera Tank Cave	Nullarbor Plain
6N-55	Haig Cave	Nullarbor Plain
6N-56	Tommy Grahams Cave	Nullarbor Plain
6N-57	Beerbox Cave	Nullarbor Plain
6N-58	Roaches Rest Cave	Nullarbor Plain
6N-59	Horseshoe Cave	Nullarbor Plain
6N-60	Lynch Cave	Nullarbor Plain
6N-62	Madura Cave	Nullarbor Plain
6N-63	Thylacine Hole	Nullarbor Plain
6N-68	Madura Pass Blowhole	Nullarbor Plain
6N-70	Firestick Cave	Nullarbor Plain
6N-71	Fairy Martin Doline	Nullarbor Plain
6N-73	Camp One Blowhole	Nullarbor Plain
6N-74	Twelfth Cave	Nullarbor Plain
6N-81	Arubiddy Cave	Nullarbor Plain
6N-82	Skink Hole	Nullarbor Plain
6N-83	Old Homestead Cave	Nullarbor Plain
6N-84	Decoration Cave	Nullarbor Plain
6N-132	Webb's Cave	Nullarbor Plain
6N-133	Snake Pit	Nullarbor Plain
6N-157	Twin Level Cave	Nullarbor Plain
6N-159	Telegraph Cave	Nullarbor Plain
6N-160	Dingo Cave	Nullarbor Plain
6N-164	Caiguna Rockhole Cave	Nullarbor Plain
6N-165	Kelly Cave	Nullarbor Plain
6N-166	Squeeze Blowhole	Nullarbor Plain
6N-167	Cairn Blowhole	Nullarbor Plain
6N-168	Bottle Pot	Nullarbor Plain
6N-169	Double Blowhole (East)	Nullarbor Plain
6N-170	Double Blowhole (West)	Nullarbor Plain
6N-191	Offset Blowhole	Nullarbor Plain
6N-192	Native Cave	Nullarbor Plain
6N-193	Witches Cave	Nullarbor Plain
6N-194	Philistine Flattener	Nullarbor Plain
6N-196	Rest Area Blowhole	Nullarbor Plain
6N-198	Station Track Blowhole	Nullarbor Plain
6N-200	Petrogale Cave	Nullarbor Plain
6N-202	Baxter West Blowhole No. 1	Nullarbor Plain
6N-203	Baxter West Blowhole No. 2	Nullarbor Plain
6N-204	Baxter West Blowhole No. 3	Nullarbor Plain
6N-206	Thampanna Cave	Nullarbor Plain
6N-218	Random Camp Blowhole	Nullarbor Plain
6N-220	Dead Horse Cave	Nullarbor Plain
6N-221	Mallee Blowhole	Nullarbor Plain
6S-1	Christmas Island Guano Cave No. 1	South Coast
6S-2	Christmas Island Guano Cave No. 2	South Coast
6S-3	Christmas Island Guano Cave No. 3	South Coast
6S-4	Duke of Orleans Bay Cave	South Coast
6S-5	Frenchmans Peak Tunnel	South Coast
6S-6	Point Hood Blowhole	South Coast
6S-7	Mount Le Grande Cave No. 1	South Coast
6S-8	Mount Le Grande Cave No. 2	South Coast
6S-9	Mount Le Grande Cave No. 3	South Coast
6S-12	Dempsters Head Cave	South Coast
6S-16	Windy Harbour Cave	South Coast
6S-17	Inland Cliffs Cave	South Coast
6S-18	Malimup Spring Cave	South Coast
6S-23	Cape Beaufort Cave	South Coast
6S-24	Chudelupe Cave	South Coast
6SH-1	Super Cave	South Hill River
6SH-2	Weston Cave	South Hill River
6SH-4	Reptation Cave	South Hill River
6SH-7	Thousand Man Cave	South Hill River
6SH-9	Pretty Cave	South Hill River
6SH-10	Nambang Cave	South Hill River
6SH-11	Army Cave	South Hill River
6SH-12	Quandong Cave	South Hill River
6SH-13	Green Island Cave	South Hill River
6SH-14	Wedges Cave	South Hill River
6SH-15	Taranakite Cave	South Hill River
6SH-17	Brown Bone Cave	South Hill River
6SH-18	Cadda Cave	South Hill River
6SH-20	Tick Cave	South Hill River
6SH-21	Woolka Woolka Well Cave	South Hill River
6SH-23	Princes Cave	South Hill River
6SH-25	Scoop Spring	South Hill River
6SH-29	Ranger Cave	South Hill River
6SH-30	Nambung Spring	South Hill River
6SH-31	Lake Thetis	South Hill River
6SH-35	Verandah Post Cave	South Hill River
6SH-38	Pulchella Cave	South Hill River
6SH-40	Kinenabbra Cave	South Hill River
6SH-42	Strathmore Cave	South Hill River
6SH-45	Scallop Cave	South Hill River
6SH-50	Horse Cave	South Hill River
6SH-51	Echidna Cave	South Hill River
6WI-2	Green Cave	Witchcliffe
6WI-5	Midgie Cave	Witchcliffe
6WI-6	Goanna Cave	Witchcliffe
6WI-7	Skittle Cave	Witchcliffe
6WI-9	Kudjal Yolgah	Witchcliffe
6WI-13	Golgotha Cave	Witchcliffe
6WI-15	Kens Cave	Witchcliffe
6WI-17	Mordang Dar	Witchcliffe
6WI-21	Giants Cave	Witchcliffe
6WI-22	Giants Cave	Witchcliffe
6WI-23	Kangaroo Pot	Witchcliffe
6WI-24	Bride Cave	Witchcliffe
6WI-26	Crustacea Cave	Witchcliffe
6WI-30	Lake Cave	Witchcliffe
6WI-31	Museum Cave	Witchcliffe
6WI-33	Tunnel Cave	Witchcliffe
6WI-37	Orchid Cave	Witchcliffe
6WI-38	Mammoth Cave	Witchcliffe
6WI-42	Terry Cave	Witchcliffe
6WI-43	Terry Cave	Witchcliffe
6WI-44	Conference Cave	Witchcliffe
6WI-47	Terry Cave	Witchcliffe
6WI-48	Connelly Cave	Witchcliffe
6WI-49	Calgardup Cave	Witchcliffe
6WI-51	Rudducks Cave	Witchcliffe
6WI-53	Zamia Nut Cave	Witchcliffe
6WI-54	Breakneck Gully	Witchcliffe
6WI-56	Arumvale Pipe	Witchcliffe
6WI-57	Arumvale Cave	Witchcliffe
6WI-58	Blue Rock Cave	Witchcliffe
6WI-59	Mill Cave	Witchcliffe
6WI-60	Nannup Cave	Witchcliffe
6WI-61	Devil's Lair	Witchcliffe
6WI-62	Crystal Cave	Witchcliffe
6WI-63	Strongs Cave	Witchcliffe
6WI-64	Soil Chute Cave	Witchcliffe
6WI-67	Acoustic Cave	Witchcliffe
6WI-71	Dingo Cave	Witchcliffe
6WI-82	Bobs Hollow Resurgence	Witchcliffe
6WI-87	Swamp Inflow	Witchcliffe
6WI-93	Arnor Cave	Witchcliffe
6WI-97	Tunnel Cave	Witchcliffe
6WI-101	Tight Entrance Cave	Witchcliffe
6YA-1	Ngilgi Cave (formerly Yallingup Cave)	Yallingup
6YA-2	Northcote Grotto	Yallingup
6YA-3	Seven Sisters Cave	Yallingup
6YA-10	Karri Cave	Yallingup
6YA-12	Terrible Cave	Yallingup
6YA-13	Warrigal Cave	Yallingup
6YA-27	Ketalack Cave	Yallingup
6YA-39	Beam Pot	Yallingup
6YA-40	Barbilla Cave	Yallingup
6YA-49	Injidup Doline & Shaft 1	Yallingup
6YA-50	Injidup Doline 2	Yallingup
6YA-51	Lost Pearl Cave	Yallingup
6YN-1	Crystal Cave	Yanchep
6YN-2	Yonderup Cave	Yanchep
6YN-3	Spider Cave (Western Australia)	Yanchep
6YN-4	Kangaroo Cave	Yanchep
6YN-5	Silver Stocking Cabaret Cave	Yanchep
6YN-6	Boomerang Gorge Cave No. 1	Yanchep
6YN-7	Boomerang Gorge Cave No. 2	Yanchep
6YN-8	Road Cave	Yanchep
6YN-9	Cauliflower Cave	Yanchep
6YN-11	Water Cave	Yanchep
6YN-12	Mambibby Cave	Yanchep
6YN-13	Loch Overflow Cave	Yanchep
6YN-14	White Grotto	Yanchep
6YN-16	Yanchep Cave	Yanchep
6YN-19	Pop Hole Cave	Yanchep
6YN-20	Surprise Cave	Yanchep
6YN-21	Marble Terrace Cave	Yanchep
6YN-22	Rose Cave	Yanchep
6YN-24	Wilgarup Cave	Yanchep
6YN-26	Census Cave	Yanchep
6YN-28	Minnies Grotto	Yanchep
6YN-32	Ornamental Lake Spring	Yanchep
6YN-39	Bluff Cave	Yanchep
6YN-42	Loch McNess Power Station Spring	Yanchep
6YN-51	Bettong Cave	Yanchep
6YN-52	Thylacine Cave	Yanchep
6YN-53	Sarcophilus Cave	Yanchep
6YN-67	Dead Cow Cave	Yanchep
6YN-69	Flynn's Cave	Yanchep
6YN-92	Zenal's Cave	Yanchep
6YN-94	Invasion Cave	Yanchep
6YN-100	Kiln Spring	Yanchep
6YN-102	Quinns Rocks Spring	Yanchep
6YN-108	Wilgarup Collapse	Yanchep
6YN-115	Tuart Cleft	Yanchep
6YN-116	Cat Skull Cave	Yanchep
6YN-118	Koala Cave	Yanchep
6YN-125	Dibbler Cave	Yanchep
6YN-126	Melaleuca Cave	Yanchep
6YN-130	Orchestra Shell Cave	Yanchep
6YN-140	Gibb Cave	Yanchep

== See also ==
- List of caves in Australia
