= Moondyne (disambiguation) =

Moondyne is a novel written in 1879 by John Boyle O'Reilly, and later made into a feature film of the same name.

Moondyne can also refer to:

- Moondyne Joe (Joseph Johns, c. 1826–1900), a bushranger from Western Australia
- Moondyne Cave, a cave in the south-west of Western Australia near Augusta discovered and used by Johns
- Moondyne Nature Reserve, a land reserve within the Avon Valley National Park, about 20 km west of Toodyay, Western Australia
