= Niggly Cave =

Cave in Tasmania, Australia

- Country: Australia
- State: Tasmania
- LGA: Derwent Valley Council
- Location: 87 km (54 mi) W of Hobart; 52 km (32 mi) W of New Norfolk

Government
  - State electorate: Lyons
  - Federal division: Lyons
- Postcode: 7140
- Mean max temp: 16.1 °C (61.0 °F)
- Mean min temp: 5.2 °C (41.4 °F)
- Annual rainfall: 1,201.5 mm (47.30 in)

Niggly/Growling Swallet cave system (JF-237), Tasmania is the deepest cave in Australia.

Part of the extensive Junee-Florentine karst area near Mt Field National Park, it was considered to be the deepest explored cave in Australia since being discovered in 1994 until it was connected to and technically absorbed by the Growling Swallet (JF-36) system in 2019, bringing the depth record to 397m. The nearby Delta Variant Cave (JF-761) is expected to join the Niggly Cave/Growling Swallet system and push the depth record just over 400m in mid to late 2022. Recent exploration has been carried out by the Southern Tasmanian Caverneers - other deep caves they have explored nearby include Tachycardia Cave (JF-270).

The entrance to Niggly Cave is somewhat uninspiring, immediately dropping down a tight vertical shaft, and interspersing tight horizontal passages with large and spectacular drops, the longest being 183m. After 250m of abseiling and squeezing, a large underground river is reached, supplied in part by Growling Swallet, and emerging some 5km away. All of the cave is very technical alpine caving; there are no commercial tours.

Niggly Cave drains to the Junee River, in the Junee Cave State Reserve, adjacent to the Mount Field National Park in Tasmania, Australia. The nearest town is Maydena. The estimated terrain elevation above sea level is 800 metres and the local geology is permo-Triassic sediment. The area is covered with thick sclerophyll forest.

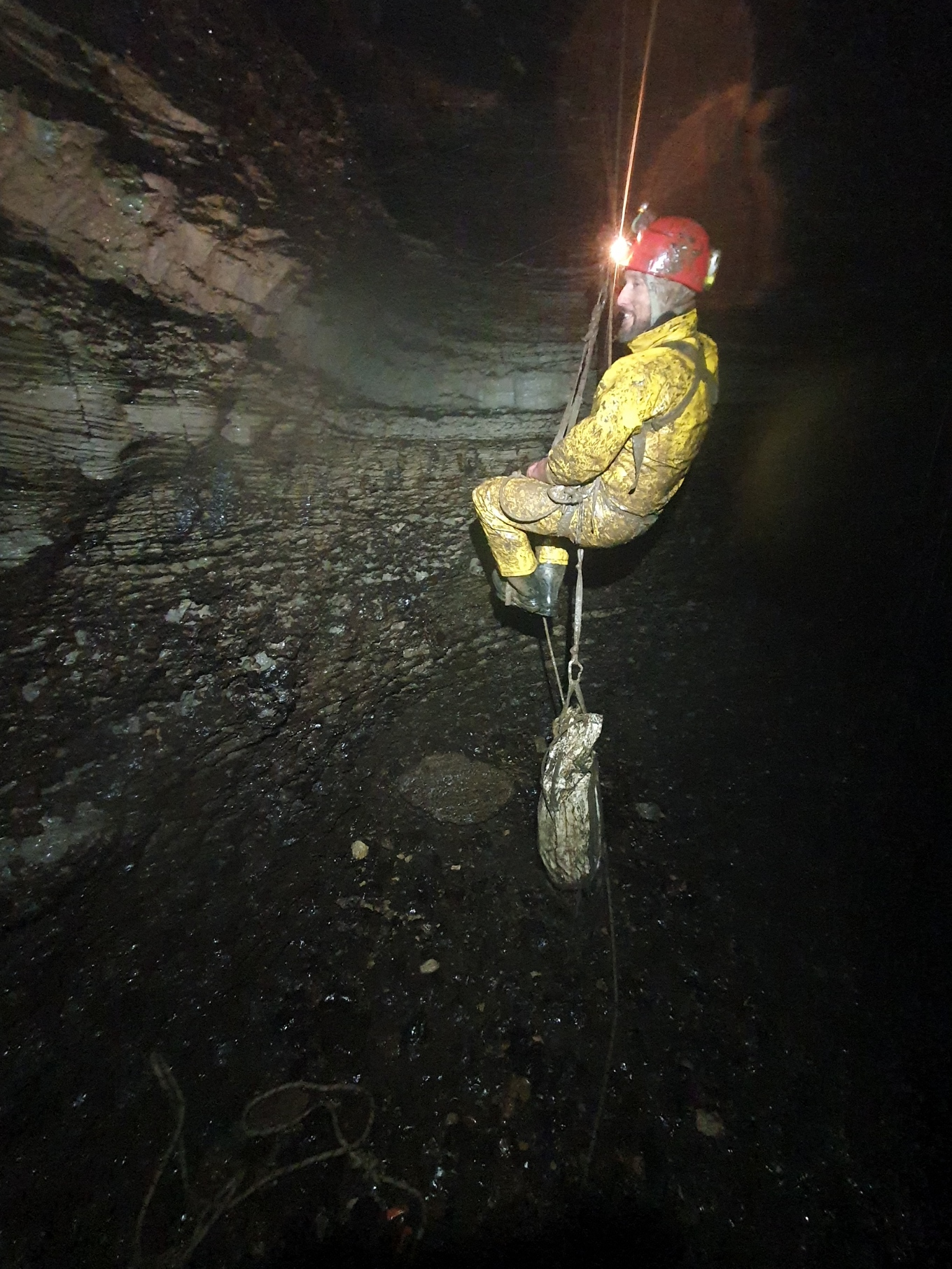
Cave explorer in Niggly Cave

== See also ==
- Ngilgi Cave
- List of caves in Australia
