= Ngilgi Cave =

Cave in Western Australia

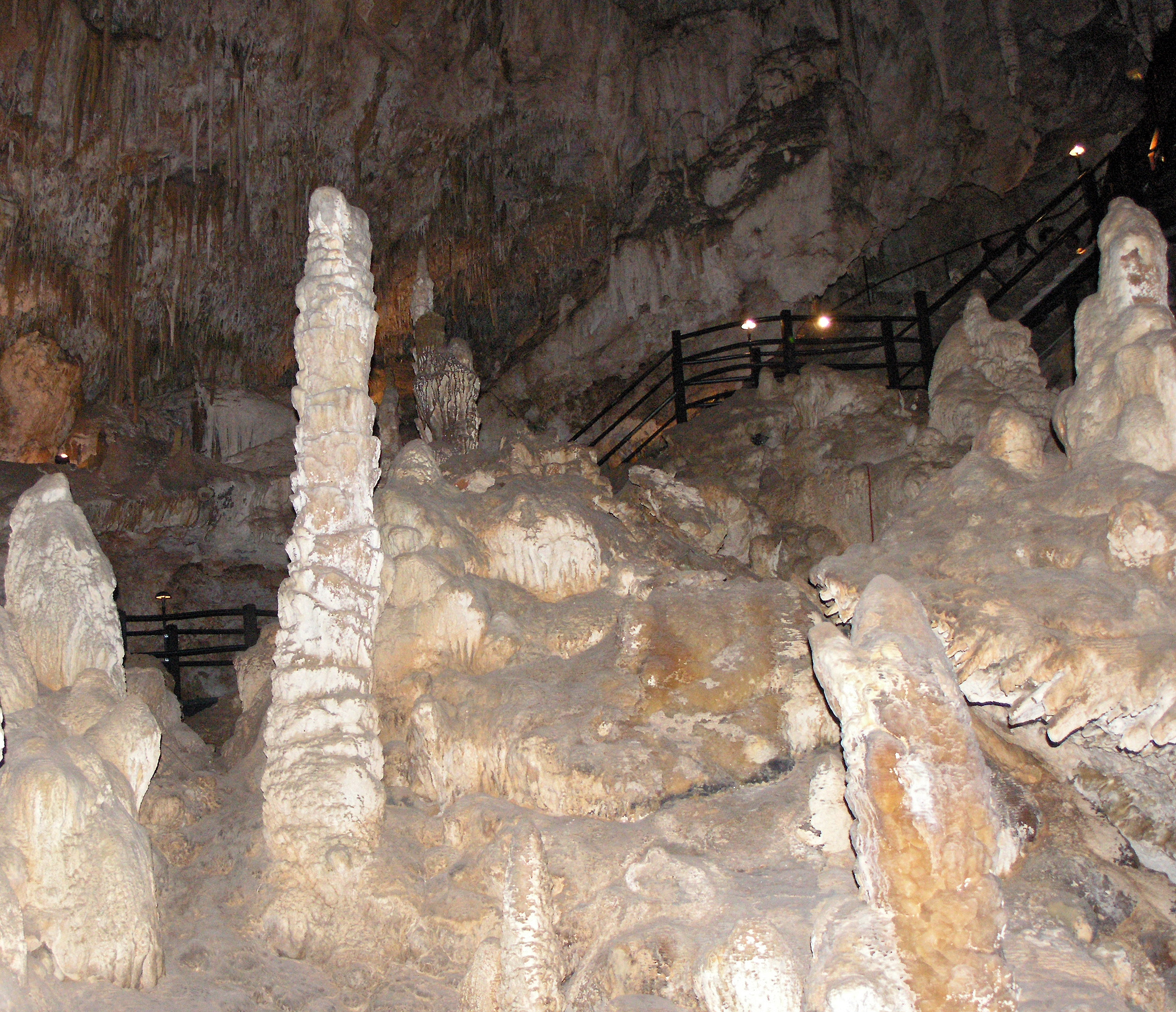
- Inside Ngilgi Cave
- Interactive map of Ngilgi Cave
- Location: Yallingup, Western Australia
- Coordinates: 33°38′32″S 115°02′03″E
- Depth: 39 m (128 ft)
- Length: 730 m (2,400 ft)
- Discovery: 10 October 1899 (European)
- Geology: Karst cave
- Access: Open daily for self-guided tours
- Registry: 6YA-1

Ngilgi Cave, previously known as Yallingup Cave, is a karst cave to the northeast of Yallingup, in the southwest of Western Australia.

In many sections of the cave a red layer of soil can be seen; this is called paleosol.

== Discovery ==
The local Wardandi people have long known of the existence of the Ngilgi cave. The Wardandi believe the caves to be their passage to the afterlife.

Edward Dawson was the first European to enter the cave when he went searching for stray horses in 1899. He acted as a guide to the cave from December 1900 to November 1937.

It was frequently promoted and was highlighted in early twentieth century tourism promotion materials.

In 1963 there were two record-breaking cave "sit ins" by Wyndham Rendell (87 days) and Dorothy Williams (90 days).

=== 1963 cave sit ===
Williams from a 1963 issue of Australian Women's Weekly

Dorothy Williams (1928 – ?) held the "world's endurance record for time spent alone beneath the earth's surface", after living in Ngilgi Cave for 90 days in 1963. She was the first woman to set a "lone cave sitting" record. While in the cave she discovered several fossils that had not previously been found in Western Australia.

At the time of her record-breaking cave sit Williams was living in Victoria Park, Perth. Her jobs up until that point had included hairdresser, shearers' cook and teashop owner.

While talking with friends about Wyndham Rendell's recent record-breaking 87-days spent in Ngilgi Cave, Williams was dared to beat it. Upon accepting the challenge, she travelled to Yallingup and began her sit on 30 May 1963. Williams set up in a "corner" of the cave, with a table, chair and bed. She cooked breakfast on a small oil stove and had all other meals and drinking water passed down to her from a local hotel.

She left the cave on 28 August 1963, having beaten Wyndham Rendell's record by three days. Of her feat she said, "I have proved that women can endure solitude as much as men. I would have stayed down another three months were it necessary to break the record." She was greeted by about 200 people when she left the cave.

Her record was broken on 30 September by Jeffrey Workman, an English potholer, who spent 105 days in Stump Cross Caverns, Yorkshire.

==== Discoveries ====
At the request of Western Australian Museum, Williams dug in the sandy areas of the cave and discovered many bones, including the skeleton of a seven-foot-tall megafauna kangaroo, a Tasmanian tiger and several other "rare marsupials" which were not known to have existed in Western Australia until that point. Her research and finds, including 20 bags of fossils, were donated to the museum. She also befriended four cave-dwelling possums and wrote a paper on their habits, which she also gave to the museum.

== Naming ==
It was originally named for the nearby town of Yallingup but renamed in 2000 to acknowledge the cave's part in Australian Aboriginal mythology. Ngilgi (pronounced Neelgee) was a good spirit who triumphed in battle against an evil spirit Wolgine.

The story is part of the heritage of the Wardandi people who are the custodians of the caves in the area.

== See also ==
- Niggly Cave, Tasmania
- List of caves in Australia
- List of caves in Western Australia

== Gallery ==
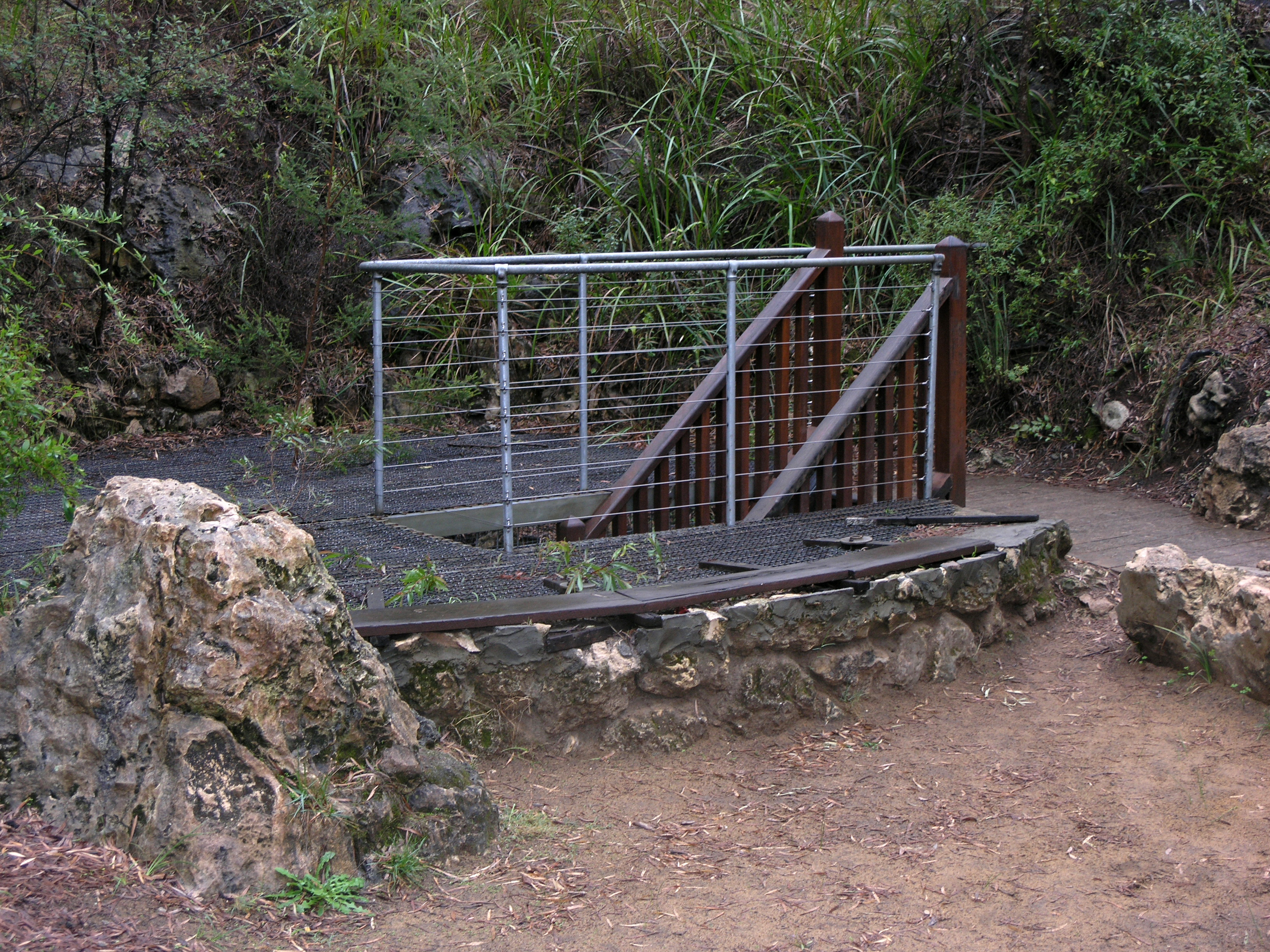
Entrance to Ngilgi Cave

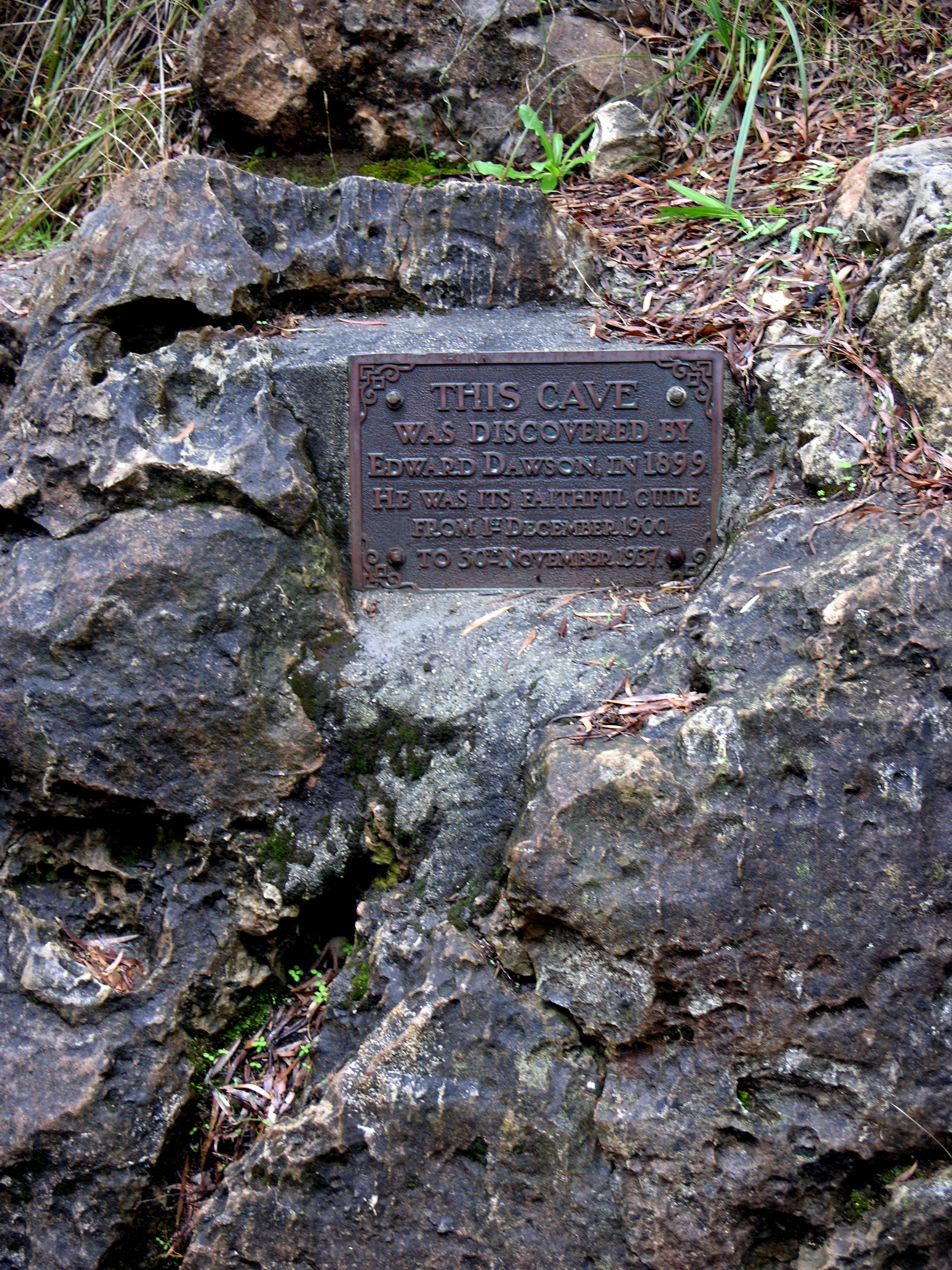
Plaque commemorating the discovery

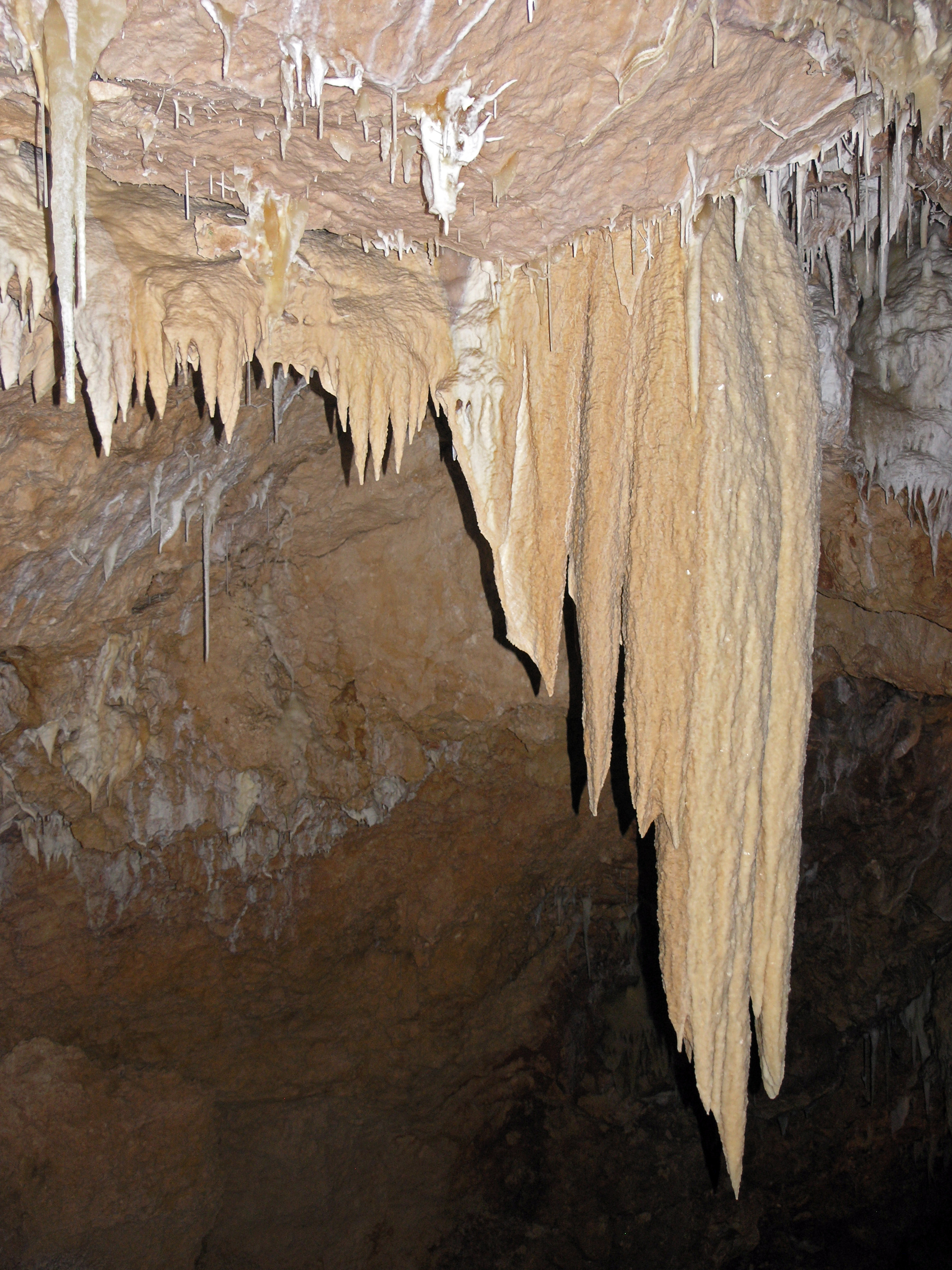
"Two Tonne Stalactite"

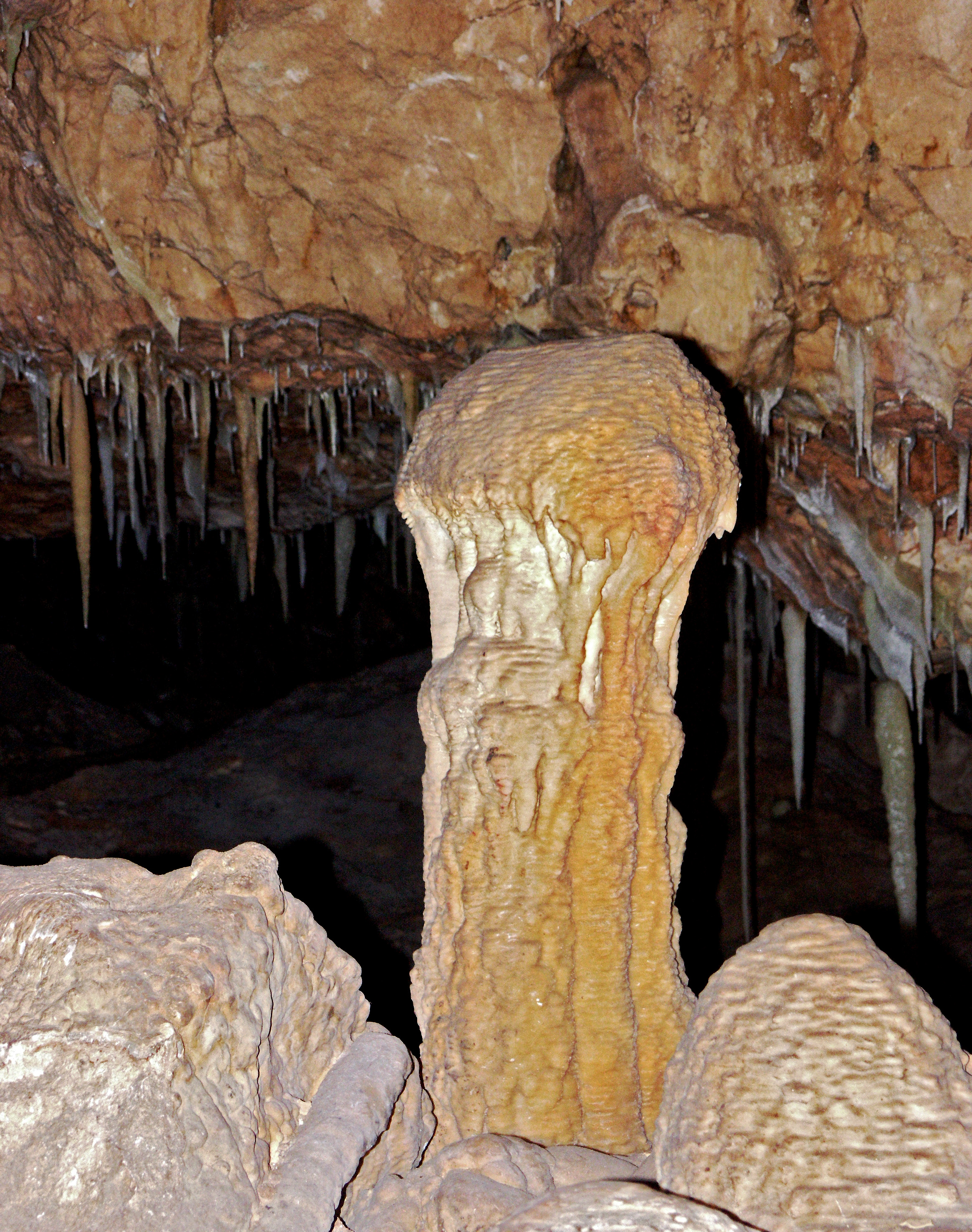
Rock formation
