= John Williams (convict) =

John Williams was a convict transported to Van Diemen's Land (now Tasmania). He is best known as the man with whom Joseph Johns, later to become the bushranger Moondyne Joe, was arrested and tried for burglary.

Originally from Horsley, Gloucester, Williams was working as a canal boatman on the Brecon to Monmouth in Wales under the pseudonym William Cross when he and Johns were arrested on 15 November 1848 near Chepstow for "... illegally entering the premises of Mr Richard Price, Esquire, of Pentwyn Clydach... and from there taking three loaves of bread, one piece of bacon, several cheeses, a kettle and a quantity of salt". Arraigned at the Brecon Assizes on charges of burglary and stealing, the pair pleaded not guilty. On 23 March they were tried at the Lent Assizes before Sir William Erle. Newspaper reports of the trial suggest that the pair gave an unexpectedly spirited defence, but Johns was abrasive and "contravened the conventions of court procedure". The men were convicted and sentenced to ten years' penal servitude. Edgar (1990) observes that in several other cases brought before the same judge that day, guilty pleas to very similar charges resulted in sentences ranging from three weeks to three months.

Williams and Johns would have spent the next seven months working on a government work party in the local area, before being transferred to Millbank Prison. On 1 January 1850, they were transferred to Pentonville Prison to serve their mandatory six months of solitary confinement. The pair were transferred to Dartmoor Prison on 21 October 1851, but shortly afterwards Johns was transferred to a Woolwich prison hulk for disciplinary reasons. Williams remained at Dartmoor until March 1852, when he boarded the Fairlie for transportation to Van Diemen's Land.

The Fairlie arrived in Hobart on 4 July. Issued with a ticket of leave, Williams absconded several times, and had his ticket revoked on a number of occasions. On one occasion he received six months hard labour for being "upon the female premises without authority and holding communication with a female servant". He was awarded a conditional pardon on 11 December 1855 but it must have been revoked because another was later awarded to him. On 18 July 1859 he received his full pardon. No trace of his subsequent life has been found.
