= Capricorn Caves =

Cave system in Queensland, Australia

Coordinates: 23°10′02.40″S 150°29′27.63″E

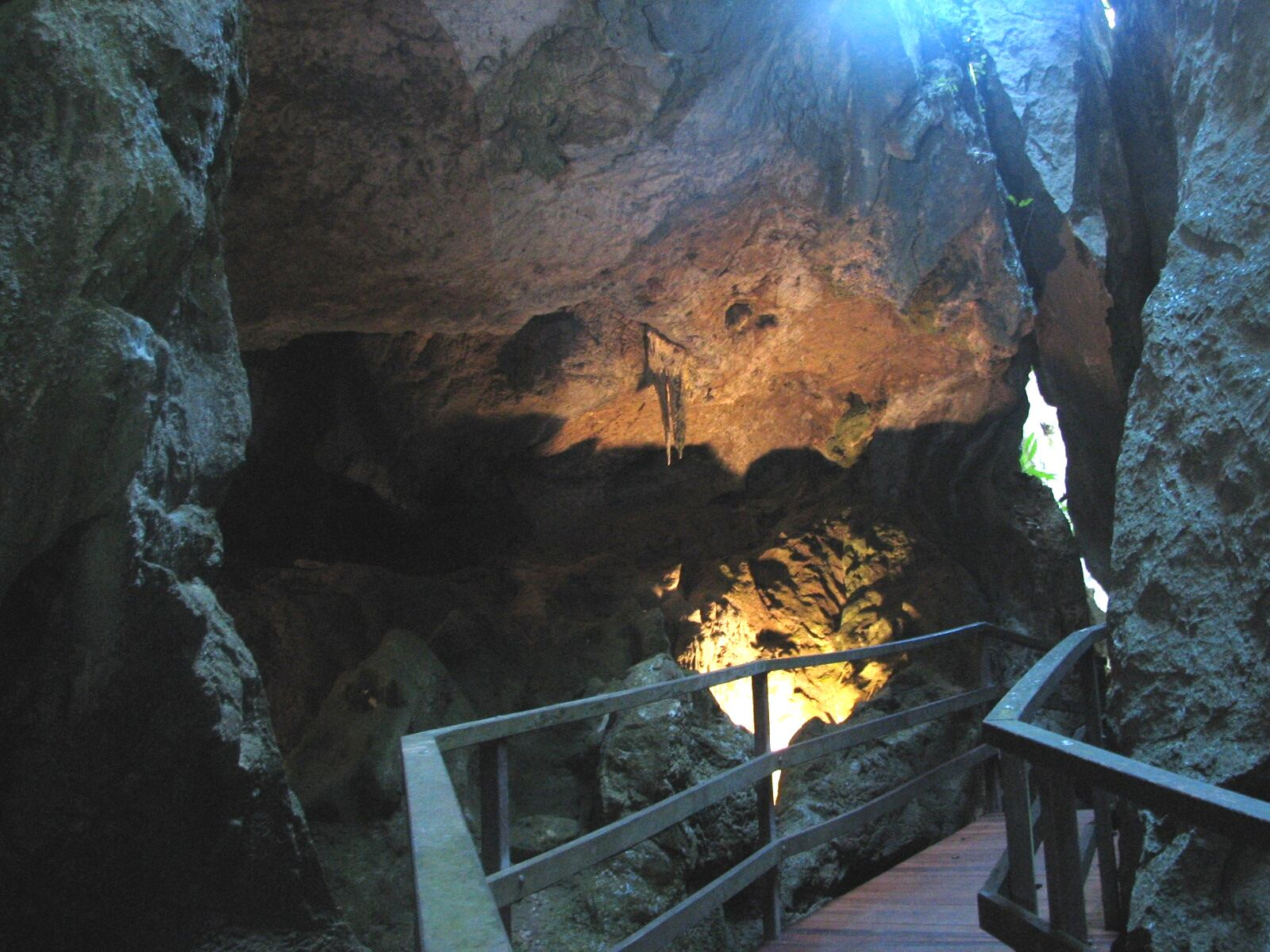
- Interactive map of Capricorn Caves
- Location: Rockhampton, Queensland, Australia
- Discovery: 1882 by John Olsen
- Geology: Limestone
- Website: www.capricorncaves.com.au

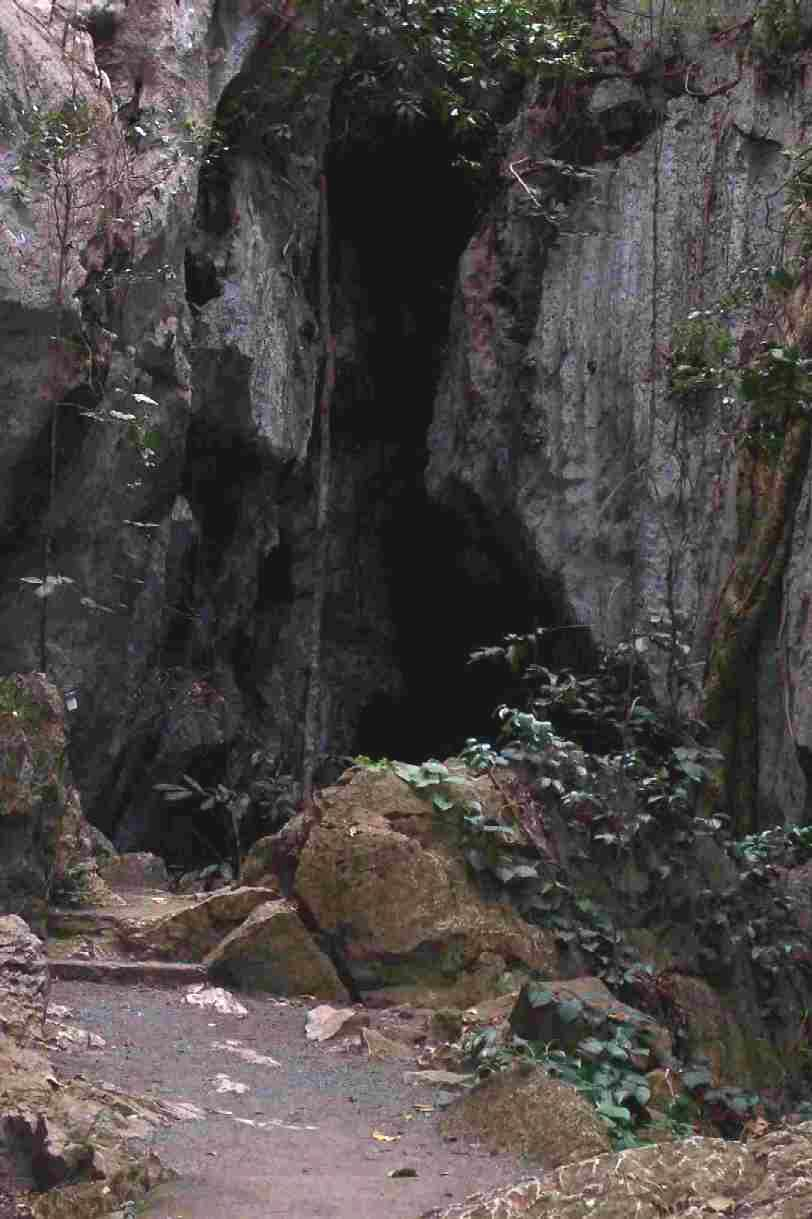
Entrance to Capricorn Caves

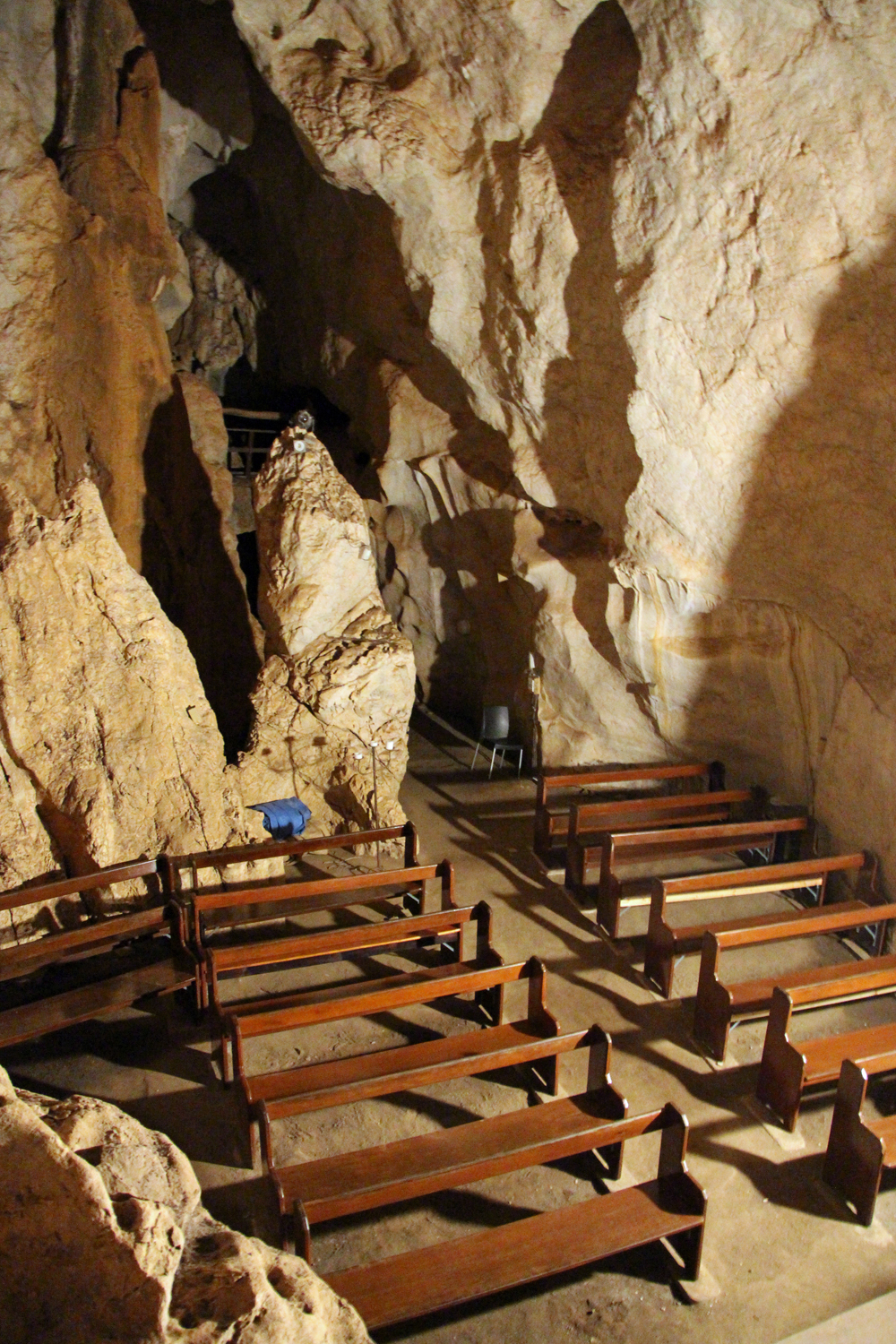
Cathedral Cave (Capricorn Caves)

Capricorn Caves are located 23 kilometres (14 mi) north of Rockhampton, Queensland, Australia. The limestone caves are one of the largest privately owned cave systems in Australia.

== History ==
It was first discovered in 1881 by Norwegian migrant John Olsen. He went on to claim the land under a lease hold title and open the attraction publicly in 1884. The property was later reclassified to free hold land and is today one of the largest privately owned cave systems in Australia. The attraction is open to the public and is one of the longest-running tourist attractions in Queensland. The Caves were made from limestone which were developed from corals from millions of years ago.

== Access ==
During certain seasons visitors may see insectivorous bats in the caves.

Abseiling, rock climbing, fossicking and animal viewing can be experienced at the 33 hectare property. An adventure course features a climbing wall and rope obstacle. A range of accommodation facilities are available to visitors. The complex contains a geo-discovery building which is used for school education programs in biology, geology and environmental studies.

== Tours ==
The tours are run hourly from 9 am till 4 pm with adventure tours run with advance bookings. The Cathedral Tour lasts for one hour and consists of a 1 kilometre (0.62 mi) walk through the caves with an adventure option at the end negotiating your way through a narrow, zigzag water-formed passageway by candlelight, fairy lights or torch.

The Cathedral Cave Tour allows for wheelchair access. The Cathedral Chamber features excellent natural acoustics and is used for weddings.

== Origins ==
The caves developed in limestone which was formed from corals growing in shallow waters around volcanic islands. After becoming exposed on land, the limestone was dissolved by acidic rain and underground water.

== Awards ==
The caves received advanced ecotourism certification in 1997. In 2005, the caves received awards in the Adventure tourism and Best Marketing categories at the Queensland Tourism Awards. In both 2008 and 2009, the Capricorn Caves won the Steve Irwin Ecotourism Award.

== See also ==
- List of caves in Australia
