= Old Homestead Cave =

Cave in Western Australia

Coordinates: 31°09′12″S 127°57′33″E

Old Homestead Cave is a wild cave on the Nullarbor Plain in Western Australia. It was, at one point, the longest explored cave in Australia following a three-week-long expedition in 1990. Although it has long since lost this title it still stands at an impressive 36 km long.

Originally named after a homestead that was built near its entrance. The ultimate failure of the homesteaders to find water in the cave spelt the end to the homestead but their efforts can still be seen in the cave entrance.

Access to the cave is via an enormous sinkhole that allows access to both Northern and Southern sections although the Northern half is substantially longer.

Unlike many of the caves on the Nullarbor Plain which can have very large chambers, Old Homestead Cave is made up of a maze of smaller passages.

== See also ==
- List of caves in Australia
