= Moondyne Joe =

Western Australian bushranger (d. 1900)

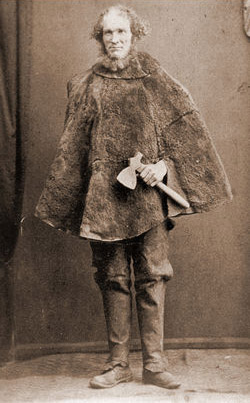
- Moondyne Joe
- Born: Joseph Bolitho Johns c. February 1826; Cornwall, England, UK
- Died: 13 August 1900 (aged 74); Fremantle, Western Australia, British Empire
- Resting place: Fremantle Cemetery, Fremantle, Western Australia
- Occupations: Miner, Bushranger
- Spouse: Louisa Frances Elizabeth Hearn (m. 1879; died 1893)
- Criminal charges: Theft
- Penalty: 10 years' penal servitude

Joseph Bolitho Johns (c. February 1826 – 13 August 1900), better known as Moondyne Joe, was a Cornish-Welsh convict and Western Australia's best-known bushranger. Born into poor and relatively difficult circumstances, he became something of a petty criminal robber with a strong sense of self-determination. He is remembered as a person who had escaped multiple times from prison.

== Biography ==
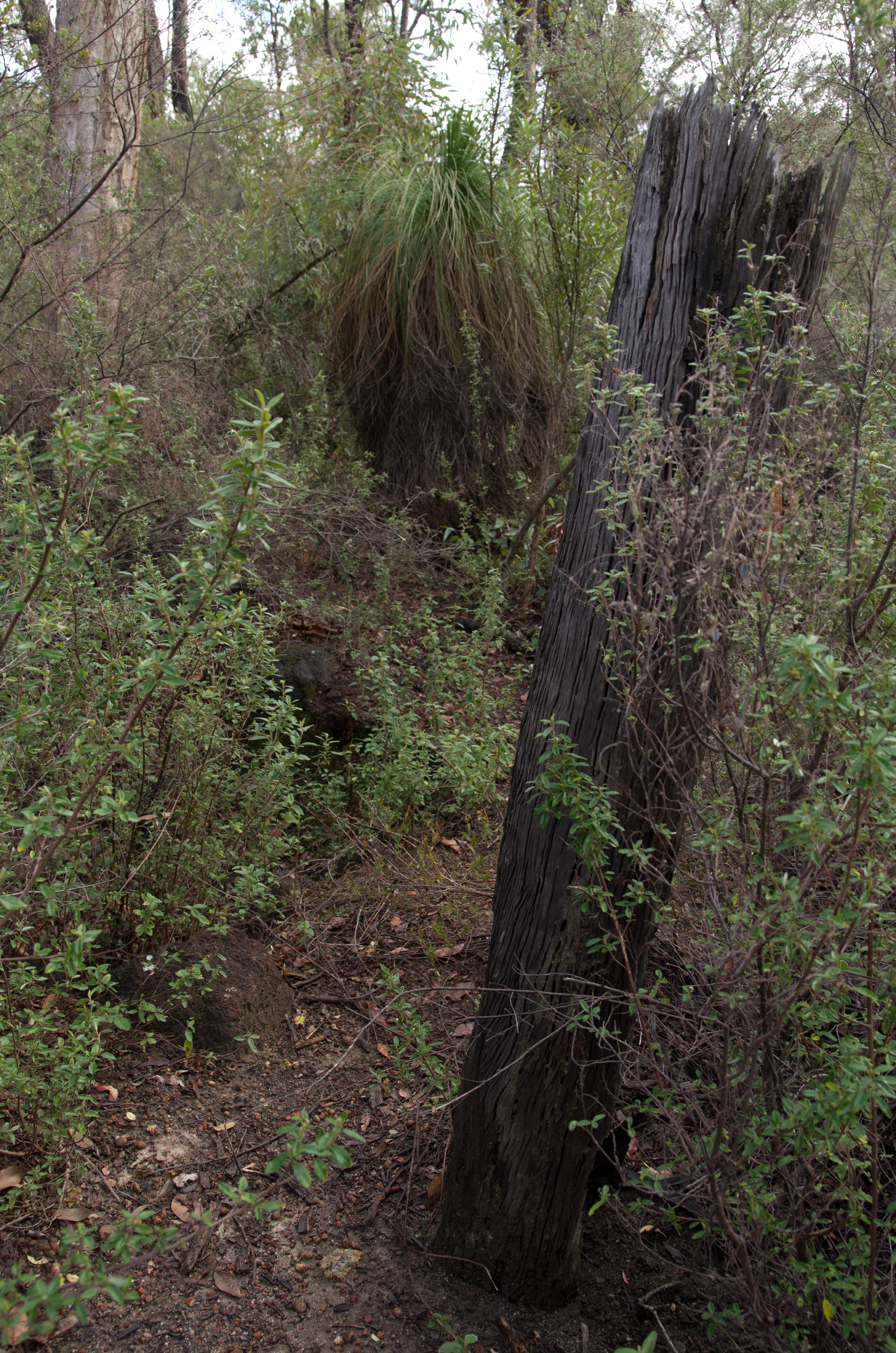
Remnants of a fence and well, built by Moondyne Joe

=== Childhood ===
Some say he was born in Cornwall but an online ANU source quotes him as being born in Wales, around 1826-27, and raised as a Protestant. He was baptised in the Parish Church at Wendron, married at Johnston Memorial Congregational church at Fremantle, and buried in the Anglican section of Fremantle Cemetery. Despite claims that he was Roman Catholic, there is no evidence for this and would be incredibly unusual in Cornwall. He was the third of three children of blacksmith Thomas Johns (1799–1833) and his wife Mary Bolitho (1804–1860). Joe was a tall man with black hair and hazel-coloured eyes, and it is likely that he contracted smallpox in his youth as, later, records describe him as "pockmarked". His father died some time in 1833, and Johns and his brother took work as copper miners. In 1841 the family was living at Porkellis, Cornwall, but by 1848 Johns had migrated to Wales, taking work as an iron ore miner, probably at the Clydach Iron Works.

=== Prison ===
On 15 November 1848, Johns and an associate using the name William Cross, the pseudonym for the convict John Williams, were arrested near Chepstow for "stealing from the house of Richard Price, three loaves of bread, one piece of bacon, several cheeses, and other goods". Arraigned at the Brecon Assizes on charges of burglary and stealing, the pair pleaded not guilty. On 23 March, they were tried at the Lent Assizes before William Erle. Newspaper reports of the trial suggest that the pair gave an unexpectedly spirited defence, but Johns was abrasive and "contravened the conventions of court procedure". The men were convicted and sentenced to ten years' penal servitude. (Note: Edgar (1990) observes that in several other cases brought before the same judge that day, guilty pleas to very similar charges resulted in sentences ranging from three weeks to three months.)

Johns and Williams were to spend the next seven months working on a government work party in the local area, before being transferred to Millbank Prison. On 1 January 1850, they were transferred to Pentonville Prison to serve their mandatory six months of solitary confinement. The pair were transferred to Dartmoor Prison on 21 October 1851, but shortly afterwards Johns was transferred to the Woolwich prison hulk Justitia, probably for disciplinary reasons. When the Justitia was destroyed by fire, he was transferred to the Defence. About a year later, he boarded the prison ship Pyrenees for transportation to what was then the British penal colony of Western Australia to serve out the remainder of his sentence. In turn, Williams was transported to Van Diemen's Land in March 1852.

=== Australia bound ===
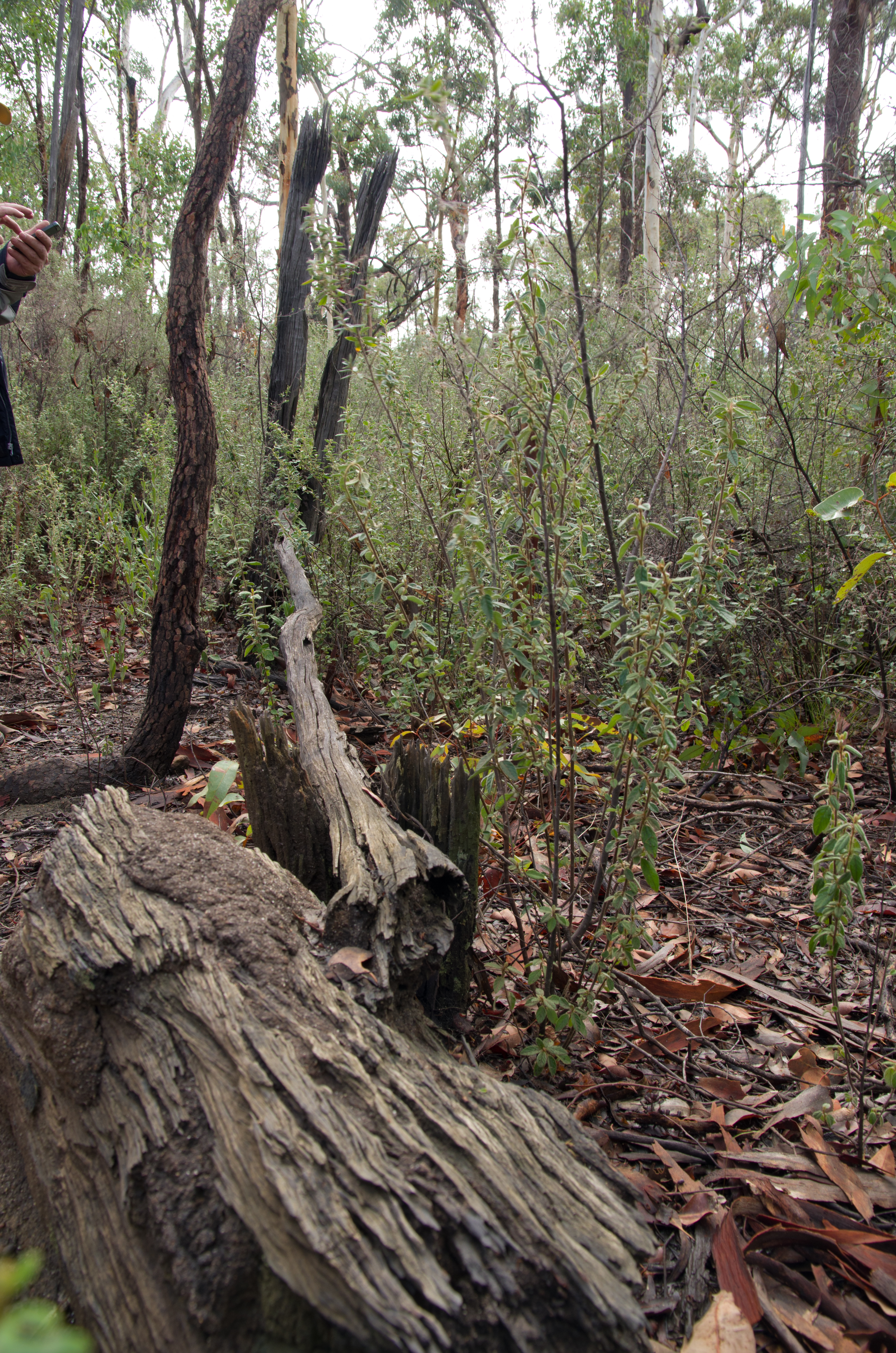
Remnants of Moondyne Joe's gate; it was this gate that he used to trap stock

Pyrenees sailed for Western Australia on 2 February 1853, and arrived in Fremantle on 30 April, with Johns as convict 1790. In reward for good behaviour, Johns was issued with a ticket of leave on arrival, and on 10 March 1855 he received a conditional pardon. He then settled in the Avon Valley, one of the most rugged and inaccessible places in the Darling Range. The Aboriginal name for the area was Moondyne. Johns made a living by partly fencing the springs in the area, and trapping escaped stock and horses. Often a reward was offered for the return of such animals.

In August 1861, Johns caught an unbranded stallion and branded it with his own mark. This was effectively horse stealing, and when the police heard of this they arrested him at their first opportunity. The horse was taken as evidence, and Johns was placed in the Toodyay lockup. Sometime during the night, Johns broke out of his cell, and stole the horse once more, taking also the local magistrate's brand-new saddle and bridle. He was caught the next day but, while on the run, he had killed the horse and cut his brand out of the hide, thus destroying the evidence. Consequently, he received only a three-year sentence for jail-breaking, whereas a typical sentence for horse stealing was more than ten years.

While Johns was serving his sentence, there was a rash of convict escapes and attempted escapes, but Johns remained well behaved. His good behaviour earned him a remission on his sentence, and he was released on a ticket of leave in February 1864. He then found work on Henry Martin's farm in Kelmscott. In January 1865, a steer named "Bright" belonging to William Wallace was killed, and Johns was accused of the deed. He was arrested on 29 March, found guilty on 5 July, and sentenced to ten years' penal servitude. Johns was to protest his innocence of this crime for the rest of his life. He was determined not to serve what he felt was an unjust sentence and, in early November, he and another prisoner absconded from a work party. They were on the run for nearly a month, during which time they committed a number of small robberies. It was during this time that Johns first adopted the nickname Moondyne Joe. They were finally caught 37 kilometres (23 miles) east of York by a party of policemen that included Tommy Windich, an Aboriginal tracker. For absconding and for being in possession of a firearm, Johns was sentenced to twelve months in irons, and transferred to Fremantle Prison.

=== Escape ===
In April 1866, Johns sent a petition to the Chief Justice, and received four years off his sentence. This was apparently unsatisfactory to him for, in July, he received a further six months in irons for trying to cut the lock out of his door. Early in August, he succeeded in escaping again. After cutting off his irons, he met up with three other escapees, and together they roamed the bush around Perth, committing a number of robberies and narrowly escaping capture on a number of occasions. Near the end of the month, one of the gang was captured by police. Realising that the gang could not elude the police forever, Johns formulated a plan to escape the colony by travelling overland to the colony of South Australia. This would be a long and arduous journey through extremely arid land, and the gang would have to be very well equipped if it were to stand any chance of success. On 5 September, Johns equipped his company by committing the biggest robbery of his career, stealing supplies and equipment from the Toodyay store of an old enemy, James Everett. The gang then started travelling east along the explorer Charles Hunt's established route. Their tracks were discovered by police on 26 September, about 160 kilometres (99 mi) east of York. A team of police then set out after them, and they were captured on 29 September 1866 at Boodalin Soak, about six kilometres (3.7 mi) north-west of the present-day site of the town of Westonia, approximately 300 kilometres (190 mi) north-east of Perth.

=== Hard labour ===
As punishment for escaping and for the robberies committed while on the run, Johns received five years' hard labour on top of his remaining sentence. Extraordinary measures were taken to ensure that Johns did not escape again. He was sent to Fremantle Prison, and kept in the yard with his neck chained to the iron bar of a window, while a special "escape-proof" cell was made for him. The stone-walled cell was lined with jarrah sleepers and over one thousand nails, and was almost air-proof and light-proof. Johns was kept in the cell on a bread and water diet, with only one to two hours of exercise a day. In early 1867, due to his diminishing health, Johns was set to work breaking stone in the open air but, rather than permit him to leave the prison, the acting comptroller-general ordered that the stone be brought in and dumped in a corner of the prison yard, where Johns worked under the constant supervision of a warder. Governor John Hampton was so confident of the arrangements, he was heard to say to Johns: "If you get out again, I'll forgive you". However, the rock broken by Johns was not removed regularly, and eventually a pile grew up until it obscured the guard's view of him below the waist. Partially hidden behind the pile of rocks, he occasionally swung his sledgehammer at the limestone wall of the prison.

On 7 March 1867, Johns escaped through a hole he had made in the prison wall. Despite an extensive manhunt, no sign of him was found, and he would not be recaptured for nearly two years. He did not return to any of his old haunts, and he committed no crimes, so the authorities received very little information about him. Also, many convicts were encouraged by Johns' audacious escape, and a number of escapes were attempted in the following months, so that he was quickly forgotten.

On 25 February 1869, Johns tried to steal some wine from the cellars at Houghton Winery. By chance, the owner had been helping with a police search, and afterwards invited a group of police back to the vineyard for refreshments. When the owner entered the cellar, Johns assumed that he was discovered, and made a dash for the door into the arms of the police. He was returned to prison, sentenced to an additional 12 months, half to be in separate confinement, for absconding. On 22 March 1869, he was sentenced to an additional four years in irons for breaking and entering. Johns made at least one more attempt to escape, attempting in February 1871 to create a key for his cell in the carpenter's workshop, but was unsuccessful. Eventually, in April 1871, Comptroller General Wakeford heard from Johns of Hampton's promise. After verifying with Superintendent Lefroy that those words were spoken, Wakeford informed the current governor, Frederick Weld, who agreed that further punishment would be unfair. Johns was given a ticket of leave in May 1871.

=== Later life ===
The remainder of Johns' life consisted of periods of good behaviour punctuated by occasional minor misdemeanors and brief jail terms. In January 1879, he married a widow named Louisa Hearn, and they spent some time prospecting for gold near Southern Cross. In 1881, while exploring the countryside around Karridale, he discovered Moondyne Cave.

=== Final years and death ===
In 1893, Johns' wife Louisa died at the age of 40, and the death affected him greatly. Years after, he began acting strangely, and was eventually found to be mentally ill. He died of senile dementia in the Fremantle Lunatic Asylum (now the Fremantle Arts Centre building) on 13 August 1900, and was buried in Fremantle Cemetery. His tombstone bears the word Welsh: rhyddid, 'freedom'.

== Cultural references ==
=== Literature and film ===
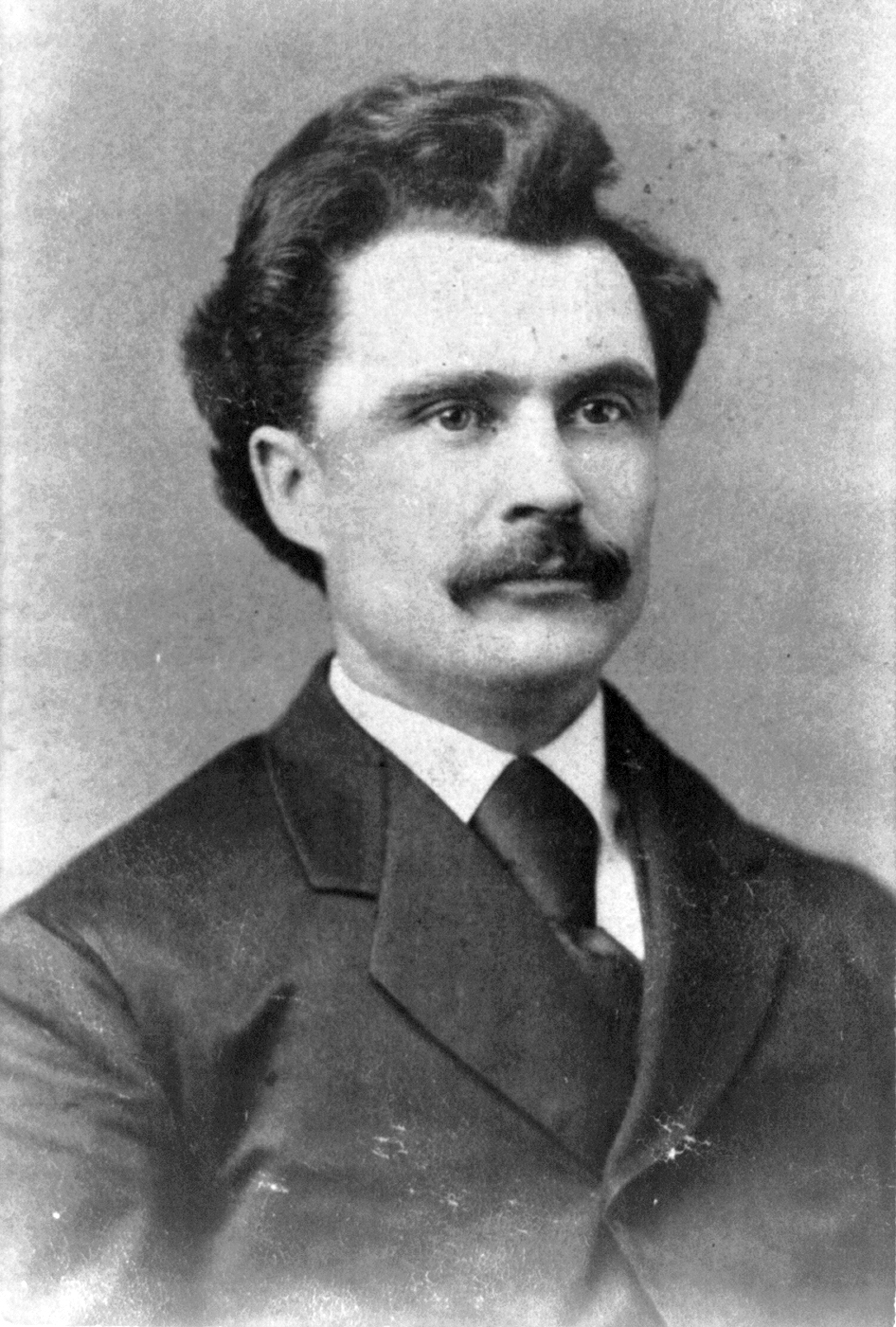
It has been said that the tales of Moondyne Joe inspired John Boyle O'Reilly to make his daring escape in 1869

While Moondyne Joe was bushranging in 1869, an Irish political prisoner named John Boyle O'Reilly was working in a convict road party near Bunbury. Although it is very unlikely that O'Reilly knew Moondyne Joe, he must have heard many stories of his exploits. In March 1869, O'Reilly escaped and was rescued by an American ship. After his arrival in the United States, he wrote a novel about convict life called Moondyne: An Australian Tale, whose central character was called Moondyne Joe. The book is presented as fiction, and neither the character nor the plot bears much resemblance to the life of Joseph Johns.

In 1913, O'Reilly's novel was made into a movie entitled Moondyne. Directed by W. J. Lincoln, it starred George Bryant, Godfrey Cass and Roy Redgrave.

Randolph Stow wrote a humorous children's book, Midnite: The Story of a Wild Colonial Boy, in 1967 which told the story of an Australian bushranger based on the life and exploits of Moondyne Joe and a Queensland bushranger Captain Starlight.

In 2002, Cygnet Books published The Legend of Moondyne Joe, a work of juvenile fiction written by Mark Greenwood and illustrated by Frané Lessac. The book won the award in the Children's Books category at the 2002 Western Australian Premier's Book Awards.

In 2012, Fremantle Press published a postmodern interpretation of Moondyne Joe's life, The Ballad of Moondyne Joe, including poems and prose by John Kinsella and Niall Lucy.

=== In song and verse ===
Mark Greenwood's work of juvenile fiction The Legend of Moondyne Joe won the award for Children's Books in the 2002 Western Australian Premier's Book Awards

The Ballad of Moondyne Joe

In the Darling Ranges, many years ago,
There lived a daring outlaw, by the name of 'Moondyne Joe'.
He stole the squatter's horses, and a sheep or two or three,
He loved to roam the countryside, and swore he would be free.
The troopers said we’ll catch him, but we know it's all in vain,
Every time we lock him up he breaks right out again.
'Cause in he goes, and out he goes, and off again he’ll go,
There's not a gaol in W.A. can keep in 'Moondyne Joe'.

Anonymous – sung by the public at the time of his 1867 escape

The Governor's son has got the pip,
The Governor's got the measles.
For Moondyne Joe has give 'em the slip,
Pop goes the weasel.

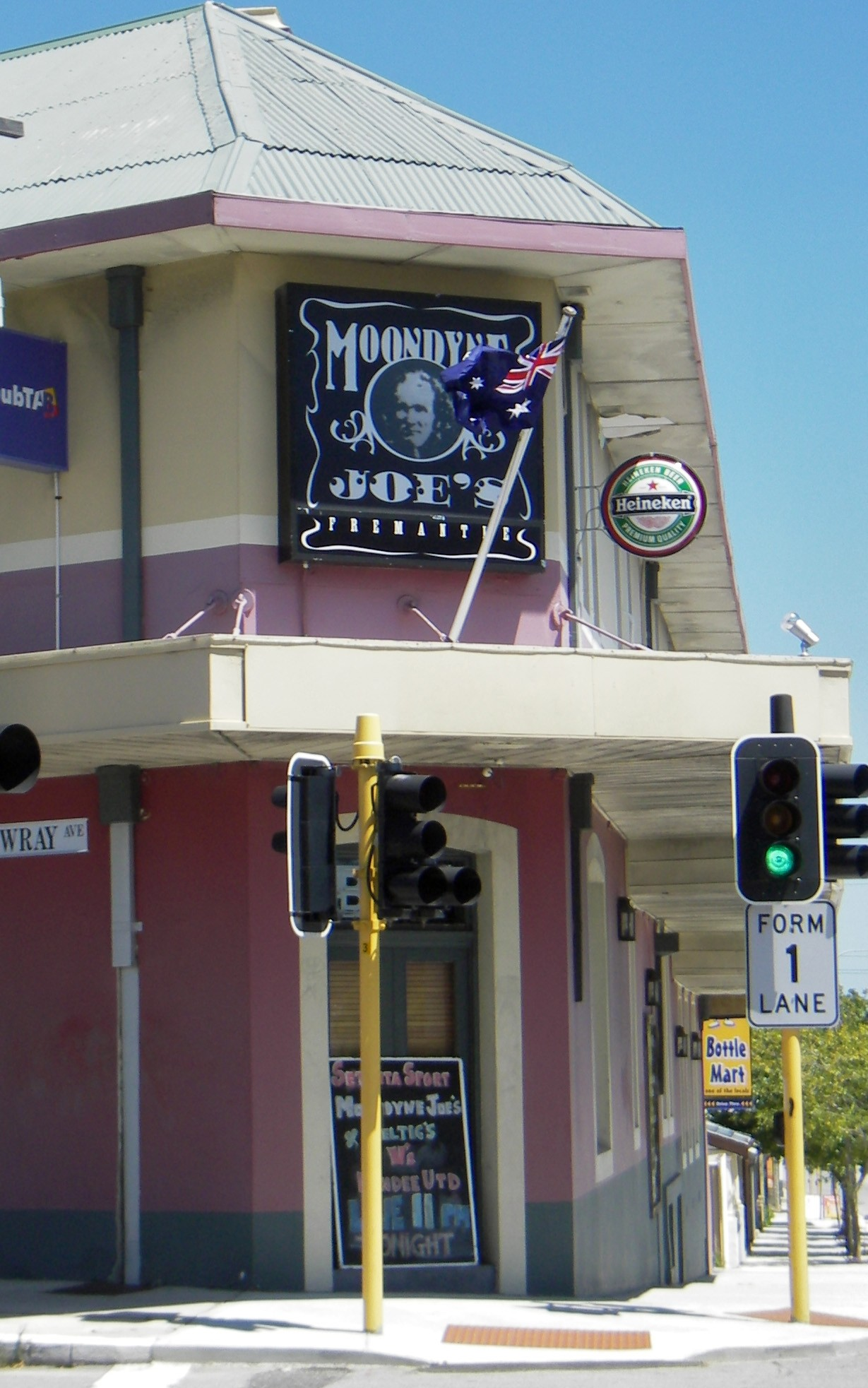
Moondyne Joe's Bar and Bistro, Fremantle, takes its name from the famous bushranger

Anonymous

It were Moondyne of course
That took Ferguson's horse.
He'd hidden the same
In the hills of that name.
When he found it had gone
Ferguson searched all the Swan,
And offered a pound
For when it was found.
But Joe has it hid
And he pockets the quid.
In a month to the day
Again the horse goes astray.
But Ferguson's no fool
Goes along to Moondyne Pool.
To see if it's true
The police comes too.
When his sentence is gone
Joe is done with the Swan.
They call me bushranger—
I'll feel quite a stranger;
So by the Mass
I'll try the Vasse.
At Ellensbrook
The silly old rook
Gets a job
At Fifteen Bob.
No more I don't know
That's the story of Moondyne Joe.

In 1982 a musical/play was written by Roy Abbott and Roger Montgomery of the Mucky Duck Bush Band and performed by Mucky Duck and friends at various venues.

=== Memorials ===
A railway siding on the Eastern Goldfields Railway in Johns' area of operations in the Avon Valley has been named Moondyne, most likely after the man rather than the area.

=== Festivals ===
On the first Sunday of May, the township of Toodyay celebrates the life and times of Moondyne Joe by holding the Moondyne Festival. This festival takes place in the main street with street theatre, market stalls, demonstrations and the entire town is generally transported back to earlier years.

== See also ==
- Cornish Australians
- List of convicts transported to Australia
- List of convict ship voyages to Western Australia
