= Abrakurrie Cave =

Wild cave in Western Australia

- Interactive map of Abrakurrie Cave
- Location: Nullarbor Plain, Western Australia
- Coordinates: 31°39′26″S 128°29′23″E
- Depth: −70 m (−230 ft)
- Length: Over 300 m (980 ft)
- Discovery: Before 1930s
- Geology: Karst
- Difficulty: Easy

Abrakurrie Cave is a wild cave on the Nullarbor Plain in Western Australia. It is located about 48 kilometres (30 mi) north west of Eucla and is reported to have the largest single cave chamber in the southern hemisphere. The stencils in the cave are the deepest penetration of Aboriginal art of any cave system in Australia.

== Exploration ==
Visits to the cave occurred as early as the 1880s.

The cave was explored by an expedition led by Captain J. M. Thompson in 1935. The explorers described a cave that was 366 metres (1,200 ft) in length, 49 metres (160 ft) wide and 46 metres (150 ft) deep. After progressing a further 250 feet (76 m) the group found the passage forked into two passages one of which continued a further 1,500 feet (457 m) leading to a huge cavern.

Photographs of the cave were published after the 1935 expedition.

It was a well documented cave by the 1960s.

== See also ==
- List of caves in Australia
