= List of caves in Australia =

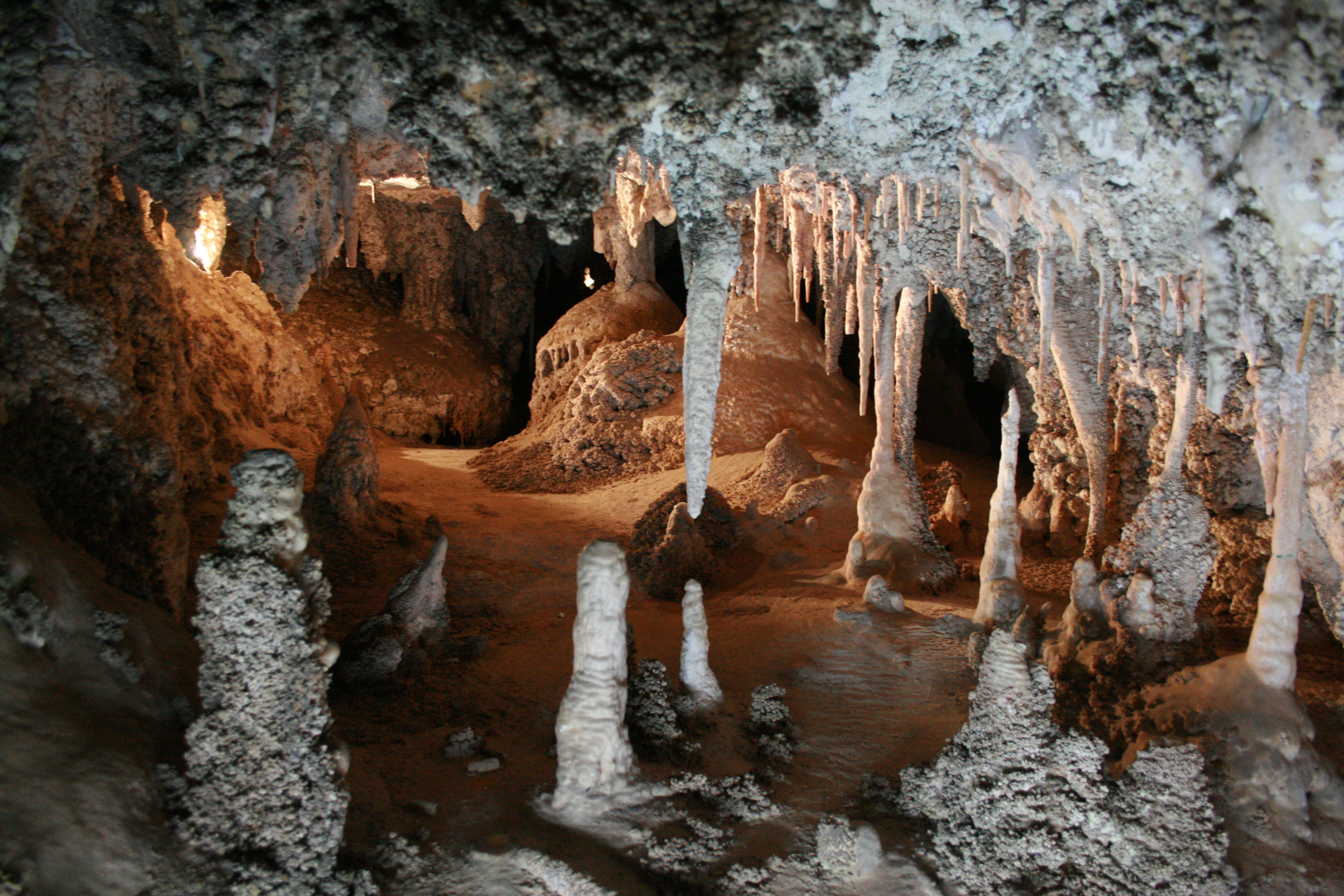
Limestone formations in the Imperial Cave at Jenolan Caves (2011)

This is a list of caves in Australia.

== Show caves ==
=== New South Wales ===
- Abercrombie Caves
- Ashford Caves
- Bendethera Caves
- Borenore Caves
- Bungonia Caves
- Careys Caves
- Cliefden Caves
- Jenolan Caves (List of caves within the Jenolan Caves karst)
- Timor Caves, Murrurundi, Hunter Valley
- Tuglow Caves
- Wee Jasper
- Wellington Caves
- Wombeyan Caves
  - Fig Tree Cave
  - Wollondilly Cave
  - Junction Cave
  - Kooringa Cave
  - Mulwaree Cave
  - Dennings Labyrinth
- Wyanbene Caves
- Yarrangobilly Caves

=== Queensland ===
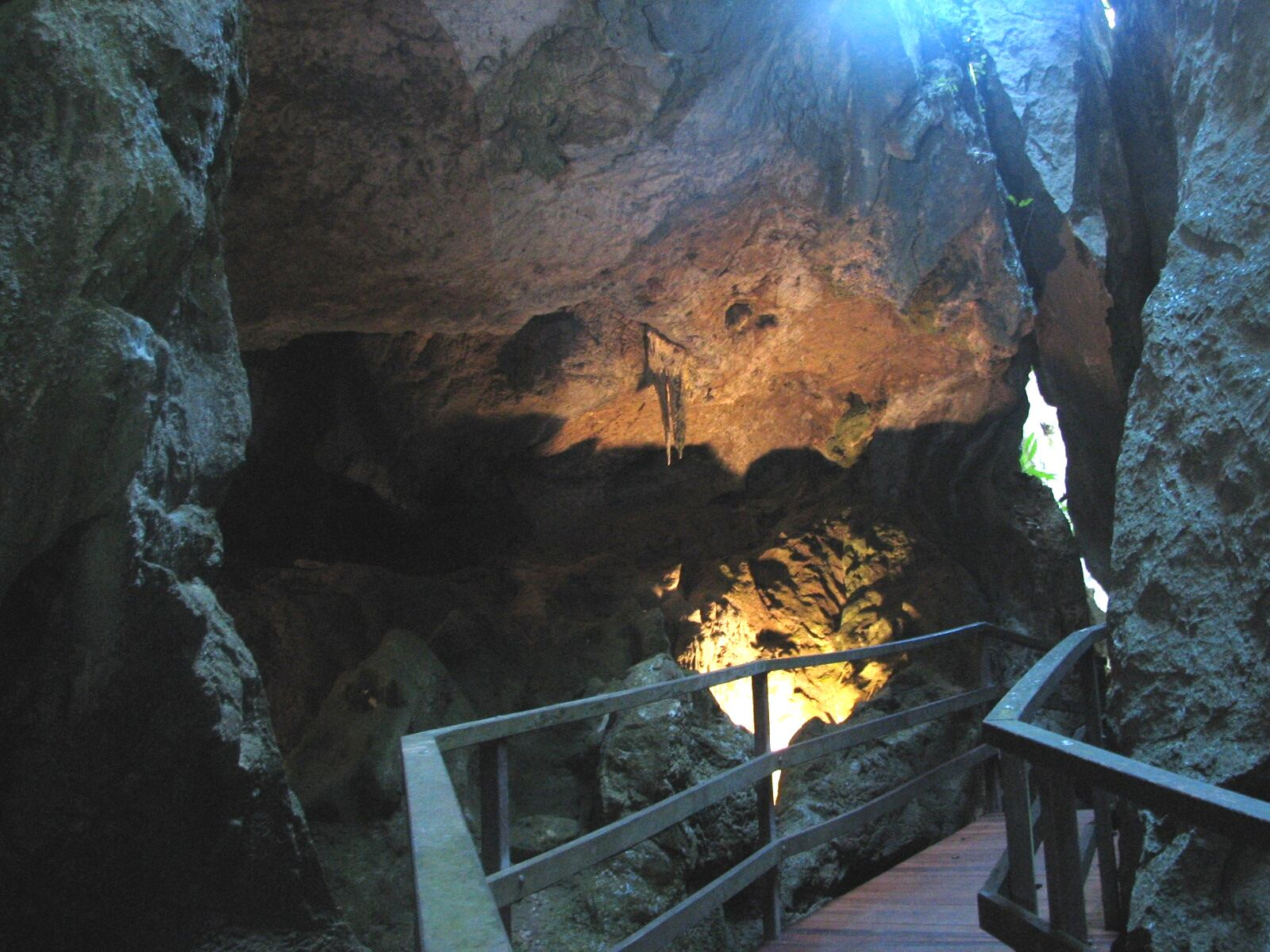
Capricorn Caves, 2010

- Capricorn Caves
- Chillagoe-Mungana Caves
  - Donna Cave
  - Trezkinn Cave
  - Royal Arch Cave

=== South Australia ===
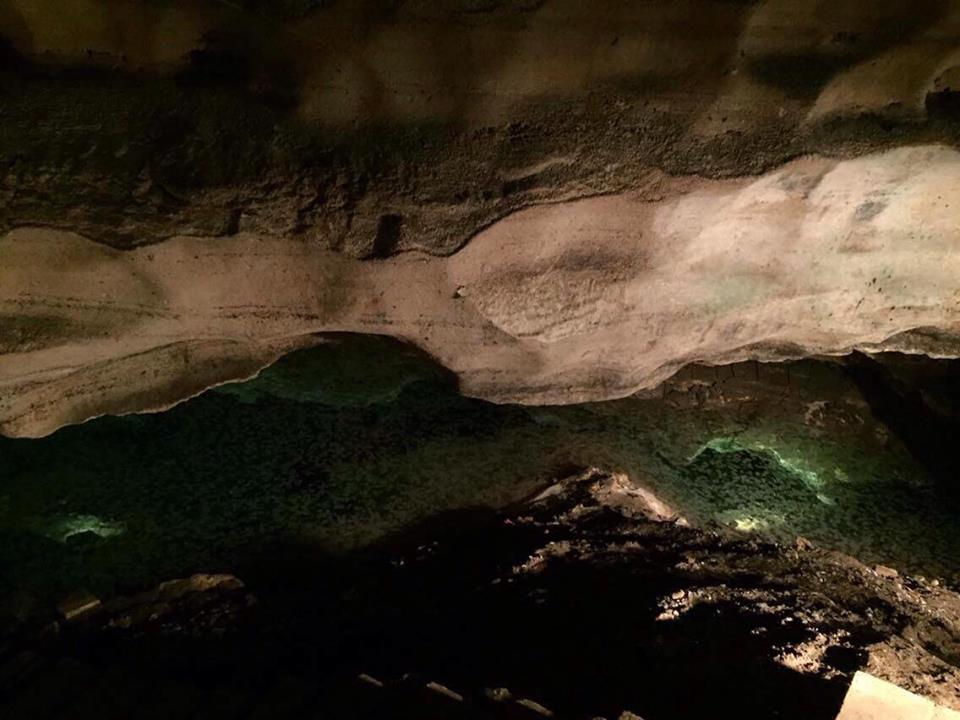
Engelbrecht Cave, 2016

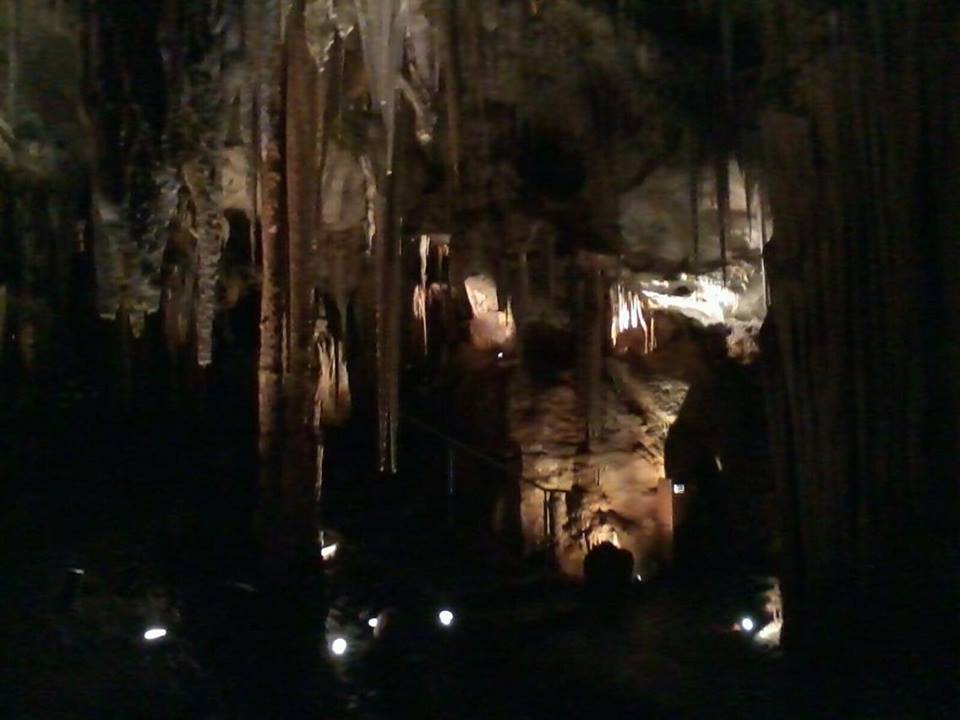
Tantanoola Cave, 2013

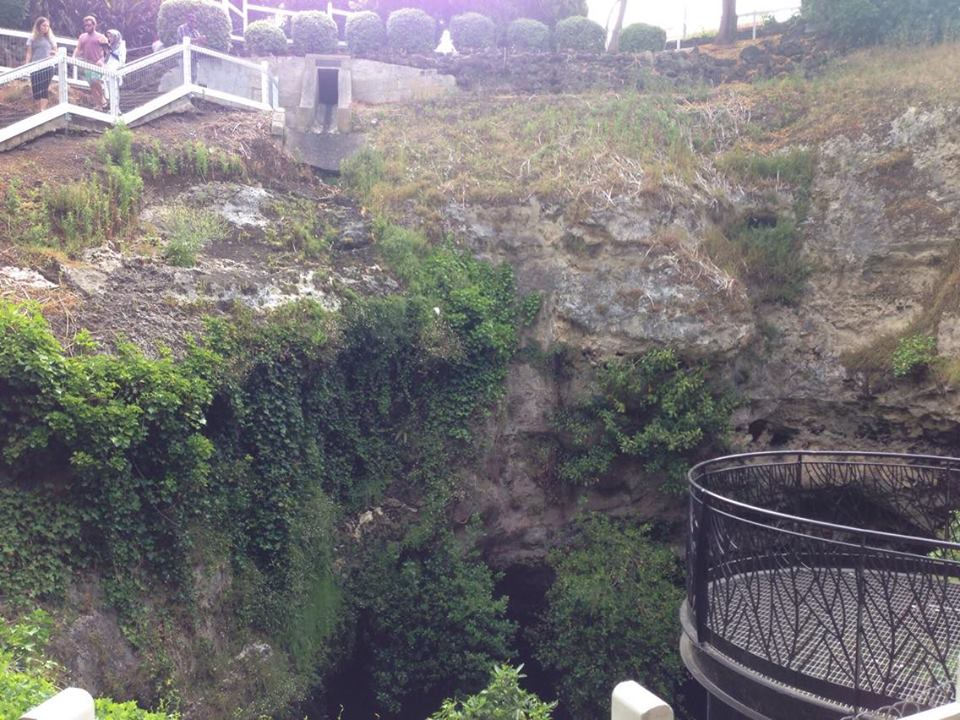
Cave Gardens, 2016

- Kangaroo Island
  - Kelly Hill Caves
- Lower South-East
  - Cave Gardens (Mount Gambier)
  - Engelbrecht Cave
  - Tantanoola Caves
- Upper South-East
  - Naracoorte Caves
    - Alexandra Cave
    - Blanche Cave
    - Victoria Fossil Cave
    - Wet Cave

=== Tasmania ===
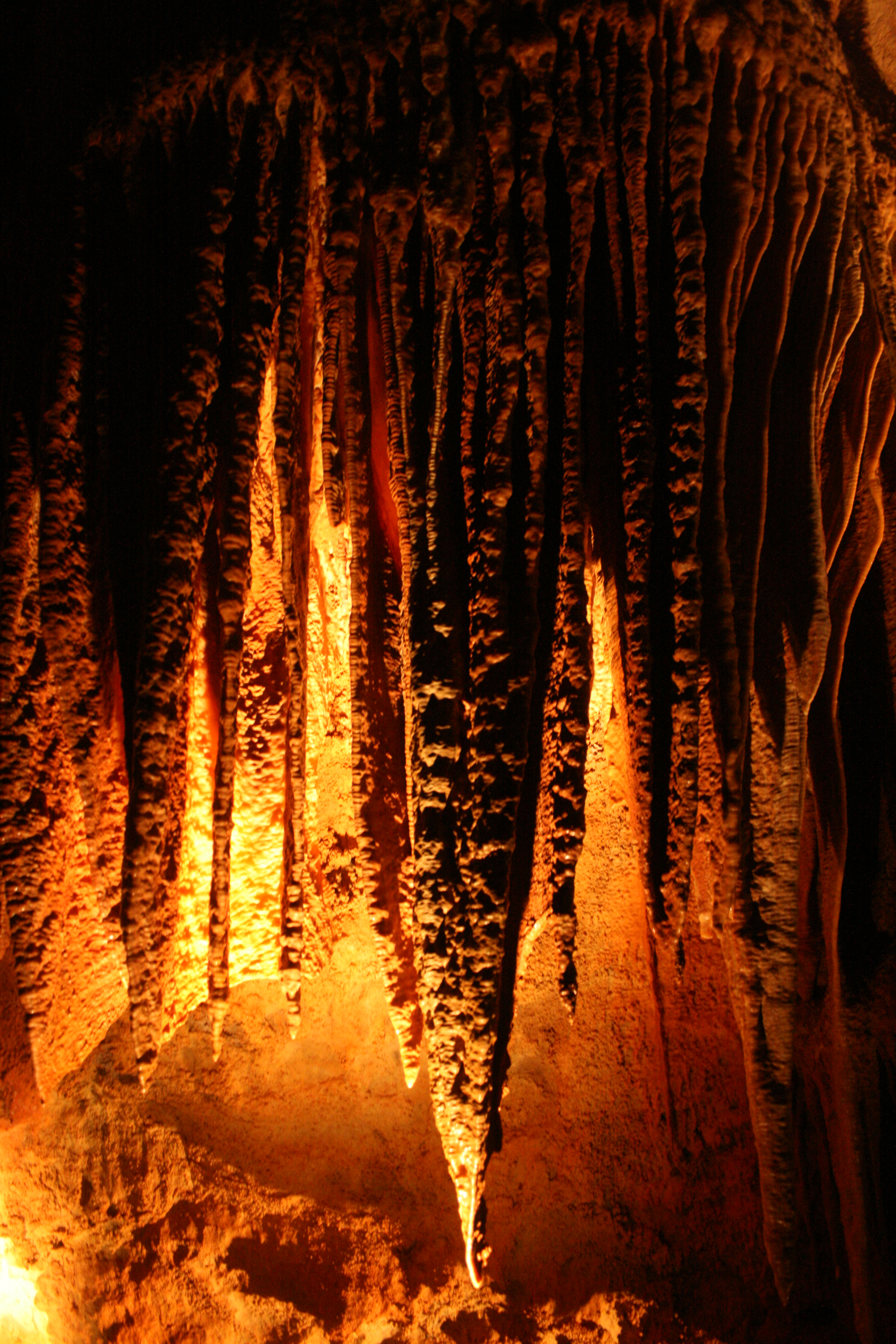
King Solomons Cave, 2010

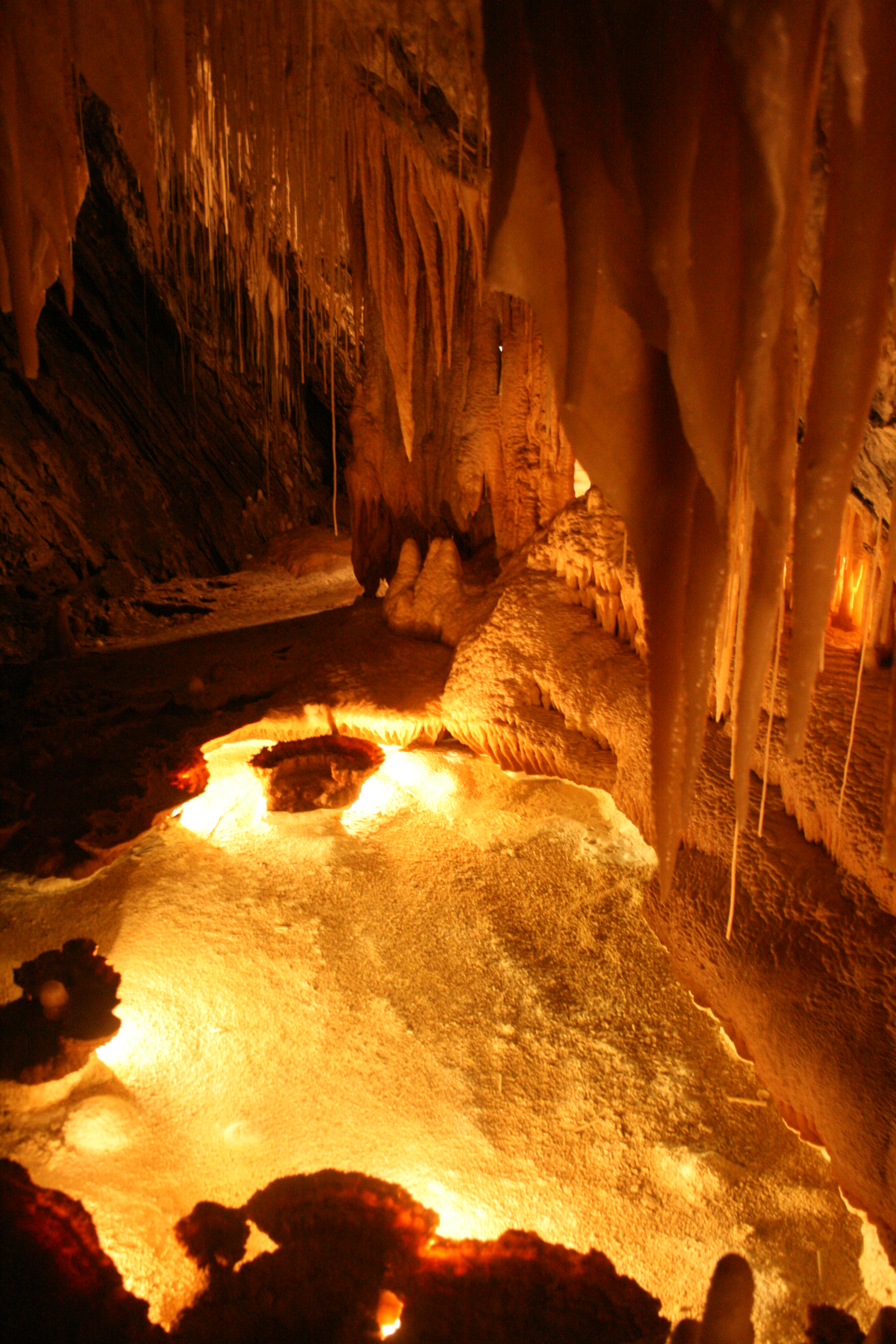
Marakoopa Cave, 2010

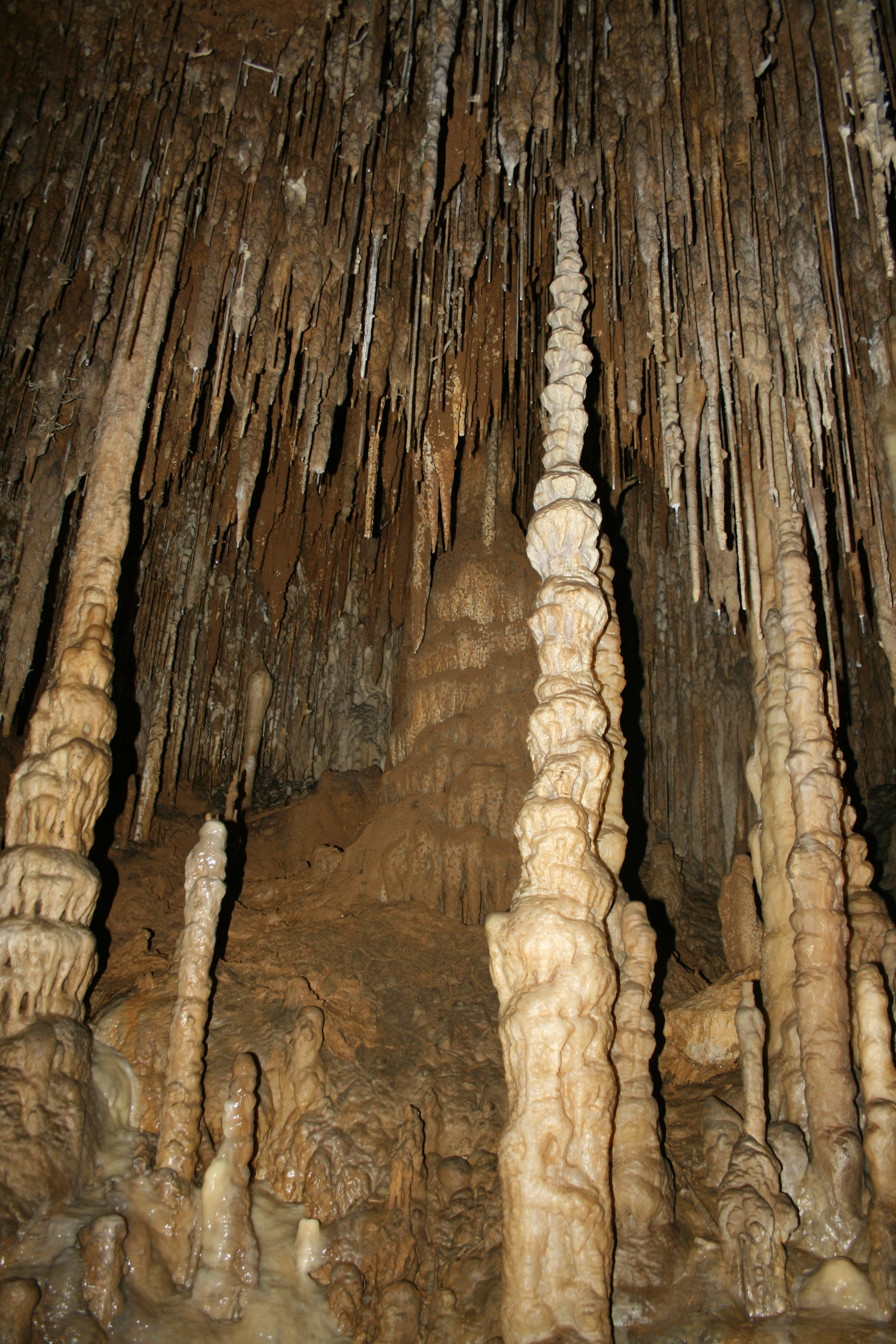
Newdegate Cave, 2010

- Gunns Plains Cave, Gunns Plains
- Mole Creek
  - King Solomons Cave
  - Marakoopa Cave
- Newdegate Cave, Hastings Caves

=== Victoria ===
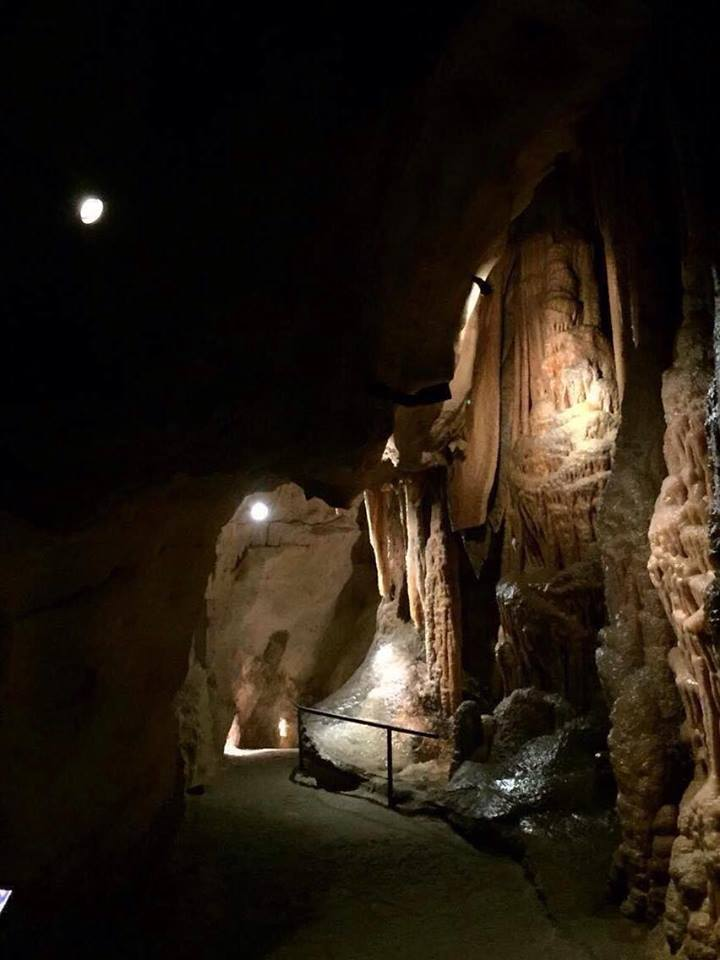
Princess Margaret Rose Cave, 2016

- Buchan
  - Buchan Caves
    - Fairy Cave
    - Royal Cave
  - Cloggs Cave
  - Murrindal
    - Shades of Death Cave
  - New Guinea II cave
- Byaduk Caves, Byaduk
- Glenelg River
  - Princess Margaret Rose Cave
- Tarragal Caves

=== Western Australia ===
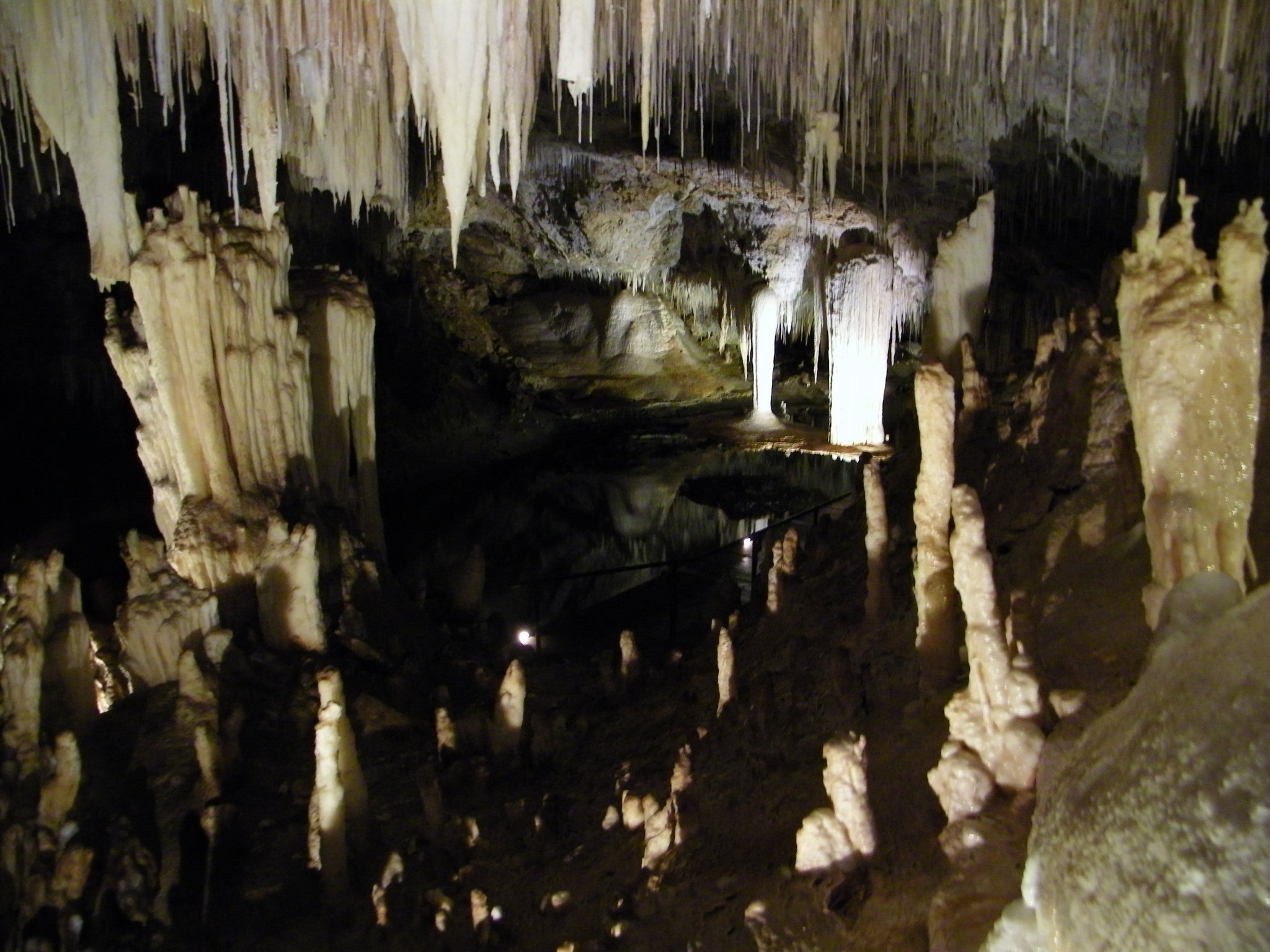
Lake Cave, 2010

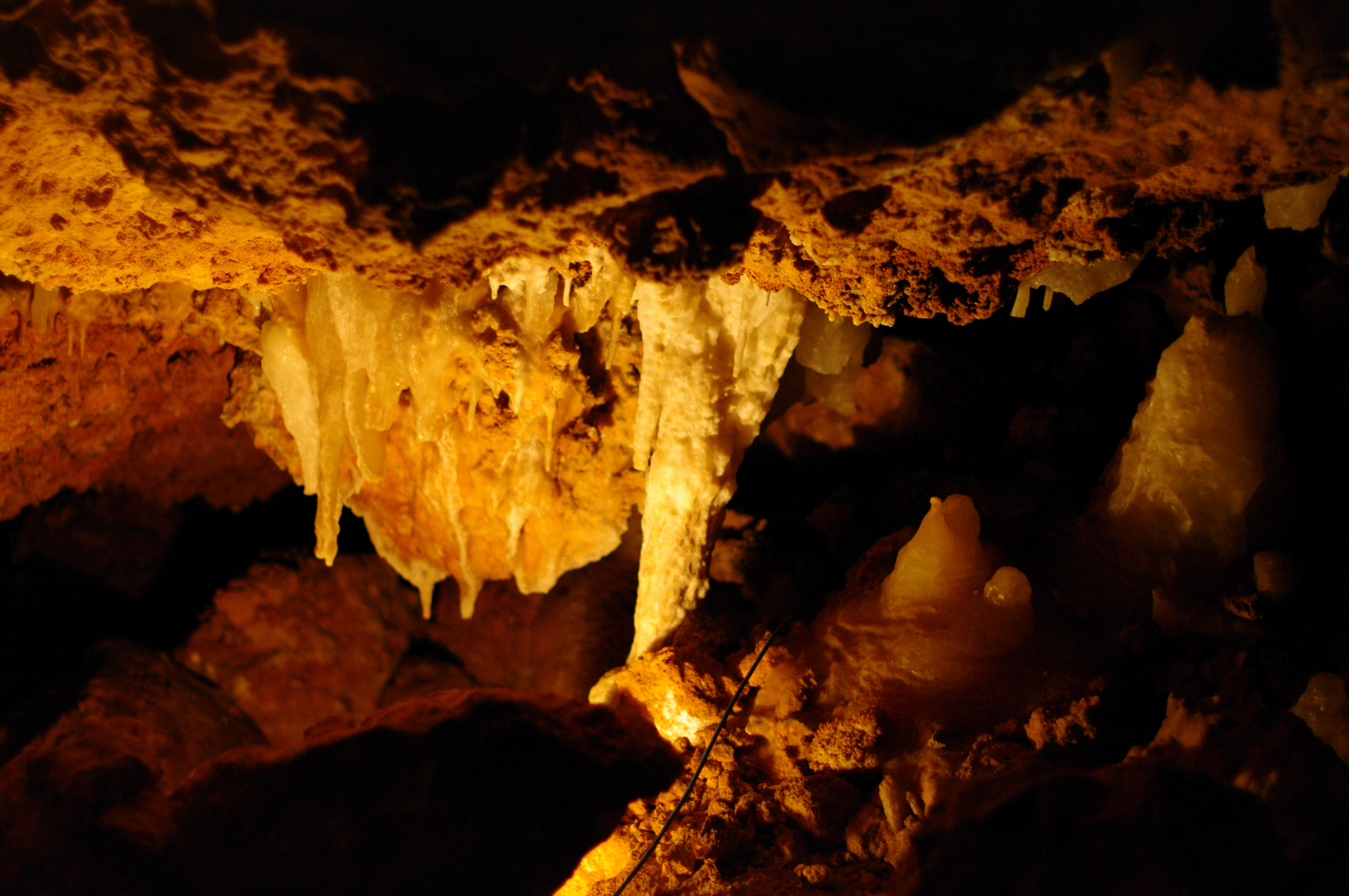
Ngilgi Cave, 2011

- South West
  - Jewel Cave
  - Lake Cave
  - Mammoth Cave
  - Moondyne Cave
  - Ngilgi Cave (formerly Yallingup Cave)
- Yanchep
  - Cabaret Cave
  - Crystal Cave
  - Yonderup Cave

=== Northern Territory ===
- Cutta Cutta Caves, Katherine

== Wild caves ==
=== New South Wales ===
- The Big Hole and Marble Arch
- Blue Water Holes
- Bungonia Caves
- Careys Cave
- Cave Island
- Cliefden Caves
- Colong Caves
- Cotter Caves
- Jenolan Caves
- Timor Caves
- Yarangobilly
- St Michaels Cave
- Wee Jasper
- Wombeyan Caves

=== Queensland ===
- Camooweal Caves
  - Five O’Clock Cave
  - Four Mile East Cave
  - Great Nowranie Cave
  - Little Nowranie Cave
  - Niggle Cave
- Chillagoe-Mungana Caves
  - The Archways
  - Pompeii Cave
  - Bauhinia Cave
- Undara
  - Undara Lava Tubes
- Mount Etna Caves National Park

=== South Australia ===
- Flinders Ranges
  - Mairs Cave
  - Mount Sims Cave
  - Narrina Lake Cave
  - Wooltana Cave
- Lower South-East
  - Fossil Cave
  - Sheathers Cave
  - Snake Hill Cave
- Murray River Area
  - Bakara Well Cave
  - Punyelroo Cave
  - River Road Cave
- Upper South-East
  - Appledore Cave
  - Beekeepers Cave
  - Brownsnake Cave
  - Cave Park Cave
  - Echidna Cave
  - Fox Cave
  - Little Victoria Cave
  - S102 Cave
  - VDC Cave
- Yorke Peninsula
  - Corra-Lynn Cave
  - Town Well Cave
  - Windmill Cave
- South-West
  - Koonalda Cave
  - Koongine Cave
  - Murrawijinie Cave

=== Tasmania ===
- Exit Cave, Ida Bay
- Growling Swallet, Junee Florentine Valley, Mount Field
- Honeycomb Caves, Caveside
- Mole Creek Caves
  - Khubla Khan
- Mystery Creek Cave, Ida Bay
- Wet Caves, Caveside

=== Victoria ===
  - Wilsons Cave
- Britannia Creek
  - Britannia Creek Caves
- Buchan
- Kavery's Cave
- Labertouche
  - Labertouche Cave

=== Western Australia ===
- Kimberly
  - Cave Springs Cave
  - Mimbi
  - Old Napier Downs Cave
  - Tunnel Creek
  - Wangahinnya Caves
- Mid West Gascoyne
  - Arramall Cave
  - Drovers Cave
  - Gooseberry Cave
  - Mystery Cave
  - Old River Cave
  - River Cave
  - Stockyard Gully Caves
    - Aiyennu Cave
    - Beekeepers Hole (also known as Uniwa Cave)
    - Stockyard Bridge
    - Stockyard Cave
    - Stockyard Tunnel
    - Weelawadji Cave
- Nullarbor
  - Abrakurrie Cave
  - Balladonia Cave
  - Cocklebiddy Cave
  - Horseshoe Cave
  - Kellys Cave
  - Koonalda (in South Australia)
  - Old Homestead Cave
  - Pannakin Plain Cave
  - Thampanna Cave
  - Stegamite Cave
  - Weebubbie Cave (in South Australia)
- Perth/Peel/Yanchep
  - The Catacombs
  - Concinna Cave
  - Gibb Cave
  - Gidgee Karupa (Spear Cave)
  - Kings Park Caves (tunnelled and extended during WW2 for Catalina FBY base)
  - Loch Overflow
  - Mambibby Cave
  - Mandurah Caves
  - Minnies Grotto
  - Rottnest Island Caves
  - Surprise Cave
  - Wanneroo Karst
  - Yanchep Cave
- Pilbara / Cape Range
  - Anomaly Cave
  - Bell Cave
  - Canyon Cave
  - Owl Roost Cave
- South West
  - Arumvale Pipe and Arumvale Cave
  - Beenup Cave
  - Blackboy Hollow
  - Bride
  - Calgardup
  - Cowarumup Cave
  - Deeondeeup Cave
  - Devils Lair and Nannup Cave
  - Dingo Cave
  - Easter Cave
  - Giant's
  - Golgotha Cave
  - Ketelack Cave
  - Labyrinth Cave
  - Lost Pearl Cave
  - Meekadorabee Cave
  - Mill Cave
  - Milligans Cave
  - Nannup
  - Northcote Grotto
  - Old Kudardup Cave
  - Quinninup Lake Cave
  - Snake Pit Cave
  - Strongs Cave
  - Tiger
  - Wallcliffe Cave
  - Witchcliffe Cave

=== Australian territories ===
- Christmas Island
  - Lava Tubes

=== Northern Territory ===
- Bullita Cave

== Underwater Caves ==
=== New South Wales ===
- Jenolan Caves
  - Barralong Cave
  - Blue Lake Cave
  - Cerberus Junction
  - Far Country Cave
  - Imperial Cave
  - Lethe Cave
  - Mammoth Cave
  - Pool of Cerberus Cave
  - Pool of Reflections Cave
  - Slug Lake Cave
  - Spider Cave
  - Styx River Spring Cave
- Wellington Caves
  - Anticline (Water) Cave
  - Cathedral Cave
  - Limekiln (McCavity) Cave
- Wombeyan Caves
  - Bullio Cave
  - Glass Cave

=== Queensland ===
- Camooweal Caves
  - Great Nowranie Cave
  - Hassles Cave
  - Niggle Cave
  - Spinifex Cave

=== South Australia ===
- Flingers Range Karst
  - Narrina Lake Cave
- Mount Gambier Karst region
  - Allendale Sinkhole
  - Alleyns (Death) Cave
  - Bakers Cave
  - Benara Sinkhole
  - Bottlebrush sinkhole (Banksia Cave)
  - Bullocks Hole Cave
  - Daves Cave
  - Devils Punchbowl Cave
  - Earls Cave
  - Ela Elap Cave
  - Engelbrechts Cave
  - Ewens Ponds Cave
  - Fossil Cave
  - Gouldens Hole Cave
  - Hancocks Cave
  - Hanns Cave
  - Hells Hole
  - Horse & Cart Sinkhole
  - Iddlebiddy Cave
  - Kilsbys Sinkhole
  - Little Blue Lake Cave
  - Maxs Hole Cave
  - McKays Shaft Cave
  - Mud Hole Cave
  - Nettlebed Cave
  - One Tree (Wurwurlooloo) Cave
  - Piccaninnie Ponds Cave
  - Quarry Cave
  - Sheathers Cave
  - Swim Through Cave
  - Tank Cave
  - Tantanoola Lake Cave
  - Teatree Sinkhole
  - Ten Eighty Cave
  - The Pines Cave
  - The Shaft Cave
  - The Sisters Cave
  - Three Sisters Cave
  - Woolwash Cave

=== Tasmania ===
- Mole Creek caves
  - Khubla Khan (Underwater segment)
- Junee Florentine Caves
  - Growling Swallet (Underwater segment)
  - Junee Cave
  - Lawrence Rivulet Rising Cave
  - Tigers Eye Cave

=== Victoria ===
- Murrindal Caves
  - Dalleys Sinkhole
  - Elk River Cave

=== Western Australia ===
- Cape Range Karst
  - 6C-215 Cave
  - Bundera Sinkhole
  - Dozer Cave
  - Gnamma Hole Cave
- Kimberly Karst
  - Kija Blue Sinkhole
  - KNI-52 Cave
  - KNI-64 Cave
  - Old Napier Downs Cave
  - Waterfall Cave
- Nullarbor Karst
  - Burnabbie Cave
  - Cocklebiddy Cave
  - Koonalda Cave
  - Mullamullang Cave
  - Murra-El-Elevyn Cave
  - Nurina Cave
  - Olwolgin Cave
  - Pannikin Plains Cave
  - Slot Cave
  - Tommy Grahams Cave
  - Warbla Cave
  - Weebubbie Cave
  - Winbirra Cave
- South Hill River Karst
  - Toombstones (Wolka Wolka Well) Cave

=== Australian Territories ===
- Christmas Island
  - Thundercliff Cave
  - West White Beach Cave

=== Northern Territory ===
- Kathrine Karst
  - Kathrine Hot Springs

== See also ==
- List of caves (Global)
- Speleology
- Cave diving
- Caving (Also known as Spelunking or Potholing)
- Karst
- Cave diving regions of the world
