= Mammoth Cave (Western Australia) =

Cave in Western Australia

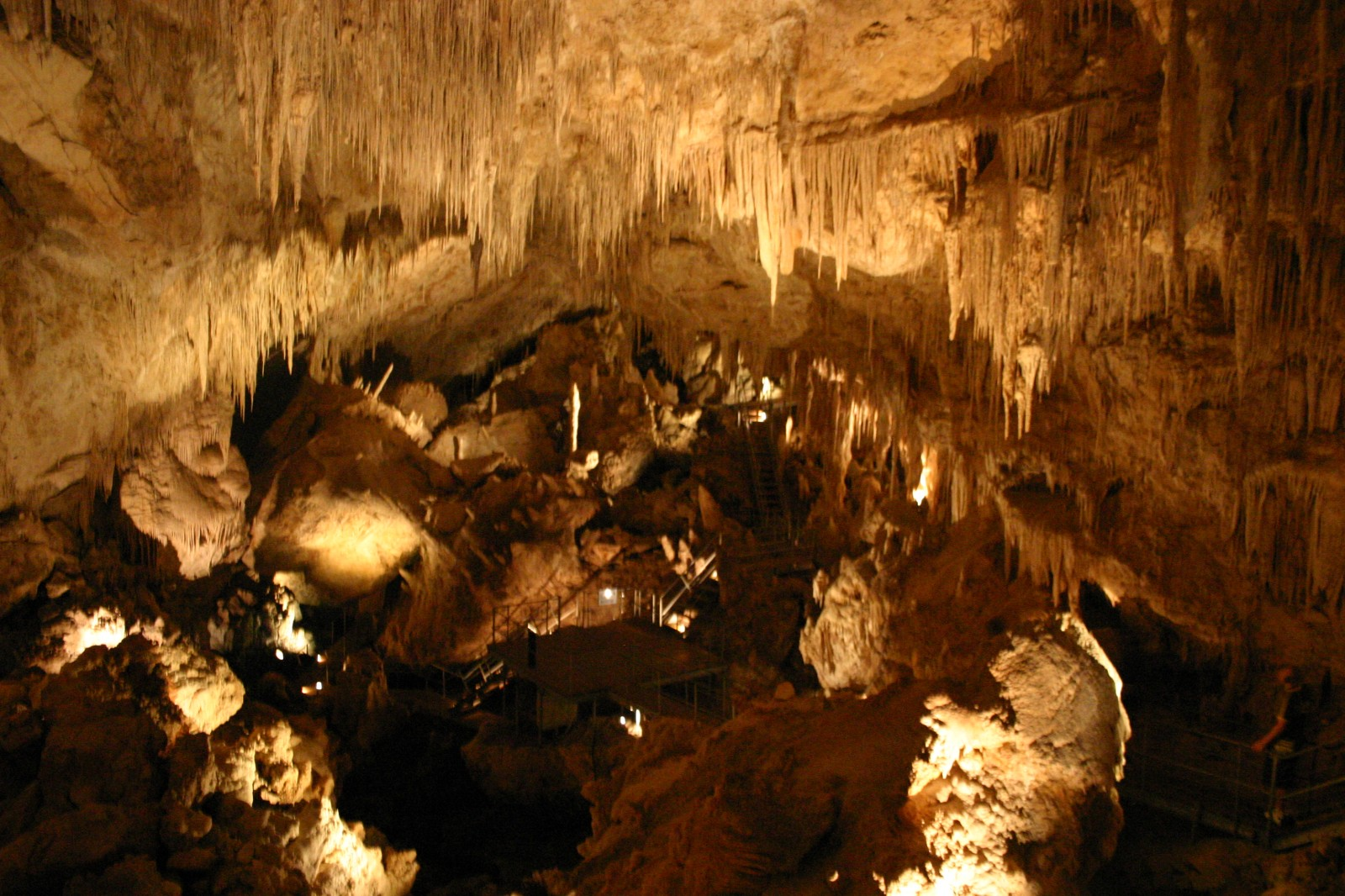
- Interior of Mammoth Cave
- Interactive map of Mammoth Cave
- Location: Boranup, Western Australia
- Coordinates: 34°03′29″S 115°01′50″E
- Depth: 30 m (98 ft)
- Length: 500 m (1,600 ft)
- Discovery: 1850 (European)
- Geology: Karst cave
- Access: Self-guided audio tours
- Registry: 6WI-38

Mammoth Cave is a large limestone cave 21 km (13 mi) south of the town of Margaret River in south-western Western Australia, and about 300 km (190 mi) south of Perth. It lies within the Leeuwin-Naturaliste National Park and is surrounded by karri and marri forest. There have been extinct animal fossils found in Mammoth Cave.

== Exploration ==
The cave is 500 m (1,600 ft) long and 30 m (98 ft) deep. It has been known from about 1850 to European settlers of the Margaret River district, but it was not explored until 1895. Its first explorer, Tim Connelly, who was appointed caretaker of the cave, conducted tours by lamplight until 1904 when electric lighting was installed.

== Fossils ==
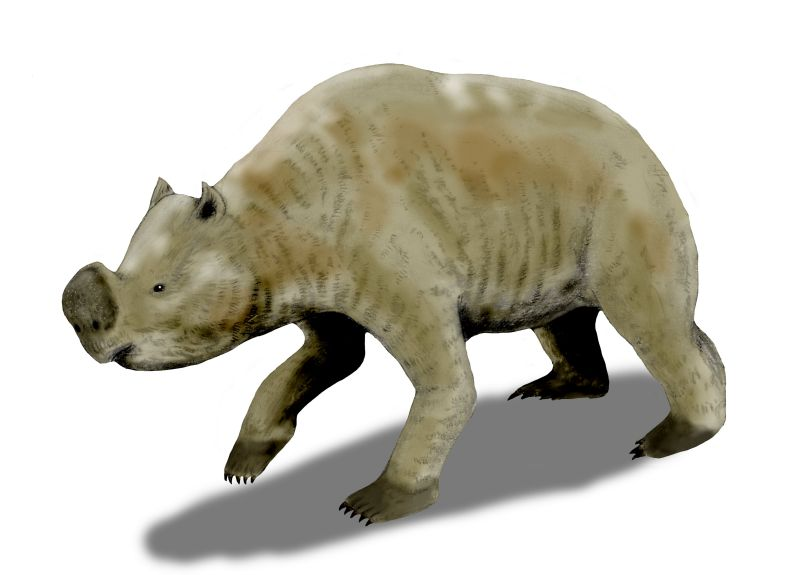
Reconstruction of Zygomaturus, fossil remains of which have been found in Mammoth Cave

The cave has been studied for over a century. It has yielded fossils of Pleistocene fauna over 35,000 years old, including those of thylacines and the giant marsupial herbivore Zygomaturus.
