= Moondyne Cave =

Cave in Western Australia

- Interactive map of Moondyne Cave
- Location: Augusta, Western Australia
- Coordinates: 34°16′24″S 115°05′53″E
- Depth: 26 m (85 ft)
- Length: 270 m (890 ft)
- Discovery: 1881 (European)
- Geology: Karst cave
- Access: By booking
- Registry: 6AU-11

Moondyne Cave is a karst cave in the South West region of Western Australia. It is located on Caves Road, 8 kilometres (5 mi) north of Augusta.

It has a pothole entrance, a vertical extent of 26 metres (85 ft), and a length of 270 m (890 ft), with some large dry chambers.

Moondyne Cave was discovered in 1881 by Joseph Bolitho Johns, who had formerly been the bushranger known as Moondyne Joe. It was first opened for public viewing in 1911. Guided tours ended in 1959, but it was reopened in 1992 after undergoing restoration. Moondyne Cave is not currently open for tours.

== See also ==
- List of caves in Australia
