= The Bells (1926 film) =

1926 film

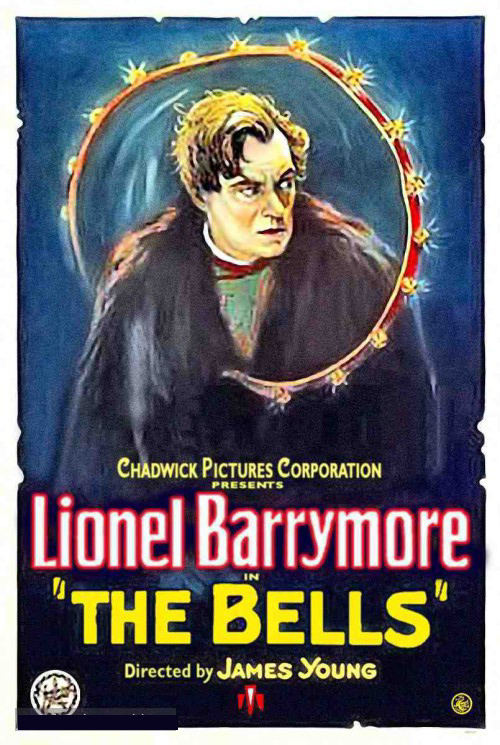
- Film poster
- Directed by: James Young
- Written by: James Young
- Based on: Le Juif Polonais (1867 play by Alexandre Chatrian and Émile Erckmann); The Bells (1871 English version of the play by Leopold Lewis)
- Produced by: I. E. Chadwick
- Starring: Lionel Barrymore; Caroline Frances Cooke
- Cinematography: L. William O'Connell
- Distributed by: Chadwick Pictures
- Release date: July 30, 1926
- Running time: 92 minutes
- Country: United States
- Language: Silent (English intertitles)

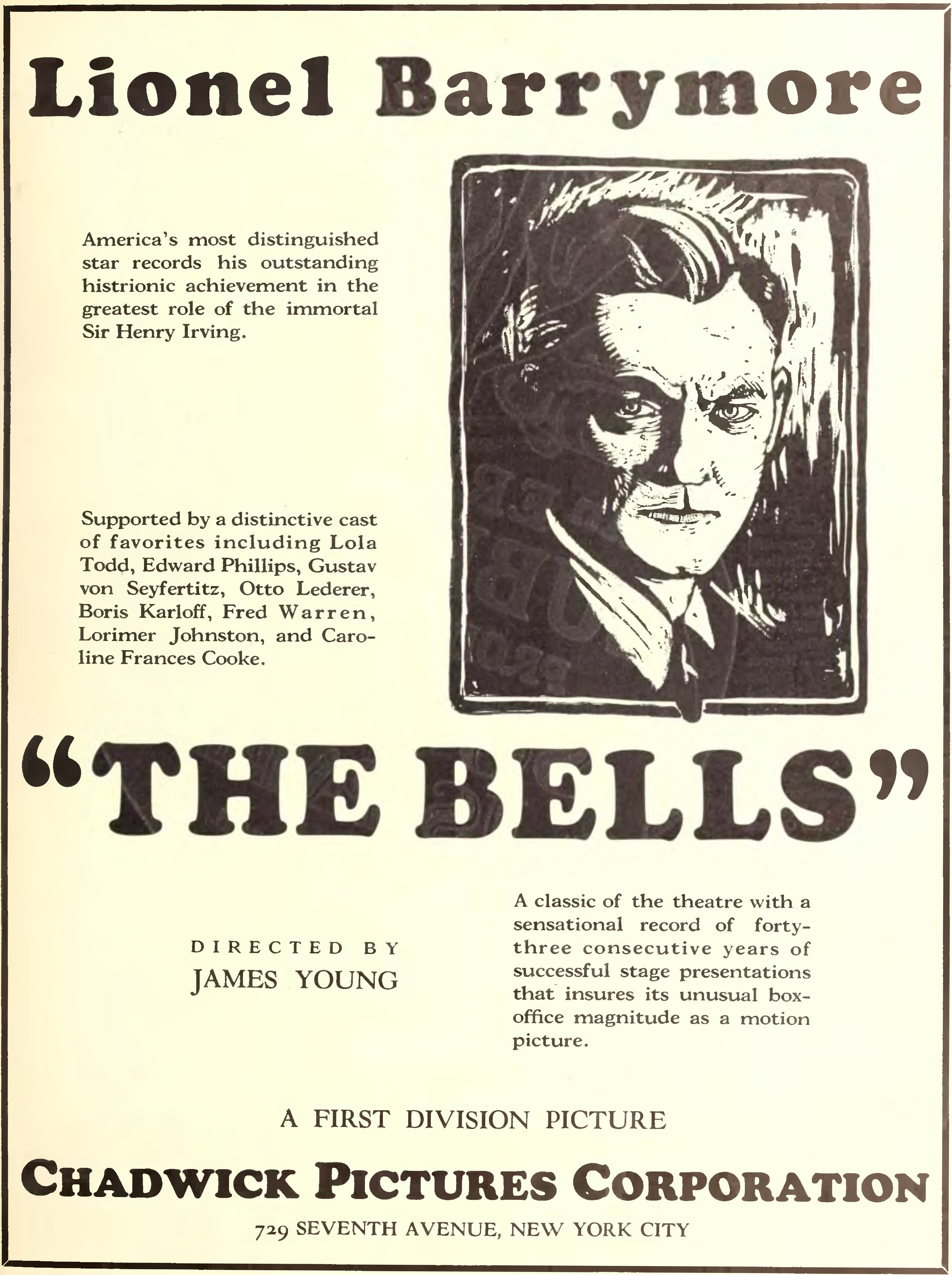
The Bells ad in Motion Picture News, 1926

The Bells is a 1926 American silent crime film directed by James Young and starring Lionel Barrymore and Boris Karloff. It was based on an 1867 French stage play called Le Juif Polonais (The Polish Jew) by Erckmann-Chatrian. The play was translated to English in 1871 by Leopold Lewis at which time it was retitled The Bells. The English version of the play was performed in the U.S. in the 19th century by Sir Henry Irving. Le Juif Polonais was also adapted into an opera of the same name in three acts by Camille Erlanger, composed to a libretto by Henri Cain.

The play was adapted into a number of film adaptations; an Australian film in 1911 directed by W. J. Lincoln, a 1913 American film directed by Oscar Apfel, a 1918 American film The Bells (1918 film) directed by Ernest C. Warde, a 1925 British-Belgian film (aka Le juif polonais) directed by Harry Southwell, the 1926 Hollywood film starring Lionel Barrymore and Boris Karloff, and a British film in 1931 which starred Donald Caltrop as Mathias. Harry Southwell remade the film again later in Australia as The Burgomeister (1935).

Footage from The Bells (1926) was re-used in two short films: The Mesmerist, and Light Is Calling by Bill Morrison.

== Plot ==
Mathias, an innkeeper with several other businesses, seeks to be burgomaster of a small Austrian hamlet. In order to gain favor with local leaders, he offers food and alcohol on credit, but often refuses to collect, much to the dismay of his wife Catharine. Mathias is deeply in debt to Frantz, who seeks Mathias' businesses. He will forgive the debt if Mathias allows him to marry his daughter, Annette. Mathias refuses, and is worried about the debt which will come due soon.

One evening a Polish Jew enters Mathias' inn. The man displays a money belt filled with gold, which Mathias, having had much to drink with the man, eyes closely. When the man leaves in a blizzard, Mathias pursues and kills him; before he dies, the man shakes a set of horse bells at him. Having come into money through murder, Mathias pays off his debt, provides a dowry for his daughter to marry, and is elected burgomaster. However, he is haunted by the sound of bells and hallucinations of the man he killed. The man's brother comes and offers a reward, bringing a "mesmerist" to help find the murderer. Mathias is pursued by the mesmerist and his own guilt throughout the rest of the film. He suffers hallucinations and nightmarish dreams of the murdered man until the final reel, in which he confesses his crime aloud to the ghost, then collapses, dead.

== Cast ==
- Lionel Barrymore as Mathias
- Caroline Frances Cooke as Catharine
- Gustav von Seyffertitz as Jerome Frantz
- Lorimer Johnston as Hans
- Eddie Phillips as Christian (as Edward Phillips)
- Lola Todd as Annette
- Laura La Varnie as Fortune teller (as Laura Lavarnie)
- Boris Karloff as The Mesmerist
- E. Alyn Warren as Jethro Koweski/Baruch Koweski
- John George (uncredited)

== See also ==
- Boris Karloff performances
- Lionel Barrymore on stage, screen and radio
- The Bells (1911 film)
- The Bells (1918 film)
- The Bells (1931 film)
- The Burgomeister (1935 film)
