= The Bells (1931 film) =

1931 British film by Harcourt Templeman

- Trade advertisement
- Directed by: Harcourt Templeman; Oscar Werndorff
- Written by: C. H. Dand
- Based on: The Bells by Leopold Lewis
- Produced by: Sergei Nolbandov; Isidore Schlesinger
- Starring: Donald Calthrop; Jane Welsh; Edward Sinclair
- Music by: Gustav Holst
- Production company: British Sound Film Productions
- Distributed by: Producers Distributing Corporation
- Release date: 1931
- Running time: 75 minutes
- Country: United Kingdom
- Language: English

The Bells is a 1931 British drama film directed by Harcourt Templeman and Oscar Werndorff and starring Donald Calthrop, Jane Welsh and Edward Sinclair. It was written by C.H. Dand based on the 1867 play Le Juif Polonais by Alexandre Chatrian and Emile Erckmann, and the 1871 English translation The Bells by Leopold Lewis.

The film was originally released with the only film score written by Gustav Holst.

== Plot ==
Mathias, an Alsatian innkeeper, murders a rich Pole staying at his inn. His conscience will not let him rest, and the Pole's spirit drives him nearly mad.

The victim's brother calls for an inquest and brings a sideshow hypnotist, who is supposed to read minds. Mathias, as burgomaster, is called upon to conduct the inquest but, under the intuitive eye of the hypnotist, cannot endure the torment of his own conscience.

== Cast ==
- Donald Calthrop as Mathias
- Jane Welsh as Annette
- Edward Sinclair as Sergeant Christian Nash
- O. B. Clarence as the night watchman
- Wilfred Shine as the drunken philosopher
- Ralph Truman as the blacksmith
- Anita Sharp-Bolster
- Carol Rees
- Bill Shine

== Reception ==
Film Weekly wrote: "From a technical point of view the film is something an achievement. But as entertainment it is tedious and unreal. Donald Calthrop, as the Burgomaster, gives a fine performance somewhat in the melodramatic manner famous in the original play. Jane Welsh has little to do, but does it fairly well, and Edward Sinclair is adequate, but rather wooden."

Kine Weekly wrote: "A brilliant performance by Donald Calthrop; that is the cutstanding feature in this rather meticulously clever production of the melodrama which Irving made famous. There are some excellent camera effects, but the story lacks vitality and is apt to drag. ... One feels that Oscar Werndorff and Harcourt Templeman have lost dramatic value in striving after constructional cleverness. The treatment is definitely Teutonic, with chiaroscuro effects and rapid black-outs. The direction of the artistes is good, but the artificiality increases as the plot progresses, and ends on a note of phantasy which is effective camera work but not good drama."

The Daily Film Renter wrote: "Screen adaptation of famous stage melodrama. Technical excellence cannot compensate for out-moded story, unnecessary length of footage and excessively slow tempo. ... Donald Calthrop gives a sound rendering of the part of the unfortunate old Burgomaster though in a manner more in accordance with the tradition of the last generation than the present one. Edward Sinclair, as the police officer, while certainly restrained at no time rises to great heights. Jane Welsh as the Burgomaster's daughter is refreshingly natural, and O. B. Clarence as the night watchman gives a carefully studied characterisation. Nevertheless one must repeat that while by no means devoid of merit, this is a picture whose appeal can be said to be definitely limited to the older generation of picture-goer, and as such its general attraction must necessarily be very restricted."

Picturegoer wrote: "Even Donald Calthrop's brilliant performance is unable to put life into this screen version of the melodrama made famous by Sir Henry Irving. Besides the fact that Calthrop is hopelessly miscast, there is no real vitality about the picture; it is entirely artificial and very slow in action. To some extent, this is counteracted by very clever camera work, which includes various kaleidescopic effects, rapid 'blackouts,' and a general tendency to follow the lines of German technique."

Picture Show wrote: "The talking-screen version of the book from which Sir Henry Irving's play was taken has been developed with moments of brilliance and marvellously beautiful camera work, but the story is disconnected and prevents the film from gripping as it should."

== Preservation ==
The British Film Institute has classed The Bells as a lost film. Its National Archive holds a collection of stills but no film or video materials. In 1974, Imogen Holst wrote that its score is also lost.

== See also ==
- List of lost films
- The Bells (Australia 1911)
- The Bells (US 1918)
- The Bells (US 1926)
- The Burgomeister (Australia 1935)
