= The Bells (1918 film) =

1918 film

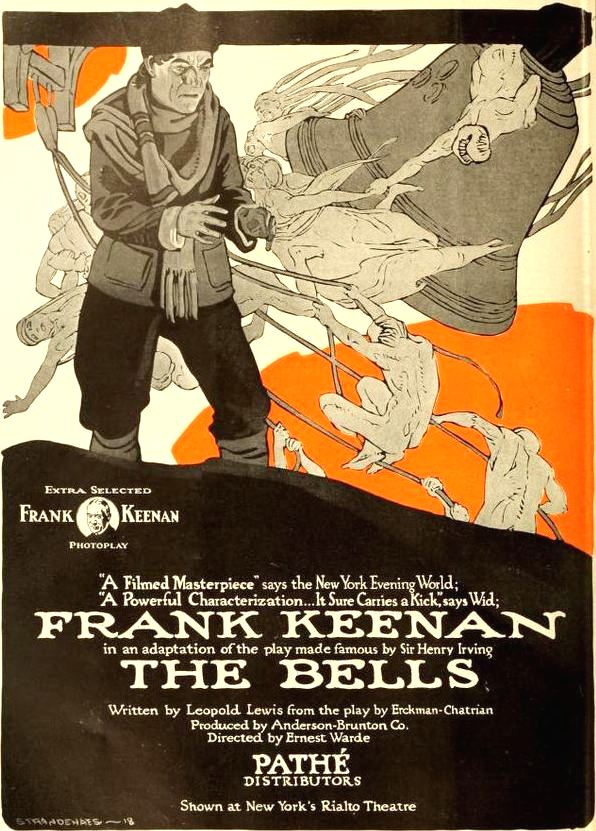
- Ad for film
- Directed by: Ernest C. Warde
- Written by: Gilson Willets (film scenario); Jack Cunningham (film scenario)
- Based on: The Bells by Emile Erckmann and Alexandre Chatrian
- Starring: Frank Keenan; Lois Wilson
- Production company: Anderson-Brunton Company
- Distributed by: Pathé Exchange
- Release date: September 15, 1918
- Running time: 5 reels
- Country: United States
- Language: Silent (English intertitles)

The Bells is a lost 1918 American silent drama film released by Pathé Exchange. It was adapted from the 1867 French play Le Juif Polonais (The Polish Jew) by Erckmann-Chatrian and an 1871 English-language version, The Bells, by Leopold Lewis. The latter was a favorite vehicle for actor Henry Irving. This silent film stars Frank Keenan and Lois Wilson. The story was remade in 1926 as The Bells with Lionel Barrymore and Boris Karloff.

== Plot ==
As reported in a film publication, Mathias, the struggling innkeeper in an Alsatian hamlet, murders a wealthy Jew who comes to spend a night at the inn in order to pay off debts and a mortgage.

The murderer is never discovered, but the season passes into local history as the "Polish Jew's winter." Mathias prospers, and years later his daughter becomes engaged to the captain of the gendarmes. Mathias prepares her dowry, and the sight of the gold coins brings again to his tortured conscience the ever-present sound of the sleigh-bells that heralded the approach of the ill-fated Jewish guest. In his sleep he dreams he is on trial and a hypnotist wrings a confession from him. In an ecstasy of fear he expires in the arms of his wife and daughter, the victim of Heaven's justice.

== Cast ==
- Frank Keenan as Mathias
- Lois Wilson as Annette
- Edward Coxen as Christian
- Carl Stockdale as Gari
- Albert R. Cody as Nickel
- Joseph J. Dowling as Lisparre
- Ida Lewis as Catherine
- Burton Law as Koveski (credited as Bert Law)

== Reception ==
Variety's review was mostly negative, praising Frank Keenan's performance as Mathias but describing the film as "tiresome" and the story as "old-fashioned."

== Censorship ==
Like many American films of the time, The Bells was subject to cuts by city and state film censorship boards. For example, the Chicago Board of Censors required a cut, in Reel 2, of the two intertitles "The Crossroads, on murder bent" and "The murder in the snow", the theft of money belt, robbing body of money, and the intertitle "Destruction of the body in the lime kiln" and throwing the body into the kiln.

== See also ==
- The Bells (Australia 1911)
- The Bells (US 1926)
- The Bells (UK 1931)
- The Burgomeister (Australia 1935)
