= Holdfast =

Holdfast most often refers to:

- Holdfast (biology), a root-like structure that anchors aquatic sessile organisms to their substrate
- Holdfast (tool), a tool used to secure a workpiece to a workbench or anvil

Holdfast or hold fast may also refer to:

== Places ==
- Holdfast, Worcestershire, a village in the Malvern Hills District in England
- Holdfast, Saskatchewan, a village in Canada

== Arts and entertainment ==
=== Music ===
- Hold Fast (album), a 2012 album, or the title song, by the Crookes
- Hold Fast: Acoustic Sessions, a 2018 album by Face to Face
- Hold Fast, a 2020 album by Stick in the Wheel
- "Hold Fast" (song), a 2006 song by MercyMe
- "Hold Fast", a 2010 song by Honor Bright from Action! Drama! Suspense!

=== Other media ===
- Hold Fast, a travel documentary film by Moxie Marlinspike
- Holdfast: Nations at War, a video game set during the Napoleonic Wars; see Napoleonic Wars in fiction

== Other uses ==
- Hold Fast, the motto of the Clan MacLeod
- Holdfast, a common name in the South of England for Sellotape
- Holdfast (artillery), a plinth or pedestal to which an anti-aircraft or coastal battery gun was fitted
- Codename for the 1962 Ceylonese coup d'état attempt

== See also ==
- Avast (disambiguation), a cognate of hold fast
- Holdfast Bay (disambiguation)
