= The Bells (play) =

1867 play by Erckmann-Chatrian

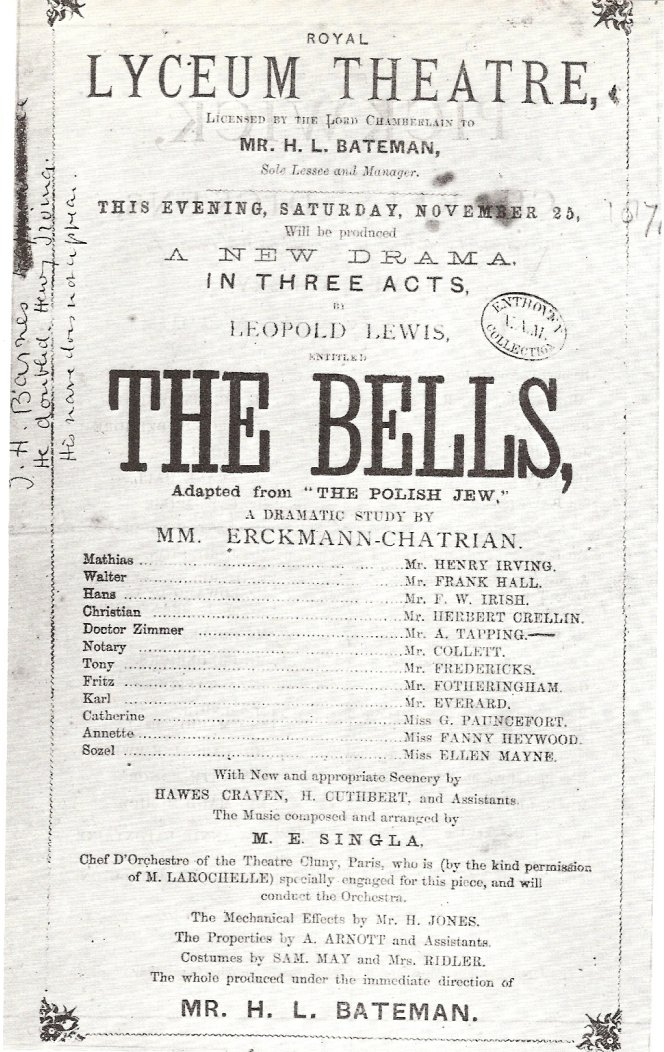
Programme for the opening night of The Bells, 25 November 1871

The Bells (French: Le Juif polonais, lit. 'The Polish Jew') is an 1867 play in three acts by Erckmann-Chatrian.

The 1871 English translation by Leopold David Lewis was one of the greatest successes of the British actor Henry Irving. It opened on 25 November 1871 at the Lyceum Theatre in London and initially ran for 151 performances. Irving was to stage the play repeatedly throughout his career, playing the role of Mathias for the last time the night before his death in 1905.

== Synopsis ==
Period – 24 & 26 December 1833.

- Act I – The Burgomaster's Inn
- Act II – The Burgomaster's Parlour
- Act III – The Burgomaster's Bedroom

The story is set in Alsace, the border country between France and Germany. Fifteen years before, on the night of 24 December 1818, the burgomaster and family man Mathias, to pay off his mortgage debt, robbed a wealthy Polish Jewish seed merchant named Koveski who had come to Mathias' inn, killing him with an axe and throwing his body into a lime kiln. Over time Mathias goes insane with guilt, and begins to hallucinate the ghost of the Polish Jew. Only the murderer and the audience, but nobody on stage, could hear the bells on the Jew's sledge jingling or see his ghostly face.

Finally, Mathias dreams that he is on trial for the murder and, confessing his guilt, is condemned to death by hanging. Waking, he tries to pull the imaginary noose from around his neck, and dies of a heart attack.

== Production history ==
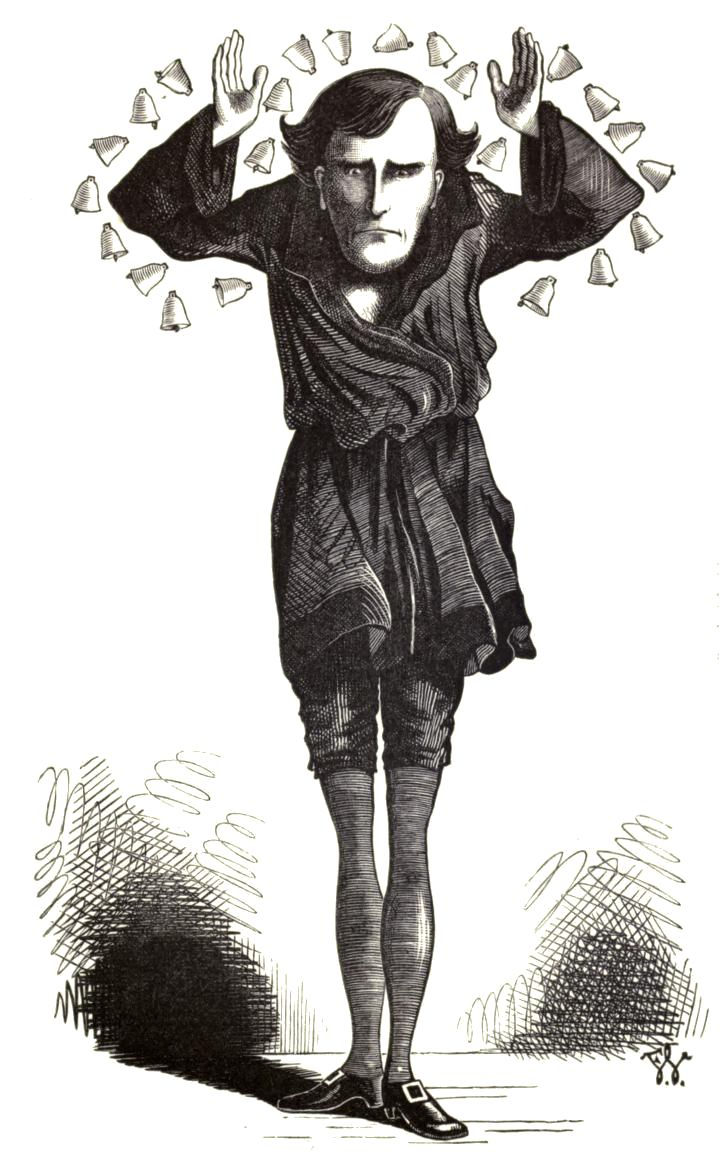
Caricature of Henry Irving in The Bells

In 1871, Leopold David Lewis began his association with the Lyceum Theatre with an engagement under the management of Hezekiah Linthicum Bateman. The fortunes of the house were at a low ebb when the tide was turned by Irving's sudden success as Mathias in The Bells, a property which Irving had found for himself. Bateman had been looking for a leading man when he saw Irving in a play, and the two discussed terms and possible roles for Irving, including a new version of The Polish Jew, a play about a man haunted by a murder he has committed. The Lyceum Theatre season opened in September 1871, and the first two plays were box office failures. By late October Bateman was facing financial ruin. Again Irving urged him to stage The Polish Jew, convinced that the play would be a dramatic and financial success. An unsuccessful version of the play was running at the Royal Alfred Theatre in Marylebone to meagre audiences, which failed to convince Bateman that another version could be a success; but Irving persuaded him and gave him a copy of The Bells, by Leopold Lewis.

The English opening night of The Bells on 25 November 1871 was held before a small audience, and during the performance a woman fainted in the stalls. The audience sat in stunned silence at the end of the play. However, they then gave the play, and Irving's performance, a great ovation.

Henry Irving as Mathias in The Bells

George R Sims later wrote for The Evening News:

"... There were plenty of stalls vacant at the Lyceum, and the author and I sat in two of them... The first part of The Bells was not very enthusiastically received, but the audience was undoubtedly held by the big scene. In the stalls there was a general agreement that Henry Irving had fulfilled the promise of dramatic intensity which he had shown in his recitation of The Dream of Eugene Aram.

The play left the first-nighters a little dazed. Old fashioned playgoers did not know what to make of it as a form of entertainment. But when the final curtain fell the audience, after a gasp or two, realised that they had witnessed the most masterly form of tragic acting that the British stage had seen for many a long day, and there was a storm of cheers. Then, still pale, still haggard, still haunted, as it were, by the terror he had so perfectly counterfeited, the actor came forward with the sort of smile that did not destroy the character of the Burgomaster or dispel the illusion of the stage."

The critics declared Irving a new star, and he was immediately established at the forefront of British drama. The play ran for 150 nights, which was an unusually long run at the time. It would prove a popular vehicle for Irving for the rest of his professional life.

Edward Gordon Craig, who saw Irving perform the play 30 times, described Irving's performance as "the finest point the craft of acting could reach". Craig added,

"The thing Irving set out to do was to show us the sorrow which slowly and remorselessly beat him down. The sorrow, which he suffers, must appeal to our hearts. Irving set out to wring our hearts, not to give a clever exhibition of antics such as a murderer would be likely to go through. Here is a strong human being who, through a moment of weakness, falls into error and for two hours becomes a criminal – does what he knows he is doing – acts deliberately but acts automatically, as though impelled by an immense force, against which no resistance is possible."

The overture and incidental music for The Bells was originally composed by Etienne Singla, Chef d'orchestre of the Théâtre Cluny in Paris for the opera Le Juif polonais in 1869. H. L. Bateman brought Singla to the Lyceum to arrange his score for The Bells, and, according to the programme, Singla conducted on the opening night. In future productions Irving deleted many of the musical themes in order to heighten the drama in various scenes.

As they drove home from the opening night of The Bells, Irving's wife, Florence, criticised his profession: "Are you going on making a fool of yourself like this all your life?" (She was then pregnant with their second son, Laurence). Irving got out from their carriage at Hyde Park Corner, walked off into the night and chose never to see her again.

Henry Irving produced the play regularly throughout his career. Other actors who have played the Burgomaster Mathias in subsequent productions include Irving's son H. B. Irving, Henry Baynton, William Haviland, Bransby Williams and John Martin-Harvey.

=== Original English cast ===
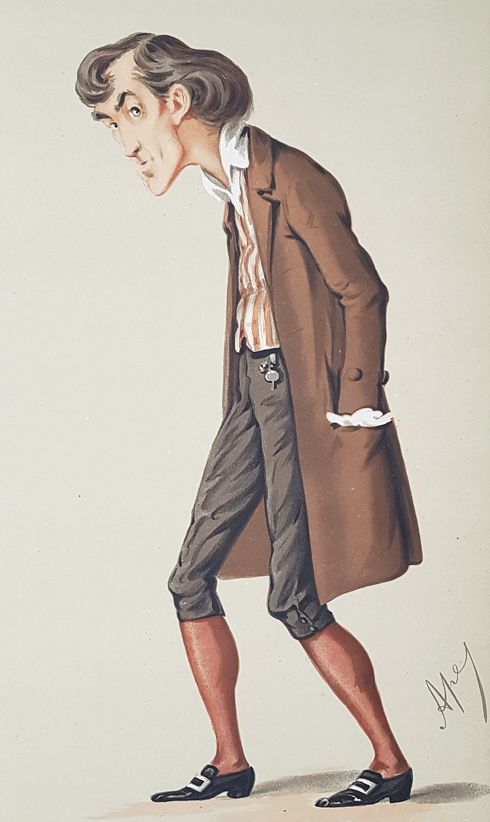
Caricature of Irving in The Bells. Vanity Fair, 19 December 1874.

- Mathias, the burgomaster – Henry Irving
- Catherine, his wife – Miss G. Pauncefort
- Annette, his daughter – Miss Fanny Heywood
- Walter, a friend of Mathias – Frank Hall
- Hans, a friend of Mathias – F W Irish
- Christian, a gendarme – Herbert Crellin
- Sozel, a servant – Miss Ellen Mayne
- Doctor Zimmer – Mr A Tapping
- Notary – Mr Collett
- Tony, Karl & Fritz, guests – Mr Fredericks, Mr Fotheringham and Mr Everard
- Villagers, Officers of the Court, Crowd

== Adaptations ==
The play was adapted into numerous film adaptations:

- Le Juif polonais, an opera in three acts by Camille Erlanger, composed to a libretto by Henri Caïn
- a 1911 Australian film directed by W. J. Lincoln
- two American films in 1913 – one directed by Oscar Apfel and the other produced by Thomas Edison
- two more versions in 1914 – one British, one American
- a 1918 American film directed by Ernest C. Warde
- a 1925 British-Belgian film (aka Le juif polonais) directed by Harry Southwell
- a 1926 Hollywood film starring Lionel Barrymore and Boris Karloff
- a 1931 British film that starred Donald Caltrop as Mathias
- The Burgomeister (1935), an Australian remake by Harry Southwell
