= Suzanne Reichenberg =

French actress (1853–1924)

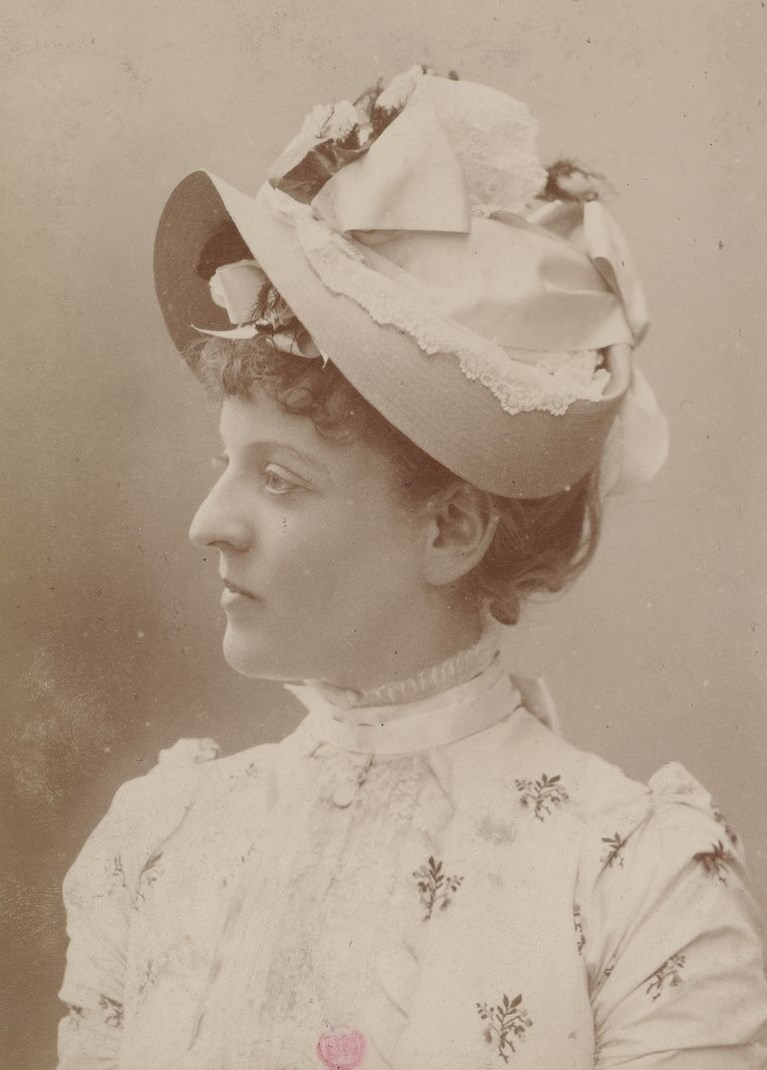
- Reichenberg's portrait by Nadar
- Born: Suzanne Angélique Charlotte Reichenberg; 7 September 1853; Paris, France
- Died: 9 March 1924 (aged 70); Paris
- Resting place: Montmartre Cemetery
- Other name: Suzette (stage name)
- Education: Conservatoire de Paris
- Occupation: Actress
- Years active: 1868-1898
- Employer: Comédie-Française
- Known for: Ingénue character
- Spouse(s): Napoléon-Pierre-Mathieu, Baron de Bourgoing (m. 1900; died 1916)
- Awards: Sociétaires of the Comédie-Française; Legion of Honour

Signature
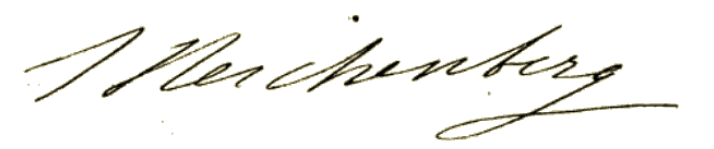

Suzanne Reichenberg (stage name, Suzette; 7 September 1853 – 9 March 1924), Baroness of Bourgoing, was a French actress. She joined the Comédie-Française on August 1, 1867, and started on December 14, 1868. She was appointed its 294th member on 1 January 1872, and became sociétaire number 309, on 9 January 1872. Reichenberg retired from the Comédie-Française on January 31, 1898. She was awarded the distinction of Chevalier (Knight), Legion of Honour.

== Early life and education ==
Suzanne Angélique Charlotte Reichenberg was born in the 17th arrondissement of Paris on September 7, 1853, to a Hungarian father, Charles Reichenberg, (1828–1859), a tailor-cutter, and a Picard mother, Aline-Joachim-Florence Bocquillon. The family lived on Rue de Rivoli, opposite the Tuileries Palace.

She was the goddaughter of Susanne Brohan, whose mother later became her lady-in-waiting. Brohan taught Suzanne La Fontaine's Fables and verses by Marceline Desbordes-Valmore. When Charles Reichenberg was sick and dying, he asked Brohan to raise his daughter. After the father's death, Suzanne Reichenberg continued to live with her mother, now on Rue Lavoisier.

At thirteen, Brohan presented Reichenberg to the Conservatoire de Paris where the teenager began her studies; at fourteen, Reichenberg obtained a second place prize in the Conservatoire's competition; at fifteen, she won the first prize at the Conservatoire.

== Career ==
Reichenberg made her acting debut in 1868 in the role of Agnès in The School for Wives at the Comédie-Française; Théophile Gautier wrote glowingly about Reichenberg the day after her debut. Boni de Castellane referred to her being "As naive as she is fanciful". She was popular in the theatre between 1870 and 1900. In the 1890s, Georges Clemenceau was close to her. Marcel Proust mentioned her in 1894 as "all graceful, dressed in pale pink and wearing a large white hat covered with large pink feathers".

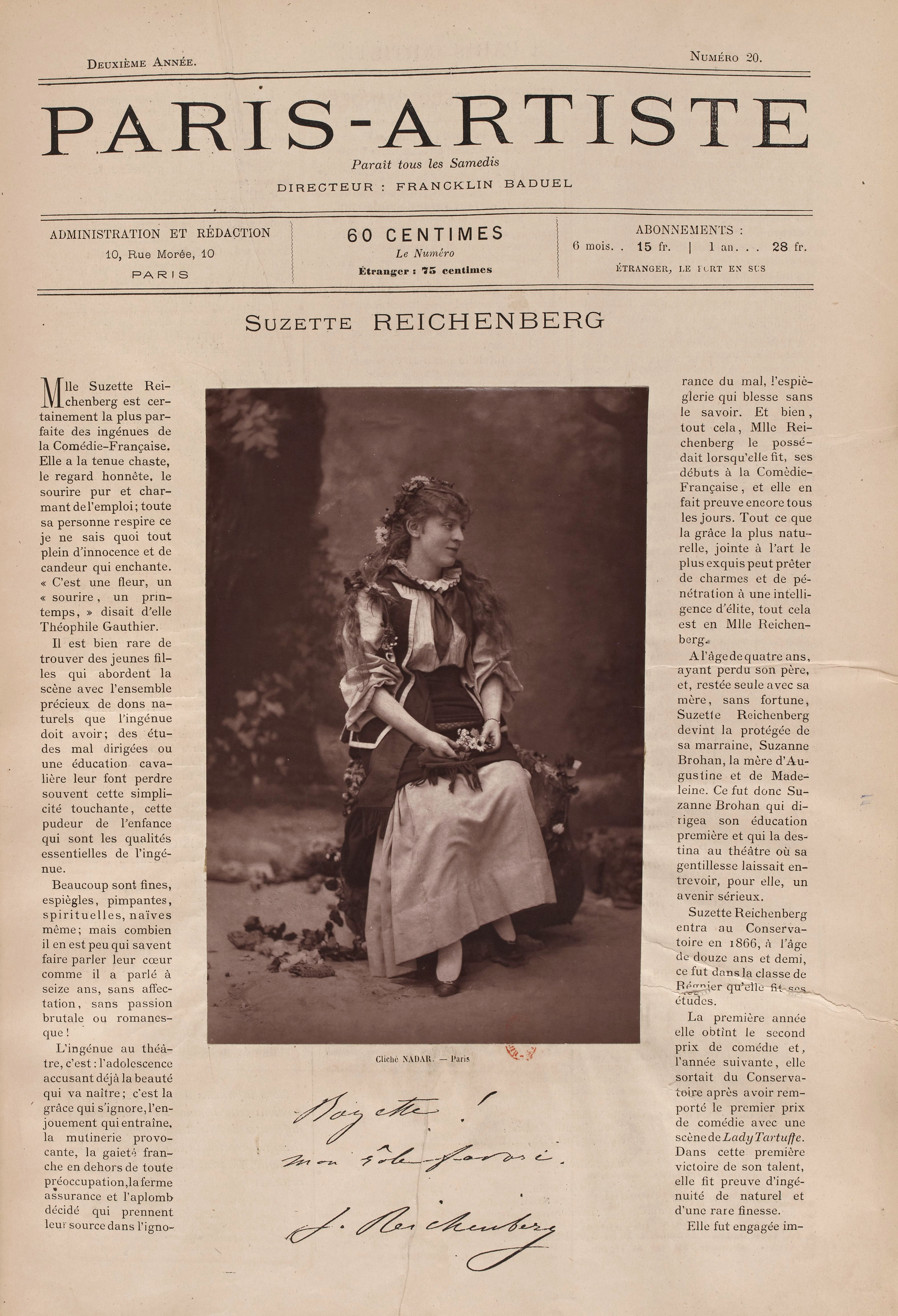
Reichenberg's photo, front page of Paris-Artiste, no. 20, 1884

In her day, she was considered to be the best ingénue character of the Comédie Française which required a character that required youth, grace, and sentiment. But Reichenberg feared her rival, Émilie Dubois. Dubois, however, was lenient. Not only did she let Reichenberg play the classical pieces, but she gave up a Léopold Laluyé sketch for her, entitled Au printemps (In the spring); "I have passed thirty," Dubois told Reichenberg; "I am Summer; you are Spring; I yield my role to you, Miss Printemps."

Reichenberg was known to be punctual in all things and with a lot of order, method and regularity. She played 500 times, without a single failure, in L'Ami Fritz and 500 times, La sous-préfète du Monde où l'on s'ennuie. These did not prevent her from reprising, on birthday evenings, or even in matinees Mariane from L'Avare qui n'a que cent lignes and Lucinde from Le Médecin malgré lui. The character of Suzel, in L'Ami Fritz, was Reichenberg's best impersonation, and she was also well received in L'Étrangère and Les Fourchambault.

Before her retirement from the stage in 1898, she undertook performances in Europe. She received a compliment from the Dowager Empress and praise from the Sultan, in the form of pearls and diamonds.

== Personal life ==
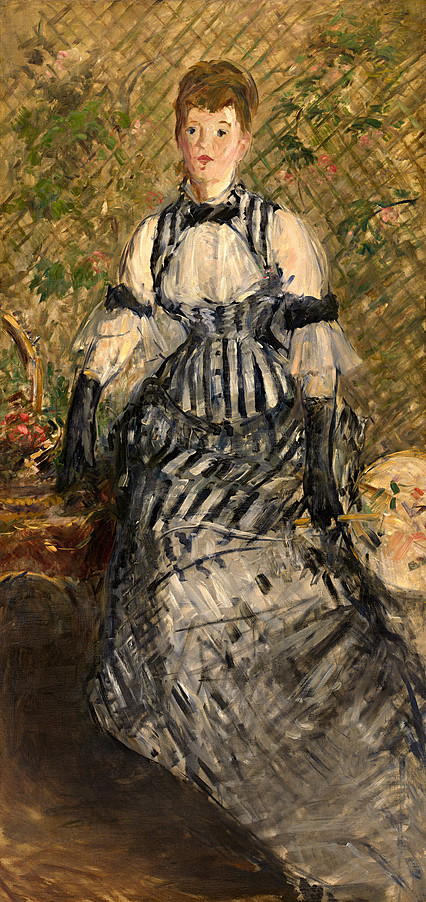
Édouard Manet's Femme en robe de soirée

There is speculation that Reichenberg was the model for the portrait painted by Édouard Manet, Woman in a striped dress, a painting which represents a type of woman, the fashionable Parisian bourgeois, with a Japanese hand fan.

The dish, Crêpes Suzette, may have been named in honour of Reichenberg, who worked professionally under the name "Suzette". The recipe was created by Auguste Escoffier, who was the chef at the Hôtel Ritz Paris before heading the kitchens at the Savoy Hotel in London. It was there that he served the Prince of Wales, the future King of England Edward VII, crepes cooked with curaçao. The Prince suggested naming the dish after Suzanne Reichenberg, the young woman who accompanied him for dessert.

In 1883, Reichenberg had a holiday home, Villa Reichenberg, built in Saint-Raphaël, Var, later named Villa Marie, by the architect Pierre Aublé.

She married Napoléon-Pierre-Mathieu, Baron de Bourgoing (1857–1916) on 12 October 1900, in the 17th arrondissement of Paris.

== Death and legacy ==
Suzanne Reichenberg died in the 17th arrondissement of Paris, on 9 March 1924. She is buried in the Montmartre Cemetery (9th division), with her parents, her daughter, Fernande-Madeleine Reichenberg, wife of Pierre-Robert Pitet, and her grandson Jacques Pitet.

Arsène Alexandre was her biographer with Suzanne Reichenberg: les ingénues au théâtre (1898).

== Theatre ==
=== Career with Comédie-Française ===
- 1868 : L'École des femmes by Molière : Agnès
- 1869 : Julie by Octave Feuillet : Cécile
- 1869 : Le Mariage de Figaro by Beaumarchais : Fanchette
- 1870 : Esther by Jean Racine : une jeune Israélite
- 1871 : Athalie by Jean Racine : Joas
- 1871 : Christiane by Edmond Gondinet : Christiane
- 1871 : Les Plaideurs by Jean Racine : Isabelle
- 1875 : Les Projets de ma tante by Henry Nicole
- 1875 : Bataille de dames by Eugène Scribe
- 1875 : Tartuffe by Molière : Marianne
- 1875 : La Grand'maman by Édouard Cadol : Alice
- 1875 : L'Ilote by Charles Monselet et Paul Arène : Fleur-de-Sauge
- 1876 : L'Ami Fritz by Émile Erckmann & Alexandre Chatrian : Suzel
- 1876 : Dom Juan ou le Festin de pierre by Molière : Mathurine
- 1878 : Les Fourchambault by Émile Augier
- 1879 : Le Mariage de Figaro by Beaumarchais : Chérubin, puis Suzanne
- 1880 : Le Bourgeois gentilhomme by Molière : Lucile
- 1886 : Un parisien by Edmond Gondinet : Geneviève
- 1886 : Hamlet, prince de Danemark according to William Shakespeare : Ophélie
- 1887 : Francillon by Alexandre Dumas : Annette
- 1887 : Vincenette by Pierre Barbier : Vincenette
- 1887 : La Souris by Édouard Pailleron : Marthe de Moisan
- 1888 : Les Femmes savantes by Molière : Henriette
- 1888 : Pepa by Henri Meilhac et Louis Ganderax : Pepa Vasquez
- 1890 : Margot by Henri Meilhac : Margot
- 1890 : La Parisienne by Henry Becque : Clotilde
- 1892 : Le Juif polonais by Émile Erckmann & Alexandre Chatrian : Annette
- 1894 : Les Romanesques by Edmond Rostand : Sylvette
- 1895 : Le Fils de l'Arétin by Henri de Bornier : Stellina
- 1896 : L'Évasion by Eugène Brieux : Mme de Cattenières
- 1897 : Mieux vaut douceur et violence by Édouard Pailleron : Cécile
- 1903 : Gringoire by Théodore de Banville

=== Other ===
- 1887 : Le Cœur de Paris, a revue with Réjane, at Paris Opera. A single performance, given to benefit the works of the Société philanthropique
