= The Burgomeister =

- Directed by: Harry Southwell
- Written by: Denzil Batchelor
- Based on: the play The Bells adapted by Leopold Lewis from the play Le Juif Polonais by Erckmann-Chatrian
- Produced by: Harry Southwell
- Starring: Janet Ramsey Johnson
- Cinematography: George Heath
- Edited by: William Shepherd
- Music by: Isador Goodman
- Production company: Film Players Corporation
- Distributed by: Scott Films
- Release date: 29 September 1935
- Running time: 56 minutes
- Country: Australia
- Language: English
- Budget: £10,000

The Burgomeister is a 1935 Australian film directed by Harry Southwell based on the 1867 play Le juif polonais (aka The Bells) by Erckmann-Chatrian, adapted into English in 1871 by Leopold Lewis, previously filmed a number of times. The Burgomeister is considered a 'substantially lost' film, with only one sequence surviving.

Southwell had performed the play in Europe, and had previously filmed it in Belgium (1925) as Le juif polonais (The Bells). This silent film version was shown in Australia in 1928.

== Cast ==
- Harry Southwell as Mathias
- Janet Ramsey Johnson as Annette
- Muriel Meredith as Catherine
- Lily Molloy as Sozel
- Stan Tolhurst as the Polish Jew
- Gabriel Toyne as Fritz
- Ross Vernon as Christian
- Harold Meade as Father Walter
- Bertie Wright as Heinrich
- Leslie Victor as Hans
- Judy Eccles as Baby Annette
- Paul Furness as hypnotist
- James Toohey as witness
- Jane Munro as Marie
- Alf Scarlett
- Reginald Riddell

== Production ==
Southwell wanted to make the 1935 remake for less than £4,000. He formed a production company in April 1935 called Film Players Corporation. Among its directors were Sir John Butters, a director of Associated Newspapers, and W.J. Bradley, K.C. and society figure George Rayner.

Production began in June 1935 at Cinesound's Bondi studios. It ended in July with a cost of £10,000.

The original music score was by Isador Goodman, and costumes by Barbara Robison. Rupert Kathner worked as art director.

The final scenes of the film were shot in the snow on Mount Kosciuszko. Cameraman George Heath worked under difficult conditions, including freezing cold and a blizzard.

== Release ==
During pre-production, RKO signed to distribute the movie in Australia and Britain. The film was refused registration under the quality clause of the New South Wales Film Quota Act.

It was previewed on 29 September 1935 but was not screened commercially. This caused the investors to lose their money, an event which was blamed for scaring Australian investors away from putting their money into local films.

A re-edited version of the film called Hypnotized screened in some country areas. In 1937, the move was released in the UK as Flames of Conscience.

== See also ==
- The Bells (Australia, 1911)
- The Bells (US, 1918)
- The Bells (US, 1926)
- The Bells (UK, 1931)
