= Marthe Chenal =

French operatic soprano

- Marthe Chenal, c. 1920
- Born: 24 August 1881; Saint-Maurice, Val-de-Marne, France
- Died: 28 January 1947 (aged 65); Paris, France
- Occupation: Singer
- Years active: 1905–1923

Marthe Chenal (French pronunciation: [maʁt ʃənal]; 24 August 1881 – 28 January 1947) was a French operatic soprano who had an active singing career between 1905 and 1923. Although she made a number of appearances with opera companies throughout the French provinces and on the international stage, her career was mainly centered at the Palais Garnier and the Opéra-Comique in Paris. She particularly excelled in the works of Jules Massenet and was an exponent of the works of Camille Erlanger.

Chenal was admired not only for her excellent singing but also her dramatic prowess, with a number of critics comparing her to the great French dramatic actress Sarah Bernhardt. A remarkably attractive woman, Chenal was dubbed by the international press as "the most beautiful woman in Paris". She was noted for her rendition of La Marseillaise. Her voice is preserved on a number of recordings made with Pathé Records in 1915.

== Biography ==
Born in Saint-Maurice, Val-de-Marne, Chenal was educated at the convent at the Basilique du Sacré-Cœur, Paris. She entered the Conservatoire de Paris in 1901 where she was initially advised by all of her teachers to pursue a career outside of music. One teacher even went as far as to suggest that she pursue a career at the Moulin Rouge. Undaunted, Chenal continued to pursue opera studies under Martini and in 1905, her final year, she won first prize in the conservatoire's singing competition.

Chenal made her professional opera debut in 1905 at the Palais Garnier as Brunehild in Ernest Reyer's Sigurd. She continued to sing in that opera house for the next three years in such roles as Elisabeth in Richard Wagner's Tannhäuser, Marguerite in Charles Gounod's Faust, Donna Anna in Wolfgang Amadeus Mozart's Don Giovanni and the title role in Jules Massenet's Ariane.

In 1908, Chenal joined the roster of principal singers at the Opéra-Comique, making her debut with the company in the title role of Camille Erlanger's Aphrodite. She sang frequently at the Opéra-Comique throughout the rest of her career, notably appearing in several world premieres with the company; including Gabriel Pierné's On ne badine pas avec l'amour, Alfred Bruneau's Le Roi Candaule, and Erlanger's La sorcière.

Between 1908-1910 Chenal made a number of lauded appearances at the Opéra de Monte-Carlo, including the title roles in Camille Saint-Saëns' Proserpine, Alexander Dargomyzhsky's Rusalka, and Giacomo Puccini's Tosca among others. She later returned to Monte Carlo in 1926 to portray the title role in Georges Bizet's Carmen.

In 1909, Chenal starred in the world premiere of Camille Erlanger's Bacchus triomphant at the Grand Théâtre de Bordeaux. The following year she returned to the Opéra National de Paris to appear in the world premiere of Georges Hüe's Le miracle. After 1910, she spent the next thirteen years performing roles at both the Palais Garnier and the Opéra-Comique. Her last opera appearance was at the Opéra-Comique in 1923 as Margared in Édouard Lalo's Le roi d'Ys.

Outside France Chenal made only a few appearances. She sang at the Manhattan Opera House in New York City a few times during her career. In 1917, she appeared at the Teatro Costanzi in Rome in the title role of Massenet's Sapho and gave a concert of French opera arias at La Scala in Milan.
