= Napoleonic Wars in fiction =

Works of fiction inspired by the Napoleonic Wars

The Napoleonic Wars were a defining event of the early 19th century, and inspired many works of fiction, from then until the present day.

- Napoleon himself wrote Clisson et Eugénie (1795), a romantic novella about a soldier and his lover, widely acknowledged as being a fictionalised account of his own relationship with Eugénie Désirée Clary.
- In January 1826 The Kaleidoscope: or, Literary and Scientific Mirror magazine published an account by Arna Cano of Moustache, a dog who had participated in various campaigns of the French army. The account may be partly fictionalised.
- Leo Tolstoy's epic novel War and Peace recounts Napoleon's wars between 1805 and 1812 (especially the disastrous 1812 invasion of Russia and subsequent retreat) from a Russian perspective.
- Stendhal's novel The Charterhouse of Parma opens with a ground-level recounting of the Battle of Waterloo and the subsequent chaotic retreat of French forces.
- Les Misérables by Victor Hugo takes place against the backdrop of the Napoleonic War and subsequent decades, and in its unabridged form contains an epic telling of the Battle of Waterloo.
- Adieu is a novella by Honoré de Balzac in which can be found a short description of the French retreat from Russia, particularly the battle of Berezina, where the fictional couple of the story are tragically separated. Years later after imprisonment, the husband returns to find his wife still in a state of utter shock and amnesia. He has the battle and their separation reenacted, hoping the memory will heal her state.
- William Makepeace Thackeray's novel Vanity Fair takes place during the 1815 Napoleonic War – one of its protagonists dies at the Battle of Waterloo. Thackeray states in Chapter XXX "We do not claim to rank among the military novelists. Our place is with the non-combatants. When the decks are cleared for action we go below and wait meekly." And indeed he presents no descriptions of military leaders, strategy, or combat; he describes anxious non-combatants waiting in Brussels for news.
- Sylvia's Lovers by Elizabeth Gaskell is set in the English home-front during the Napoleonic Wars and depicts the impressment of sailors by roving press gangs.
- The Duel, a short story by Joseph Conrad, recounts the story based on true events of two French Hussar officers who carry a long grudge and fight in duels each time they meet during the Napoleonic wars. The short story was adapted by director Ridley Scott into the 1977 Cannes Film Festival's Best First Work award-winning film The Duellists.
- Mr Midshipman Easy (1836), semi-autobiographical novel by Captain Frederick Marryat, who served as a Royal Navy officer (1806–1830) including during Napoleonic Wars, and who wrote many novels, and who was a pioneer of the Napoleonic wars sea story about the experiences of British naval officers.
- Le Colonel Chabert by Honoré de Balzac. After being severely wounded during the battle of Eylau (1807), Chabert, a famous colonel of the cuirassiers, was erroneously recorded as dead and buried unconscious with French casualties. After extricating himself from his grave and being nursed back to health by local peasants, it takes several years for him to recover. When he returns to the Paris of the Bourbon Restoration, he discovers that his "widow", a former prostitute that Chabert made rich and honourable, has married the wealthy Count Ferraud. She has also liquidated all of Chabert's belongings and pretends not to recognise her first husband. Seeking to regain his name and monies that were wrongly given away as inheritance, he hires Derville, an attorney, to win back his money and his honour.
- A poem Borodino by Mikhail Lermontov describes the Battle of Borodino from the perspective of the poet's uncle, a Russian officer.
- Alfred de Vigny's Servitude et grandeur militaires (1835) consists of three stories set during and after the Revolutionary and Napoleonic Wars. It contains autobiographical elements, notably Louis XVIII's flight to Ghent at the start of the Hundred Days, which de Vigny took part in as a junior officer. The 1998 short film A Secret Audience, directed by David Morrissey, is based on one of Vigny's three stories.
- The Count of Monte Cristo by Alexandre Dumas, père starts during the tail-end of the Napoleonic Wars. The main character, Edmond Dantès, suffers imprisonment following false accusations of Bonapartist leanings. Dumas's last novel, the unfinished Le Chevalier de Sainte-Hermine (in English, The Last Cavalier), was lost for 125 years in the archives of the Bibliothèque Nationale in Paris and was only published in 2005. It is set in the Napoleonic Wars, with a key scene occurring during the Battle of Trafalgar. In 1851 Dumas wrote the play La Barrière de Clichy, set during and after the fall of Paris in 1814.
- The novelist Jane Austen lived much of her life during the French Revolutionary and Napoleonic Wars, and two of her brothers served in the Royal Navy. Austen almost never refers to specific dates or historical events in her novels, but wartime England forms part of the general backdrop to several of them: in Pride and Prejudice (1813, but possibly written during the 1790s), the local militia (civilian volunteers) has been called up for home defence and its officers play an important role in the plot; in Mansfield Park (1814), Fanny Price's brother William is a midshipman (officer in training) in the Royal Navy; and in Persuasion (1818), Frederic Wentworth and several other characters are naval officers recently returned from service.
- Charlotte Brontë's novel Shirley (1849), set during the Napoleonic Wars, explores some of the economic effects of war on rural Yorkshire.
- Erckmann-Chatrian published Madame Thérèse, set in 1793 during the Revolutionary War, in 1863. In 1864 they published Histoire d'un conscrit de 1813, followed the following year by Waterloo.
- German writer Luise Mühlbach (Clara Mund) wrote four books (the Napoleon in Germany quartet) about the Napoleonic Wars between 1859 and 1861. The first was called Ratstatt und Jena. Napoleon and the Queen of Prussia covers the period between the Battle of Jena-Auerstädt in 1806 and the year 1810, while Napoleon and Blücher covers 1812 to Napoleon’s abdication in April 1814. The last book concerns the Congress of Vienna. She also wrote novels about Napoleon's family.
- In 1873 the Spanish realist novelist Benito Pérez Galdós published Trafalgar, the first in his 46 novel sequence Episodios Nacionales. Nine of the 10 books in the first series of Episodios Nacionales follow the adventures of a Spanish boy called Gabriel de Araceli during the Napoleonic Wars.
- Mór Jókai's Névtelen vár (1877) concerns Hungarian soldiers fighting in 1809. It was translated into English, as The Nameless Castle, in 1898.
- The Victorian and Edwardian children's writer G. A. Henty wrote a number of novels set in the French Revolution and the Napoleonic Wars. The first was The Young Buglers, A Tale of the Peninsular War (1880). Through Russian Snows: A Story of Napoleon's Retreat from Moscow (1896) features two brothers from Weymouth who, rather improbably, find themselves fighting on opposite sides during Napoleon's invasion of Russia. No Surrender! A Tale of the Rising in La Vendée (1900) is strongly hostile to the French Revolution.
- Sir Arthur Conan Doyle's Brigadier Gerard serves as a French soldier during the Napoleonic Wars.
- Herman Melville's novella Billy Budd, unfinished at the time of Melville's death in 1891 and finally published in 1924, is set at sea in 1797, during the Revolutionary War.
- Bram Stoker's short horror story The Burial of the Rats is set in a dust heap in Montrouge, Paris, in 1850, but it includes Napoleonic veterans, who are depicted in a very unflattering light. The 1995 film version does not appear to have any connection with the Napoleonic Wars.
- J.M. Barrie's 1901 play Quality Street is set in the Napoleonic wars.
- Henry Seton Merriman (Hugh Stowell Scott)'s Barlasch of the Guard (1903) is set during the retreat from Moscow. It is generally claimed to be Merriman's best work.
- Sir Max Pemberton wrote two novels concerning Napoleon's campaigns in Italy, Beatrice of Venice (1904) and Paulina (1922), and one, The Great White Army, about a military surgeon in the Grande Armée in the Russian campaign of 1812.
- Fyodor Dostoevsky's book The Idiot had a character, General Ivolgin, who witnessed and recounted his relationship with Napoleon during the Campaign of Russia.
- Roger Brook is a fictional secret agent and Napoleonic Wars Era gallant, later identified as the Chevalier de Breuc, in a series of twelve novels by Dennis Wheatley
- The Hornblower books by C.S. Forester follow the naval career of Horatio Hornblower during the Napoleonic Wars. The 1951 film Captain Horatio Hornblower starring Gregory Peck and Virginia Mayo and directed by Raoul Walsh is a film adaption based on Forester's series of novels. Also by C.S. Forester two novels of the Peninsular War in Spain and Portugal: Death to the French (1932, published in the United States under the title Rifleman Dodd), and The Gun (1933), later made into a 1957 film, The Pride and the Passion, with Cary Grant, Frank Sinatra, Sophia Loren, directed by Stanley Kramer. Sir Hugh Walpole described these two Peninsular War novels as Forester's 'best works ... remarkable for their vividness ...He writes like an eye-witness.'
- Thomas B. Costain's Ride With Me (1944) concerns a British journalist, a British general and a French emigrée during the Peninsular War and the Russian campaign.
- R.F. Delderfield, two novels about the Napoleonic Wars; Seven Men of Gascony (1949) about seven French infantrymen serving in a succession of Napoleonic campaigns, and Too Few For Drums (1964) about British soldiers cut off behind the French lines in Portugal in 1810, during the Peninsular War.
- Annemarie Selinko's Désirée (1951) is the story of Désirée Clary, who was engaged to Napoleon in 1795 and later married Jean Bernadotte. A film version starring Marlon Brando and Jean Simmons was released in 1954.
- John Dickson Carr's 1955 detective story Captain Cut-Throat concerns a serial killer in Napoleon's camp at Boulogne in 1805.
- The Aubrey–Maturin series of novels is a sequence of 20 historical novels by Patrick O'Brian portraying the rise of Jack Aubrey from Lieutenant to Rear Admiral during the Napoleonic Wars. The film Master and Commander: The Far Side of the World starring Russell Crowe and directed by Peter Weir is based on this series of books.
- The Sharpe series by Bernard Cornwell stars the character Richard Sharpe, a soldier in the British Army, who fights throughout the Napoleonic Wars.
- The Bloody Jack book series by Louis A. Meyer is set during the Second Coalition of the Napoleonic Wars, and retells many famous battles of the age. The heroine, Jacky, meets Bonaparte.
- The Napoleonic Wars provide the backdrop for The Emperor, The Victory, The Regency and The Campaigners, Volumes 11, 12, 13 and 14 respectively of The Morland Dynasty, a series of historical novels by author Cynthia Harrod-Eagles.
- The Richard Bolitho series by Alexander Kent novels portray this period of history from a naval perspective.
- G.S. Beard, author of two novels (2010) about John Fury, British naval officer during Napoleonic Wars.
- Napoleon's Blackguards, a novel by Stephen McGarry, set in Spain during the Napoleonic Wars about the travails of an elite unit of Napoleon's Irish Legion.
- Robert Challoner, author of three novels in the series about Charles Oakshott, British naval officer in Napoleonic Wars.
- David Donachie's John Pearce series about a pressed seaman who becomes a British naval officer during the French Revolution wars and Napoleonic Wars.
- Julian Stockwin's Thomas Kydd series portrays one man's journey from pressed man to Admiral in the time of the French and Napoleonic Wars
- Simon Scarrow – Napoleonic series. Rise of Napoleon and Wellington from humble beginnings to history's most remarkable and notable leaders. Four books in the series.
- The Lord Ramage series by Dudley Pope takes place during the Napoleonic Wars.
- Kenneth Bulmer, writing as Adam Hardy, wrote a series of naval historical novels about a Royal Navy officer called George Abercrombie Fox, set between 1775 and 1801.
- Gilles Lapouge wrote a novel called La Bataille de Wagram in 1986. An English translation, The Battle of Wagram, was published in 1988.
- Jeanette Winterson's 1987 novel The Passion (novel).
- Georgette Heyer's 1937 novel An Infamous Army recounts the fortunes of a family in the run up to, and during the course of, the Battle of Waterloo. Heyer's novel is noted for its meticulous research on the progress of the battle, combining her noted period romance writing with her detailed research into regency history.
- French writer Max Gallo wrote a series of four novels about the Emperor, The Napoleon Quartet, published in 1997 (with English translations published in 2004). They are Le Chant du depart (The Song of Departure), Le Soleil d’Austerlitz (The Sun of Austerlitz), L’Empereur des rois (The Emperor of Kings) and L’Immortel de Sainte-Hélène (The Immortal of Saint Helena).
- The Battle (French: La Bataille) is a historical novel by the French author Patrick Rambaud that was first published in 1997 and again in English in 2000. The book describes the 1809 Battle of Aspern-Essling between the French Empire under Napoleon and the Austrian Empire. The novel was awarded the Prix Goncourt and the Grand Prix du roman de l'Académie française for 1997. La Bataille is the first book of a trilogy by Rambaud about the decline of Napoleon, describing his first personal defeat in a European battle; the other two books cover Napoleon’s defeat in Russia in The Retreat and his banishment at Elba in Napoleon’s Exile. La Bataille has been adapted into a three volume bande dessinée by Ivan Gil.
- Michel Peyramaure's Lavalette, grenadier d'Égypte (1998) is a novel about Napoleon's Egyptian Campaign. The same author's Les prisonniers de Cabrera (2009) is about the experiences of French prisoners deported by the Spanish to the island of Cabrera, near Majorca, during the Peninsular War.
- Allan Mallinson's A Close Run Thing (1999) is about the Battle of Waterloo.
- In Jasper Kent's novel Twelve, 1812 Russian Invasion serves as a base story for the book. Later books from The Danilov Quintet, this war is constantly mentioned.
- The Fighting Sail series by Alaric Bond portrays life and action aboard Royal Naval vessels during the Revolutionary and Napoleonic Wars. From the lower decks to the quarterdeck Bond's detailed settings are realistic. Narratives are told not just from a commissioned officer's point of view but include varied perspectives, including warranted officers, ordinary and able seamen, marines, supernumeraries, and women aboard presenting a broader, more complete picture of the Georgian Navy.
- French psychiatrist and writer Armand Cabasson has published three detective novels set between 1809 and 1814 in the Napoleonic Wars. Collectively known as Les Enquêtes de Quentin Margont, they consist of Les Proies de l’officier (2002), Chasse au loup (2005) and La Mémoire des flammes (2006). The English translations are The Officer's Prey, Wolf Hunt and Memory of Flames (all published by Gallic Books in 2011). The main character, Quentin Margont, is an officer in the 18th Line Infantry. Cabasson is descended from Jean-Quenin Bremont, a medical officer in Napoleon's army who features as a character in the books.
- The French journalist Laurent Joffrin has written three detective novels (Les aventures de Donatien Lachance) set under Napoleon, the first being L'Énigme de la rue Saint Nicaise (2010), about the machine infernale bomb attempt on Bonaparte's life in 1800.
- Former French president Valéry Giscard d'Estaing's counterfactual historical novel La Victoire de la Grande Armée (Plon, 2010) has Napoleon immediately vacating Moscow after its capture in 1812, thus avoiding the disastrous retreat from that city in the depth of winter and forcing the Russians to meet him in battle on his terms. The main character is a fictitious French general, François Beille.
- David Ebsworth's The Last Campaign of Marianne Tambour: A Novel of Waterloo (2014) is about a French cantinière.
- Jean-Paul Tapie has written a series of five novels, primarily for gay readers, called Les bâtards de l'Empire, set in the French Revolution and the Napoleonic Wars. The first, L'ombre de la Terreur, was published in 2015.
- N. J. Slater's An Agent of the King (2013) and Peninsular Spy (2014) are both set during the wars against Napoleon.
- Martin McDowell's 105th Foot, The Prince of Wales Own Wessex Regiment series is set in the Napoleonic Wars.
- The ancient historian Adrian Goldsworthy has written six novels about the fictional 106th Foot, "a new regiment staffed by young gentlemen who know nothing of war", beginning with True Soldier Gentlemen (2011).
- Robert Wilton's Treason's Tide (Corvus, 2011) is an espionage tale set in 1805. It is the first of four concerning the fictional English Comptrollerate-General for Scrutiny and Survey. Another book in the series is set in 1792 (the other two are set in the seventeenth and twentieth centuries).
- David Cook has written a number of novels set in the Napoleonic Wars, collectively known as The Soldier Chronicles. The first, Liberty or Death, was published in 2014.
- Emma Osborne's Angel of Waterloo: Jane Bennet, War Nurse: A Pride and Prejudice Variation Novel (Independently published, 2017) is set during the Napoleonic Wars (despite the anachronistic red cross on the cover!)
- David McDine has written four sea stories about a Royal Navy officer, Lieutenant Oliver Anson, set in the Napoleonic Wars. The first, The Normandy Privateer, was published in 2017. The others are Strike the Red Flag, Dead Man's Island and A Stormy Peace (this last published in 2019). The first three have also been published (Kindle only) as the Blood in the Water Trilogy (2018) .
- Jean-Pierre Rey's Moi, Moustache, chien-soldat, héros des guerres napoléoniennes (Glyphe, 2019) is the 'autobiography' of a real dog, Moustache, who was present at several battles and killed at Badajoz in 1812. The book won the 2019 Prix Fernand Méry, awarded yearly to a literary work concerning animals (and named after a pioneering vet).
- Jonathan Spencer has written two espionage books set in 1798, Napoleon's Run and Lords of the Nile (The William John Hazzard Series, both 2020).
- Nick S. Thomas has written a series of books about Captain James Craven, "a prizefighter and rogue", set in the Peninsular War. The first, Craven's War: A Call to Arms, was published in August 2020.
- Australian novelist Jackie French's The Angel of Waterloo (HarperCollins, 2020) is about a surgeon's daughter who helps the wounded during the Napoleonic Wars and then travels to Australia.
- Jay Worrall has written a trilogy of novels about an officer on a British warship during the Napoleonic Wars. The first is Sails on the Horizon (Canelo Adventure, 2020), followed by Any Approaching Enemy and A Sea unto Itself.
- J.D. Davies has begun a series about a French sailor in the Revolutionary War, The Philippe Kermovant Thrillers. The first, beginning in 1793, is called Sailor of Liberty (Canelo Adventure, 2023).
- Ben Kane's Napoleon's Spy (Orion, 2023) concerns a Matthieu Carrey, a half-French, half-English soldier in the Grande Armée during Napoleon's invasion of Russia in 1812.

== Science fiction and fantasy ==
- Edmond About's L'Homme à l'oreille cassée (1862) is a work of fantastic fiction about a Napoleonic officer who is placed in suspended animation in 1813 and revived in 1859. It has been filmed several times, notably by Robert Boudrioz in 1934.
- Bryan Talbot's graphic novel Grandville is set in an alternate history in which France won the Napoleonic War, invaded Britain and guillotined the British royal family.
- The Temeraire series by Naomi Novik takes place in alternate-universe Napoleonic Wars where dragons exist and serve in combat.
- Susanna Clarke's historical fantasy novel, Jonathan Strange & Mr. Norrell, takes place during the Napoleonic Wars. Much of the plot is driven by Mr. Norrell's successful campaign to convince the British government that magic can be employed to prosecute the Peninsular War.

== Drama ==
- In 1851 Alexandre Dumas, père wrote the play La Barrière de Clichy, set during and after the fall of Paris in 1814.
- Edmond Rostand's L'Aiglon (premiered 1900), about Napoleon's son The King of Rome, includes a discussion about Napoleon's abdication in 1814.
- Thomas Hardy's The Dynasts – perhaps more "fact" than "fiction" – is a "closet drama" encompassing the entire scope of the Napoleonic Wars, written by Hardy during the Edwardian Era.

== Video games ==
- Napoleon: Total War is a strategy game focusing on the Napoleonic Wars, allowing the player to fight real-time battles.
- Napoleonics is a 1993 computer game by Dr. Peter Turcan, based on three battles, Austerlitz, Borodino and Waterloo. The games were developed in the 1980s.
- Fields of Glory (1993) is a computer game based on the Waterloo campaign. It includes a useful database on the units involved.
- David Kershaw's DK Simulations have produced two games for mobile devices, Napoleonics: Quatre Bras and Napoleonics: Waterloo.
- Historia Battles Napoleon, and the more advanced Res Militaria Napoleon, are computer war games designed by Vincenzo Pirrottina covering a number of major battles of the period, ranging from Marengo to Waterloo (there are also a couple of naval battles, though these are very unrealistic).
- Mount & Blade: Warband is a medieval roleplaying game, that includes an expansion themed to Napoleonic Wars.
- Holdfast: Nations at War is an online multiplayer shooter set during the Napoleonic era, allowing the player to take part in battles on land and sea.
- Hexwar Games, based in Scotland, produce computer games on the Peninsular War, Napoleon's Russian campaign and Waterloo, as well as the War of 1812 between Britain and the USA. The games can be played on various operating systems, including iPhone and Android.
