= L'Aube rouge =

L'Aube rouge may refer to:

- L'Aube rouge (novel), a 1925 Malagasy novel by Jean-Joseph Rabearivelo
- L'Aube rouge (opera), a 1911 French opera
