= La Sorcière =

La Sorcière (French for "The Sorceress" or "The Witch") may refer to:

- Satanism and Witchcraft (book), an 1862 book by Jules Michelet
  - Belladonna of Sadness, a 1973 Japanese film directed by Eiichi Yamamoto
- La Sorcière, a 1903 play by Victorien Sardou
  - La Sorcière (opera), a 1912 opera by Camille Erlanger
- La Sorcière (film), a 1956 French-Swedish film directed by André Michel
- The Witches' Sabbath, a 1988 Italian-French film directed by Marco Bellocchio
- "La Sorcière", an episode of the television series Ciné si

== See also ==
- Sorcière (privateer), French and British privateer ships that sailed during the Napoleonic Wars
