= Karel Weis =

Czech composer

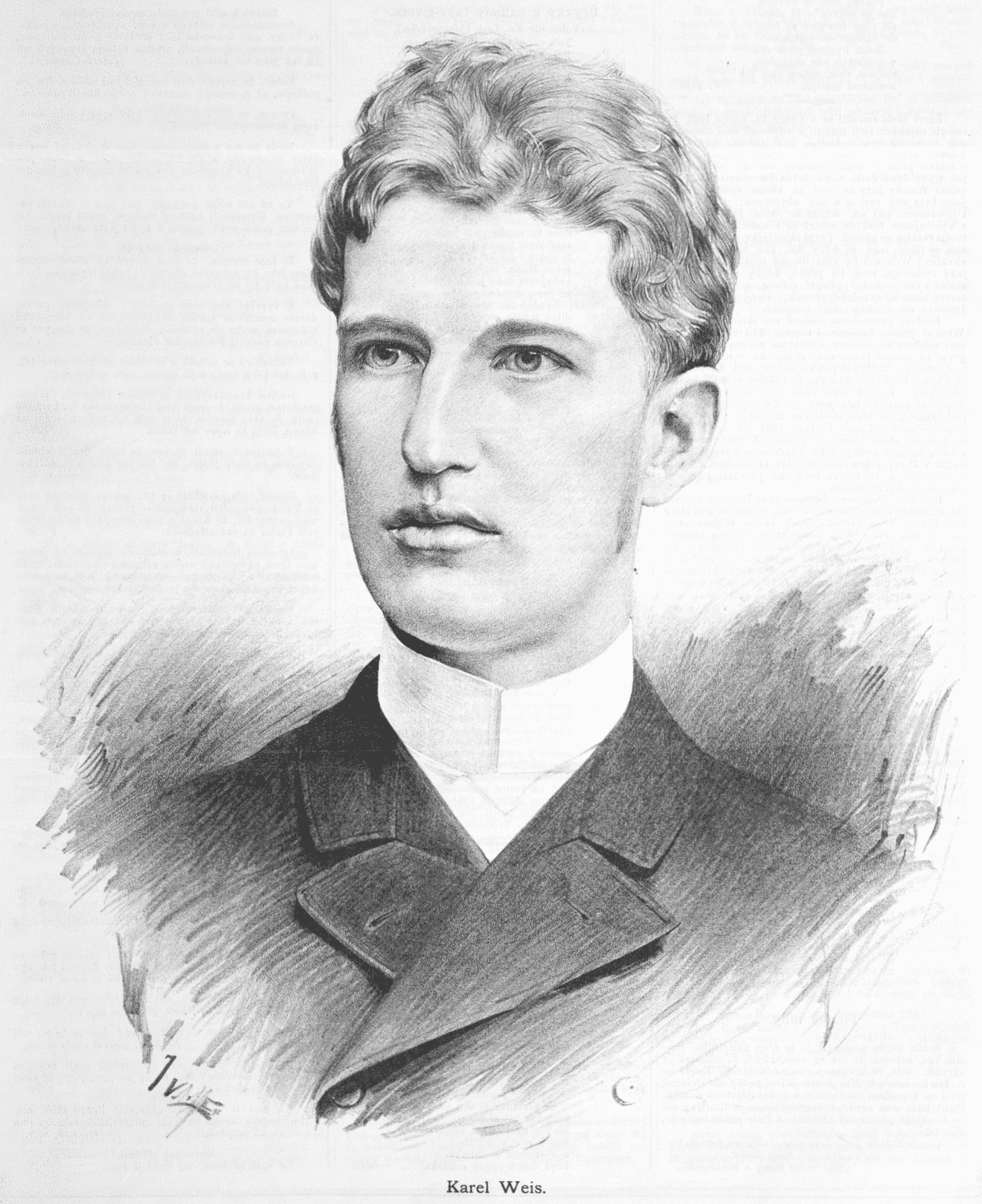
Karel Weis

Karel Weis (13 February 1862, in Prague – 4 April 1944, in Prague) was a Czech composer and musicologist.

Weis studied at the Prague Conservatory; amongst his teachers was Antonín Bennewitz. He also took private lessons with Zdeněk Fibich.

He was for some years a violinist at the Prague National Theatre, and later conducted opera in Prague and Brno. He also acted as organist. Between 1928 and 1941, he published a fifteen volume collection of folk songs.

Among his many compositions are eleven operas, (three in Czech, and eight, of which six are operettas, in German), five of which premiered at the Prague State Opera. Czech nationalists however criticised him for setting German texts.

== Operas (partial listing) ==
- Viola (1892)
- Der polnische Jude (1901) (on the same plot as Camille Erlanger's 1900 opera Le Juif polonais).
- Die Dorfmusikanten (1905)
- Der Revisor (1907)
- Utok na mlýn (1912)
- Blizenci (1917)
- Lesetinský kovár (1920)
- Bojárska nevesta (1943)
