= La Légende de Saint-Julien L'hospitalier (opera) =

La Légende de Saint-Julien L’hospitalier is an 1897 opera by Camille Erlanger based on the story of the same name by Gustave Flaubert. It was Erlanger's first opera, and following a concert performance at the conservatoire in 1894 was produced at the Opera-comique, Paris, in 1897.

== Recording ==
- Lucien Lovano, Jean Giraudeau, Pierre Germain, Christine Cloez, Pierre Rol, Nadine Sauterreau, Orchestre de Radio-Lyrique de Paris, Tony Aubin AAD, 1954
