= Charles Birkin =

English writer and editor

Sir Charles Lloyd Birkin, Bt
- Born: 24 September 1907
- Died: 1985 (aged 77–78)
- Occupations: short story writer, editor
- Writing career
- Pen name: Charles Lloyd
- Period: 1932–1970
- Genre: Horror fiction
- Notable work: "The Smell of Evil"

Sir Charles Lloyd Birkin, 5th Baronet (24 September 1907 – 1985) was an English writer of horror short stories and the editor of the Creeps Library of anthologies. Typically working under the pseudonym Charles Lloyd, Birkin's tales tended towards the conte cruels rather than supernatural fiction, although he did write some ghost stories.

== Quotes regarding ==
In the 1960s one author was almost solely responsible for keeping the horror genre alive in Britain, Sir Charles Birkin.

— John Pelan, Darkside Press/Midnight House on-line

The stories of Charles Birkin, however, are not for the squeamish. Be warned, if you are at all sensitive, leave him well alone. He deals unflinchingly with such subjects as murder, rape, concentration camps, patricide, mutilation and torture.

— Hugh Lamb, introduction to "Marjorie's On Starlight" from A Wave Of Fear (W. H. Allen Ltd, 1973)

What most marks his tales is the predictable nastiness of their consclusions...Doom arrives with monotonous regularity...For many readers, this genteelly tricked-up sadism was what horror was all about.

— T.E.D. Klein, entry on Birkin in The Penguin Encyclopedia of Horror and the Supernatural Viking Penguin 1986

== Biography ==
Birkin was the son of Colonel Charles Wilfred Birkin and Claire Howe, the daughter of Alexander Howe. Freda Dudley Ward was a sister. He was educated at Eton College and was later employed by the publisher Philip Allan to anonymously edit the Creeps horror story anthologies, the first which appeared in 1932. Authors anthologized in the Creeps series included H. Russell Wakefield, Tod Robbins, H. D. Everett and Elliott O'Donnell. Birkin included stories of his own in most of these volumes (under the pseudonym "Charles Lloyd"), these being later collected as Devil's Spawn (1936). According to E.F. Bleiler, in the Creeps series "editorial stress was on fairly low-brow stories of horror and sadism, although stories by H. Russell Wakefield helped to raise the level of individual volumes." He succeeded his uncle as 5th Baronet Birkin in 1942. During the Second World War he served in the Sherwood Foresters. The first telegraphed report of the D-Day landings in Normandy, sent by Roger Greene of the Associated press, was received in New York June 8, 1944. Greene wrote: "My escorting officer, Sir Charles Birkin, was slightly wounded three times in the first 15 minutes ashore and three men were killed within five feet of me...."

After a long hiatus, Birkin resumed writing in 1960, following a return to London, and two new stories appeared in Dennis Wheatley's anthologies Quiver of Horror (1964) and Shafts of Fear (1964). This was followed by eight collections of original Birkin stories, beginning with The Kiss of Death (1964) and ending with Spawn of Satan (1970). This last volume was published in the US only. Birkin's work is much in the tradition of the conte cruel and the grand guignol.

From 1970 to 1974 he lived in Cyprus which he fled after getting caught up in the violence following the Turkish invasion. His short story A Low Profile (1977) reflects his experiences there. He married Australian actress Janet Ramsey Johnson, the daughter of Peter Johnson, and had a two daughters and a son, John Birkin. John Birkin became known as a director of many notable British television comedies including Mr. Bean, French and Saunders, and Harry Enfield's Television Programme. He and his wife spent their later years in Sulby, Isle of Man. Birkin died in 1985.

Birkin's short stories have been estimated as numbering over one hundred.

== Bibliography ==
=== Short story collections ===
- Devil's Spawn (Philip Allan, 1936). Contains:
  - "Old Mrs. Strathers" (first published 1933)
  - "Shelter" (first published 1934)
  - "The Cockroach" (first published 1934)
  - "The Terror on Tobit" (first published 1933)
  - "The Last Night" (first published 1932)
  - "An Eye for an Eye" (first published 1932)
  - "Henri Larne" (first published 1935)
  - "Havelock's Farm"
  - "The Harlem Horror" (first published 1932)
  - "A Poem and a Bunch of Roses" (first published 1933)
  - "Obsession" (first published 1934)
  - "The Happy Dancers" (first published 1933)
  - "The Actor's Story" (first published 1933)
  - "Special Diet" (first published 1933)
  - "Premiere"
  - "Angela"
- The Kiss of Death and Other Horror Stories (Tandem, 1964; rpt. Award, 1967). Introduction by Dennis Wheatley. Contains:
  - "The Kiss of Death"
  - "The Hens"
  - "Les Belles Dames Sans Merci"
  - " "The New Ones" "
  - "The Mouse Hole"
  - "Fairy Dust"
  - " "Some New Pleasures Prove" "
  - "The Kennel"
  - "Mon Ami, Pierrot"
  - "The Mutation"
  - "Fine Needlework"
  - "The Hitch"
  - "The Three Monkeys"
  - "Malleus Maleficarum"
- The Smell of Evil (Tandem, 1965; rpt. Award, 1969 and second printing 1975). Introduction by Dennis Wheatley. Contains:
  - "The Smell of Evil"
  - "Text for Today"
  - "The Godmothers"
  - "Green Fingers"
  - "Ballet Nègre"
  - "The Lesson"
  - " "Is Anyone There?" "
  - "The Serum of Doctor White"
  - " "Dance, Little Lady" "
  - "Little Boy Blue"
  - "The Cornered Beast"
  - "The Interloper"
  - "The Cross"
- Where Terror Stalked and Other Horror Stories (Tandem, 1966). Contains:
  - "Where Terror Stalked"
  - "Old Mrs. Strathers" (first published 1933)
  - "New Faces"
  - "Paris Pilgrimage"
  - "Obsession" (first published 1934)
  - "The Harlem Horror" (first published 1932)
  - " "Bring Back My Bonny" "
  - "Softly...Softly"
  - "The Belt"
  - "Shelter" (first published 1934)
  - "The Orphanage"
  - " "Gran" "
  - "No More for Mary"
- My Name Is Death and Other New Tales of Horror (Panther, 1966; rpt. Award, 1970). Contains:
  - "My Name is Death" (first published as "The Terror on Tobit" 1933 )
  - "Kitty Fisher"
  - "King of the Castle"
  - "Parlez Moi d'Amour"
  - "Who's Your Lady Friend?"
  - "The Finger of Fear"
  - "Hosanna!"
  - "Hard to Get"
- Dark Menace (Tandem, 1968). Contains:
  - "The Jungle"
  - "S.O.S."
  - "Happy As Larry"
  - "Dark Menace"
  - "T-I-M"
  - "The Life Giver"
  - "Don't Ever Leave Me"
  - "The Yellow Dressing Gown"
  - "Waiting for Trains"
  - "The Lord God Made Them All"
  - "The Accessory"
  - "Simple Simon"
  - "Siren Song"
- So Pale, So Cold, So Fair (Tandem, 1970). Contains:
  - " "So Pale, So Cold, So Fair" "
  - "The Godsend"
  - "Rover"
  - "Circle of Children"
  - "Lot's Wife"
  - "Gideon"
  - "The Road"
  - "A Haunting Beauty"
  - "Lords of the Refuge"
- Spawn of Satan (Award, 1970)
  - "Spawn of Satan"
  - "Wedding Presents"
  - "Traces of Lipstick"
  - "A Lovely Bunch of Coconuts"
  - "Soeur Celeste"
  - "A Right to Know" (first published 1964)
  - "The New Dress"
  - "The Beautiful People"
  - "Child's Play"
- A Haunting Beauty (Midnight House, 2000; post-humous "Best of..." collection, limited 450 copies) Introduction - Mike Ashley. Contains:
  - "Little Boy Blue"
  - "The Mousehole"
  - "Some New Pleasures Prove"
  - "King Of The Castle"
  - "Waiting For Trains"
  - "Lords Of The Refuge"
  - "Ballet Nègre"
  - "The Smell of Evil"
  - "Text For Today"
  - "A Right To Know"
  - "Fairy Dust"
  - "Hosanna!"
  - "The Horror On Tobit"
  - "A Haunting Beauty."
- The Harlem Horror (Midnight House, 2002; post-humous "Best of..." collection, limited 450 copies) Introduction - John Pelan. Contains:
  - "The Harlem Horror"
  - "A Poem And A Bunch of Roses"
  - "Don't Ever Leave Me"
  - "The Godsend"
  - "A Lovely Bunch Of Coconuts"
  - "The Kiss Of Death"
  - "The Belt"
  - "Dance Little Lady"
  - "Old Mrs. Strathers"
  - "The Beautiful People"
  - "T-I-M"
  - "The Hitch"
  - "Green Fingers"
  - "Special Diet"
  - "Shelter"
- "Ballet Nègre" published in Zombies! Zombies! Zombies! (Otto Penzler / Black Lizard, 2011)
- "A Lovely Bunch of Coconuts" published in The Century's Best Horror Fiction (Cemetery Dance Publications, 2012. Editor: John Pelan) to represent the best horror short story of 1964.
- The Smell of Evil (Valancourt Books, 2013). Introduction by John Llewellyn Probert. Contains:
  - "The Smell of Evil"
  - "Text for Today"
  - "The Godmothers"
  - "Green Fingers"
  - "Ballet Nègre"
  - "The Lesson"
  - " "Is Anyone There?" "
  - "The Serum of Doctor White"
  - " "Dance, Little Lady" "
  - "Little Boy Blue"
  - "The Cornered Beast"
  - "The Interloper"
  - "The Cross"
- Devil's Spawn (Valancourt Books, 2015). Contains:
  - "Old Mrs. Strathers" (first published 1933)
  - "Shelter" (first published 1934)
  - "The Cockroach" (first published 1934)
  - "The Terror on Tobit" (first published 1933)
  - "The Last Night" (first published 1932)
  - "An Eye for an Eye" (first published 1932)
  - "Henri Larne" (first published 1935)
  - "Havelock's Farm"
  - "The Harlem Horror" (first published 1932)
  - "A Poem and a Bunch of Roses" (first published 1933)
  - "Obsession" (first published 1934)
  - "The Happy Dancers" (first published 1933)
  - "The Actor's Story" (first published 1933)
  - "Special Diet" (first published 1933)
  - "Premiere"
  - "Angela"
- “Meeting in Athens” - a dramatisation of “So Pale, So Cold, So Fair” - broadcast by BBC Radio 4 Vintage Horror Series - The Price of Fear (2018). Box set (2021). First broadcast by BBC World Service, 22 September 1973.
- "The Terror on Tobit" published in The Valancourt Book of Horror Stories Vol. 1 (Valancourt Books, edited by James D. Jenkins and Ryan Cagle, 2023)
- "A Lovely Bunch of Coconuts" published in Fears (Tachyon Publications, edited by Ellen Datlow, 2024)
- “The Harlem Horror” published in All The Fear of the Fair (British Library Tales of the Weird, edited by Edward Parnell, 2025)

=== Anthologies edited ===
- Creeps Philip Allan, (1932)
- Shudders Philip Allan, (1932)
- Shivers Philip Allan, (1933)
- Horrors Philip Allan, (1933)
- Terrors Philip Allan, (1933)
- Quakes Philip Allan, (1933)
- Nightmares Philip Allan, (1933)
- Monsters (Philip Allan, 1934)
- Panics Philip Allan, (1934)
- Powers of Darkness Philip Allan, (1934)
- Thrills Philip Allan, (1935)
- Tales of Fear Philip Allan, (1935)
- The Creeps Omnibus Philip Allan, (1935)
- Tales of Death Philip Allan], (1936)
- Tales of Dread Philip Allan, (1936)
- The Tandem Book of Ghost Stories (Tandem, 1965) rpt. as The Haunted Dancers (Paperback Library, 1967)
- The Tandem Book of Horror Stories (Tandem, 1965) rpt. as The Witch-Baiter (Paperback Library, 1967)

== Uncollected short stories ==
In December 2017, editor and genre historian Johnny Mains, revealed the existence of 13 'new' Birkin tales.

- "Insult to Injury" (1936)
- "Enterprise" (1936)
- "Reprise" (1937)
- "Déjeuner" (1938)
- "Psychical Research" (1939)
- "Paul Saltpeter's Party" (1939)
- "Faites Vos Jeux" (1939)
- "Happy Christmas" (1939)
- "Morning Shopping" (1939)
- "The Stricken Heart" (1940)
- "Point of View" (1940)
- "She Was That Sort of Lady" (1940)
- "Wrong Number" (1940)

It is Mains' aim to have these published in a standalone collection.

== See also ==
- List of horror fiction authors

Baronetage of the United Kingdom
Preceded by Alexander Birkin	Baronet (of Ruddington Grange); 1942–1985	Succeeded by John Birkin
