= Holdfast Bay (disambiguation) =

Holdfast Bay is a bay in South Australia.

Holdfast Bay may also refer to.

- City of Holdfast Bay, a local government area in South Australia
- Holdfast Bay Handicap, a road race held in South Australia
- Holdfast Bay railway line, a former rail service in South Australia

== See also ==
- Holdfast (disambiguation)
