= Madame Thérèse =

Novel by Émile Erckmann and Alexandre Chatrian

Madame Thérèse is a novel jointly written by French authors Émile Erckmann and Alexandre Chatrian. It deals with the topics of the French Revolution and the resulting social upheaval, destruction caused by war, the formation of the French First Republic, the ideals of justice and equality among classes, and friendship and devotion. The book was first published in French in 1863. It was translated into English and published under the title Madame Thérèse or The volunteers of '92 by Charles Scribner and Company in 1889.

== Plot ==
The book is told through the eyes of a young boy, Fritz, who lives with his uncle Jacob and housekeeper Lisa in a small village called Anstatt, near the present-day German towns of Kaiserlautern and Landau. After Fritz was orphaned he was adopted by his uncle, who is a doctor for the village and surrounding areas. One day in November 1793, the village awakens to find the French Republican army, who go house-to-house searching for food and supplies for their battalion. The army Colonel comes to doctor Jacob's house, where his men start baking bread for their soldiers. It is here that little Fritz, doctor Jacob and their housekeeper first meet Thérèse, who is a cantinière travelling with the French battalion along with her little twelve-year-old brother Jean. The Colonel and the Republican army personnel do not use formal titles such as 'Madame' or 'Monsieur' when speaking to each other; instead, they address each other mutually using only the salutation 'citizen'.

Later during the same day, a battle ensues in the village between the French Republicans and the defending armies of the Prussian and Austrian rulers. Fritz witnesses the bloody battle with his own eyes and sees firsthand the loss of lives and destruction of property that war brings. The Republican army is outnumbered and they realise they have to retreat. As the soldiers are departing, they quickly set up a barricade of stolen furniture and straw to block the street and then light it on fire, which soon spreads to nearby houses. Several other Austrian battalions pass through the village throughout the day and the accompanying army doctors and ambulances collect the wounded soldiers who are still alive. The village residents are left with putting out the fire and burying the soldiers who were killed. As the local undertaker and his men are carting away the dead bodies for burial, it is discovered that the cantinière Thérèse, who was wounded and is lying unconscious among the dead, is still alive also. She is rescued by doctor Jacob, who takes her to his house and with the help of friends performs an operation that removes a bullet from her shoulder. After several days, Thérèse regains consciousness. She continues to live and recuperate in doctor Jacob's house along with her poodle dog Scipio, who becomes a good friend to Fritz. As time passes, Thérèse becomes well-acquainted with and respected by the members of doctor Jacob's household and his close friends. The relationship that develops between them, as well as the turn of events on the military front, eventually culminates in her marriage to doctor Jacob, the victory of the Republican army over the Prussian forces, and the joyful reunion of Thérèse with her little brother Jean. The reader is left with the impression of a moral victory of the French Republican cause due to their ascribed ideals of social justice, fairness, and equality among classes as personified by the good-natured and kind Thérèse.

== Adaptations ==
The novel was adapted by Chatrian into a play in five acts and performed in the Théâtre du Châtelet on October 9, 1882. It was also adapted into an illustrated series published in 25 parts by the newspaper Libération in 1949.

== Quotes ==
For the first time, I fully understood what death is; these men that I had seen two minutes before, full of life and strength, charging their enemies with fury, and rushing forward like wolves, lay there, pell-mell, senseless as the stones of the street. (Chapter III)

"Behold what war is, Fritz; -look, and remember! Yes, this is war; death and destruction, fury and hatred, disregard of all human feelings. ...here it is man himself, who decrees misery to his kind, spreads his ravages far and wide, without pity. Yesterday, we were at peace; we asked nothing of anybody; we had done no harm; -and suddenly strange men came to strike, to ruin and destroy us. ...Fritz, remember this; war is all that is most abominable on earth. Men who do not know, who have never seen each other, rush suddenly together, to tear each other to pieces. This alone would make us believe in God, for there must be an avenger of such iniquity." (Chapter IV)

== See also ==
Digitized version of the full-text English translation published in 1903.
