= Denzil Batchelor =

British journalist, writer, and broadcaster

Denzil Batchelor

Denzil Stanley Batchelor (23 February 1906 – 6 September 1969) was a British journalist, writer, poet, playwright, wine expert and a radio and television broadcaster.

== Life and career ==
Denzil Batchelor was born in Bombay, India, the only son of Sir Stanley Lockhart Batchelor, a High Court judge in India. His grandfather was also a High Court judge in India. He was educated at Trent College and Worcester College, Oxford, where he obtained a BA in English literature and the English language. He boxed and played rugby at Oxford. His interest in sport continued after leaving university and saw him start his own cricket team, "The Batchelors." In London he became a journalist, writing for the Sketcher, Mercury and New Statesman. He was offered a job with a newspaper in Australia but on arrival found the firm closing down.

== In Australia ==
Batchelor was living in Sydney, Australia, by August 1931. There, he was employed as a journalist for The Daily Telegraph newspaper. Batchelor had started to engage in public speaking by 1933 when he gave a talk on the writings of George Bernard Shaw in October that year. He was giving talks on modern drama, women's writing and poetry by 1934 and was writing his own poetry by that date. He was early noted for his "sense of humor and amusing repartee". Soon after he began to speak on radio station 2FC. He wrote the screenplay for the 1935 Australian feature film The Burgomeister. He left Sydney by ship for London, via Singapore, on 24 May 1937.

== Back in Britain ==
On his return to London, Batchelor went to Spain as a war correspondent during the Spanish Civil War.

Batchelor married Eleanor Pack on 15 September 1939 in London. The couple had two sons, David and Christopher.

He served as a captain in the British Army during World War II, working in intelligence and propaganda. His play The Blue Giant was broadcast on the BBC Home Service in December 1945.

He was the secretary of the former cricketer C. B. Fry for several years, wrote a biography of him, helped Fry with his "autobiography" and was one of the few who could hold his own in conversation with him. He reported on cricket and rugby union for several newspapers, including The Times, and at one time was the sports editor of the magazine Picture Post. He wrote books on a wide range of subjects, both sporting and non-sporting, but is chiefly remembered for those on cricket and boxing. He was described as having "a more literary and imagistic approach than most sports writers". He is also remembered for his work as a broadcaster, wine connoisseur and novelist.

At one time he held the position of Registrar of the Authors' Association. He was described as "the wittiest man in London".

Batchelor died in London from a heart attack in the autumn of 1969 while the Great Cricketers anthology, which he edited, was still in the press. It was written of him in The Times shortly after his death,

... he was one of those men who did so many different things well ... He chose to diffuse his light rather than concentrate it. That gave him, maybe, more fun: it certainly gave more pleasure to others. Apart from his writing, he was an outstanding broadcaster. He could turn a fresh and vivid phrase as well as any man of his generation. He had, in abundance, the quality we call gusto – a joyful, adventurous spirit which carried him through many trials and made him, once met, never forgotten.

He is buried in Gunnersbury Cemetery, London.

== Bibliography ==
- Poems, E. Matthews & Marriott, 1927.
- The Test Match Murder, Angus & Robertson, Sydney, 1936.
- Gods with Gloves on, 1946.
- The Game Goes On, 1947.
- British Boxing (Britain In Pictures series), Collins, 1948.
- Days Without Sunset, 1949.
- The Match I Remember, Laurie, 1950.
- Turf of Old, HF & G Witherby, 1951 (1st edition), ISBN 978-0-85493-089-0.
- C.B. Fry (Cricketing Lives series), Phoenix House, 1951.
- They Laugh That Win, Hale, 1951.
- A Gallery of Great Players from W G Grace to the Present Day, Collins, 1952.
- The Book of Cricket, Collins, 1952.
- Game of a Lifetime, Laurie, 1953.
- Best Boxing Stories, Faber, 1953.
- The "Picture Post" Book of the Tests, 1953, Hulton Press, 1953.
- Soccer: A History of Association Football, Batsford, 1954.
- This My Son, Collins, 1954.
- Big Fight: The Story of World Championship Boxing, Phoenix House, 1954.
- The "Picture Post" Book of the Tests, 1954-5, Hulton Press, 1955.
- Jack Johnson and His Times, Phoenix House, 1956.
- The "Picture Post" Book of the Tests, 1956, Hulton Press, 1956.
- The Taste of Blood, Heinemann, 1956.
- Everything Happens to Hector, Heinemann, 1958.
- The Man Who Loved Chocolates, Heinemann, 1961.
- Babbled of Green Fields (autobiography), Hutchinson, 1961.
- The English Inn, Batsford, 1963.
- The Test Matches of 1964: England v. Australia, Epworth Press, 1964.
- The Boxing Companion, Eyre & Spottiswoode, 1964.
- For What We Are About To Receive, Jenkins, 1964.
- On the Brink, Macdonald & Co, 1964.
- London in Colour (British Heritage series), Batsford, 1964.
- The Sedulous Ape, Macdonald & Co, 1965.
- The Delicate Flower, Jenkins, 1965.
- Sportsman's London, London Transport Board, 1966.
- The Changing Face of Cricket (with Learie Constantine), Eyre & Spottiswoode, 1966.
- Best Cricket Stories (editor), Faber and Faber, 1967, ISBN 978-0-571-08006-9.
- Wines Great and Small, Cassell, 1969, ISBN 978-0-304-93449-2.
- Great Cricketers (editor), Eyre & Spottiswoode, 1970, ISBN 978-0-413-26510-4.
