= Avast (disambiguation) =

Avast is a Czech technology and internet security company.

Avast may refer to:

- Avast Antivirus, an antivirus software provided by Avast
- Avast, a nautical term meaning "stop" or "cease"
- Avast! Recording Company, a music recording studio in Seattle, Washington
- Avast!, a trademarked name for the herbicide fluridone
