= L'Aube rouge (opera) =

1911 French-language drame lyrique in four acts by Camille Erlanger

L'Aube rouge (the red dawn) is a French-language drame lyrique in four acts by Camille Erlanger to a libretto by Arthur Bernède and Paul de Choudens. It was premiered 29 December 1911, at Rouen. The opera was revived at the Wexford Opera Festival in October 2023.
