= Le Juif polonais =

1900 opera in three acts by Camille Erlanger

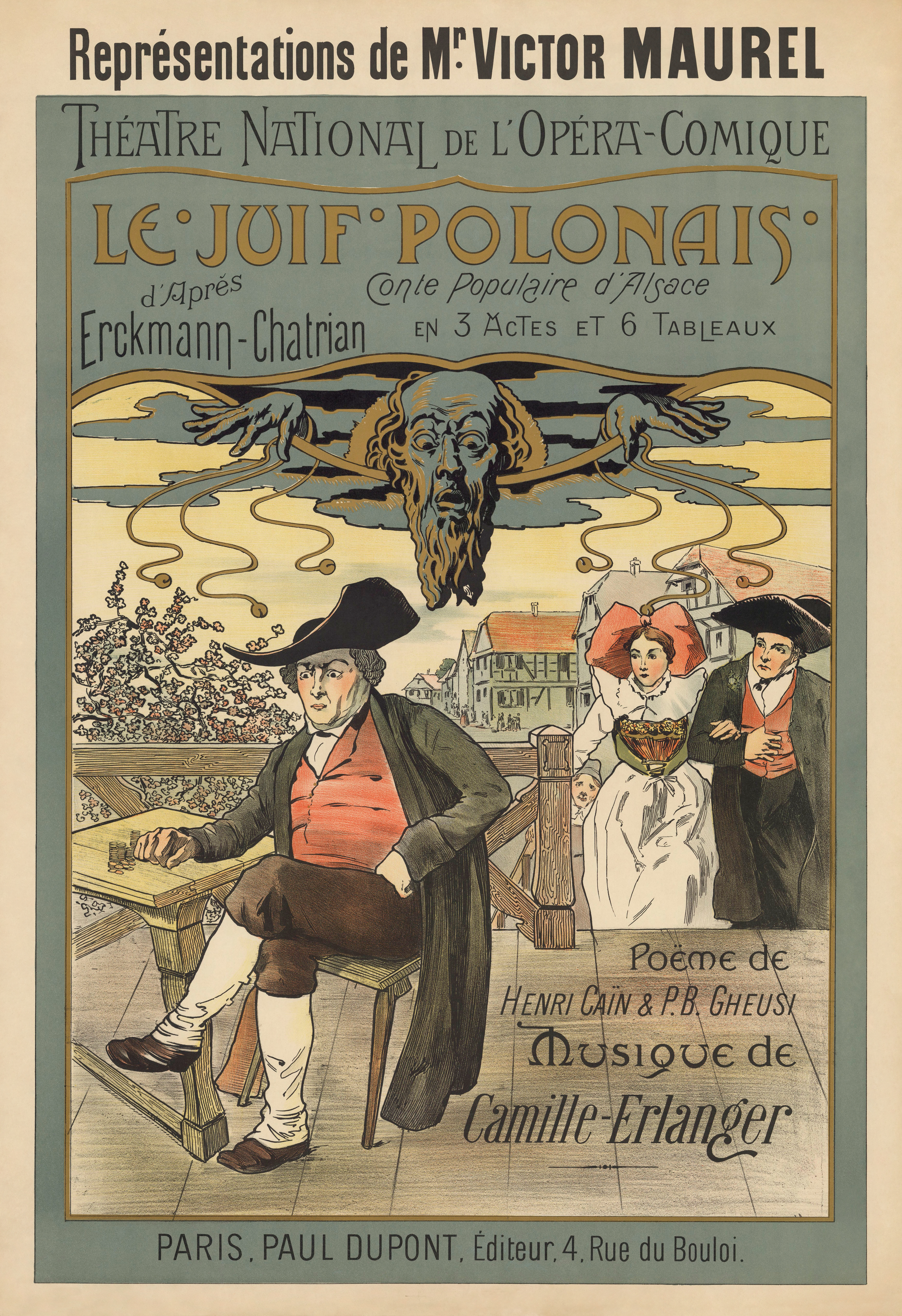
Poster from the première

Le Juif polonais (The Polish Jew) is a 1900 opera in three acts by Camille Erlanger composed to a libretto by Henri Caïn.

It was adapted from the 1867 stage play Le Juif polonais by Erckmann-Chatrian. The play was translated into English in 1871 as The Bells by Leopold Lewis. The same material was used by Karel Weis for his 1901 opera, Der polnische Jude.

== Plot ==
A melodramatic climax occurs in act 2 when the sound of sleigh bells at his daughter's wedding reminds the innkeeper Mathias of the Jew he had murdered 15 years previously. Dreaming, in act 3, that he is being tried for the murder, he confesses the details of the attack and his disposal of the body, and dies of a heart attack.

== Performances ==
The opera was first performed in Paris at the Opéra-Comique on 11 April 1900, when the cast included Gustave Huberdeau, the contralto Jeanne Gerville-Réache as Catherine, the bass André Gresse as the President, the tenor Edmond Clément as Christian and Victor Maurel as Mathias. The role of Mathias's daughter Suzelle was created by Julia Guiraudon. Unlike Erlanger's first opera, Karmaria, it was a great success and was performed in France until the 1930s.

Gustav Mahler presented the work in Vienna in 1906, where it proved a dismal failure. The plot was found to be thin, and the music insufficient to support interest. According to Alma Mahler, her husband had been reminded, when he heard the work in Paris, of his own Fourth Symphony by the sleighbells. Viennese critics rated the work as inferior to another on the same theme by Karel Weis, produced in Vienna in 1902. Nevertheless the opera remained in the repertory in France until the 1930s.
