= La Sorcière (opera) =

La Sorcière is a 1912 opera by Camille Erlanger on a libretto by André Sardou after the play of the same name by Victorien Sardou.

== Recording ==
La Sorciere Andreea Soare, Jean-Francois Borras, Lionel Lhote, Alexandre Duhamel, Marie-Eve Munger, Sofie Garcia, Servane Brochard, Choeur de la Haute école de musique de Genève, Orchestre de la Haute Ecole de Musique de Geneve, cond. Guillaume Tourniaire 3CDs B-Records, DDD, 2023
