= Leopold David Lewis =

English dramatist (1828–1890)

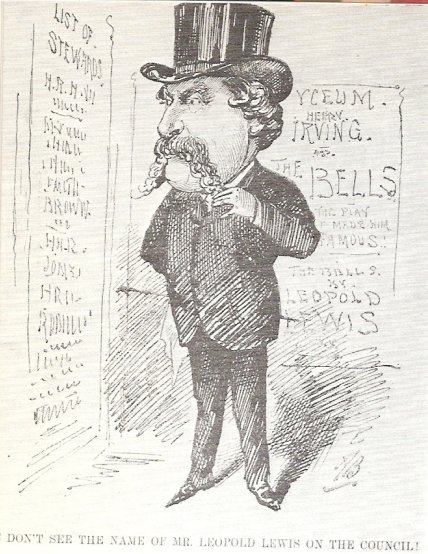
Leopold David Lewis by Alfred Bryan in 1883

Leopold David Lewis (19 November 1828 – 23 February 1890), was an English dramatist.

Lewis was born in London in 1828, the son of Elizabeth and David Leopold Lewis, a surgeon, and was educated at the King's College School, and upon graduation became a solicitor, practising as such from 1850 to 1875. In 1868 he married Jane Williams in London, and with her had a son, Thomas E. Lewis. In 1871, he translated Erckmann-Chatrian's Le Juif Polonais, giving it the name The Bells, under which name it was produced by Henry Irving at the Lyceum Theatre, London, 25 November 1871 and repeatedly thereafter.

The Bells was Lewis' first play, and his only success. Original plays from the pen of Lewis are: The Wandering Jew (Adelphi Theatre, 14 April 1873); Give a Dog a Bad Name (ib. 18 November 1873); and The Foundlings (Sadler's Wells Theatre, 8 October 1881). From February to December 1868 he and Alfred Thompson conducted a monthly review, The Mask, which failed. In addition to the plays mentioned Lewis wrote a number of tales under the title A Peal of Merry Bells (1880).

Lewis never got used to the success of The Bells, and although Irving did everything he could for him, Lewis became a man with a grievance, totally convinced that the success of The Bells was due to his adaptation rather than Irving's performance.

Lewis was found late one night seriously ill in Gray's Inn Road and was taken to the Royal Free Hospital where he died on 23 February 1890. He was buried at Kensal Green Cemetery. In his will he left just £20 10s to his widow, Jane.
