= Camille Erlanger =

French composer (1863–1919)

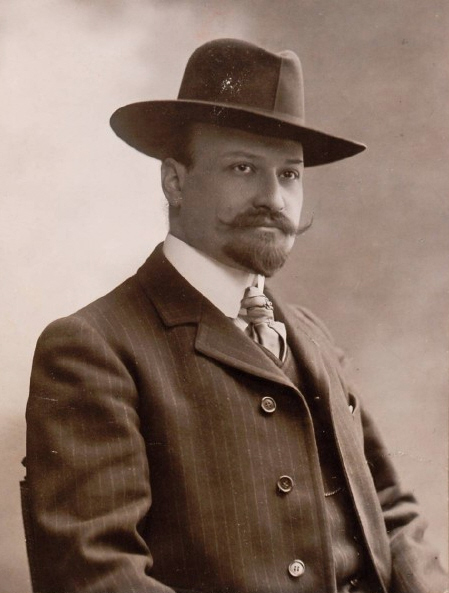
Camille Erlanger

Camille Erlanger (25 May 1863 – 24 April 1919) was a French opera composer. He studied at the Paris Conservatory under Léo Delibes (composition), Georges Mathias (piano), as well as Émile Durand and Antoine Taubon (harmony). In 1888 he won the Prix de Rome for his cantata Velléda. His most famous opera, Le Juif polonais, was produced at the Opéra-Comique in 1900.

Erlanger died in Paris and was buried in the Père Lachaise Cemetery.

A street in Quebec City, Avenue Erlanger, is named after Erlanger.

The opera L'Aube rouge was revived at the Wexford Festival (2023) directed by Guillaume Tourniaire and Christophe Manien. Broadcast in November on Raidió Teilifís Éireann and BBC Radio 3.

A concert version of La Sorcière was given on 12 December 2023 in Geneva's Victoria Hall, again conducted by Guillaume Tourniaire, and was recorded for a CD on the B.records label, released on 4 October 2024.

== Works ==
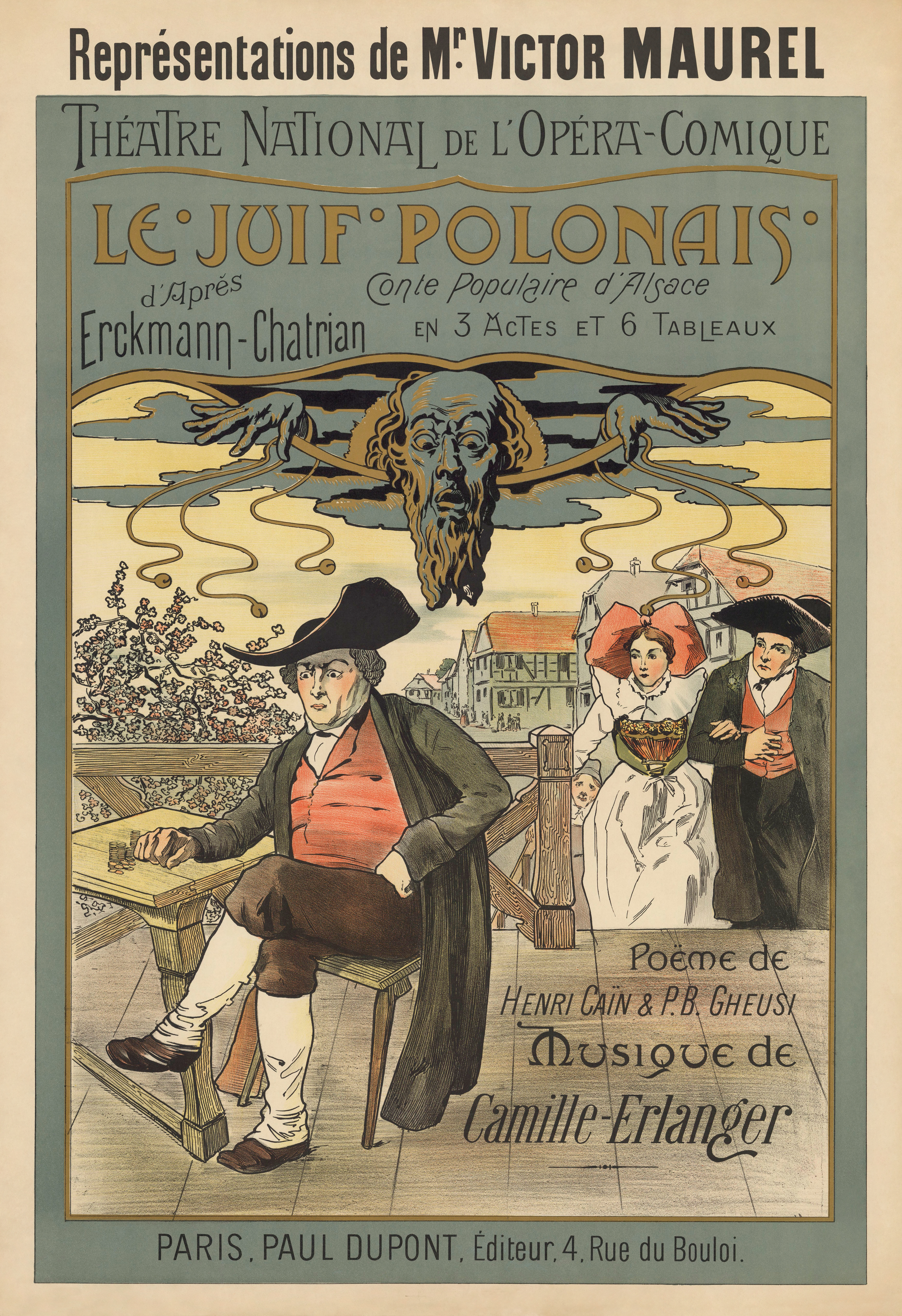
Poster from the première of Le juif polonais

- Velléda, scène lyrique (1888), given at the Concerts Colonne in 1889
- La Légende de Saint-Julien l'Hospitalier, légende dramatique in three acts and seven tableaux, after the story by Gustave Flaubert, (1888)
- Kermaria, drame lyrique in three acts, libretto by Pierre-Barthélemy Gheusi, Opéra-Comique 8 February 1897
- Faublas, libretto by Pierre-Barthélemy Gheusi, 1897
- Le Juif polonais, after a novel by Erckmann-Chatrian, Opéra-Comique, 11 April 1900
- Le Fils de l'étoile, drame musical in five acts, libretto by Catulle Mendès, 20 April 1904, Palais Garnier
- La Glu, drame lyrique after the novel by Jean Richepin
- Aphrodite, drame musical in five acts and seven tableaux after the novel by Pierre Louÿs, adaptation by Louis de Gramont, 23 (or 27 ?) March 1906, Opéra-Comique
- Bacchus triomphant, 11 September 1909, Bordeaux
- L'aube rouge, 29 December 1911, Rouen
- Hannele Mattern, rêve lyrique in five acts (1911), libretto by Jean Thorel and Louis-Ferdinand de Gramont (1854–1912) after the drama Hanneles Himmelfahrt by Gerhart Hauptmann, 28 January 1950, Strasbourg (Opéra du Rhin)
- La Sorcière, 18 December 1912, Paris
- Le Barbier de Deauville, 1917
- La Forfaiture, 1921, Paris

La Forfaiture, based on the 1915 film The Cheat, is the first opera to be based on a film scenario.
