= Émile Erckmann =

French writer

Émile Erckmann (20 May 1822 – 14 March 1899) was a French writer, strongly associated with the region of Alsace-Lorraine. Almost all of his works were written jointly with Alexandre Chatrian under the name Erckmann-Chatrian.

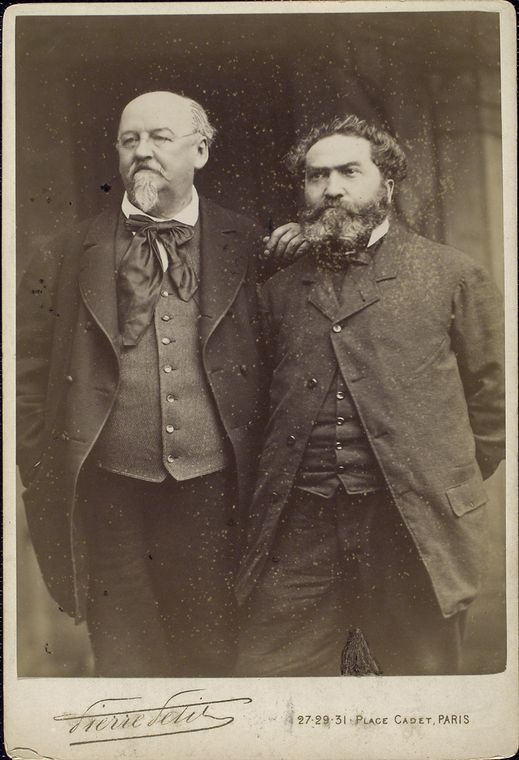
Ėmile Erckmann (left) with Alexandre Chatrian

== Life ==
=== Youth ===
He was born in Phalsbourg (Moselle), in Lorraine, and matured there. His mother died in 1832 and he was sent to boarding school.

He obtained his baccalaureat at Nancy before studying law at Paris from 1842. His first published work was Du recrutement militaire ("On military recruitment", 1843). Two years later he failed his third year of law and returned to Phalsbourg, ill with typhoid, where in the spring of 1847 he made the acquaintance of Alexandre Chatrian, a teacher. They became friends and spent their summer holidays together.

While staying at Paris, Erckmann witnessed the Revolution of 1848: inspired, they founded a political society in Phalsbourg and a short-lived newsletter at Strasbourg. Their politics were republican and nationalistic. At the beginning of the 1850s they began publishing in Le Démocrate du Rhin, expecting quick success, but after several years they became disillusioned. A play performed at Strasbourg in 1850, L'Alsace en 1814, was banned after just two performances. Erckmann moved to Rosny-sous-Bois and resumed his study of law in 1854. His father, Jean-Philippe, died in February 1858.

=== Success ===
Recognition came in 1859 and they became well known as fantasy writers under the joint pseudonym of Émile Erckmann-Chatrian. (Tales of supernatural horror by the duo that are famous in English include "The Wild Huntsman" (tr. 1871), "The Man-Wolf" (tr. 1876) and "The Crab Spider"). They moved together to Paris, where they lived close to the east railway station and returned frequently to Lorraine. By 1868, Erckmann was wealthy enough to buy back the sawmill at Grosshammerweyer. In the same year the publisher Hetzel bought exclusive rights to their work.

In August 1870, Erckmann was at Phalsbourg at the time of Mac-Mahon's defeat. With the Franco-Prussian War, the works of the two lorrains gained a popularity which was closely related to nationalistic desires for revenge and nostalgia for the "blue line of the Vosges" (i.e. the return of Alsace-Lorraine from Germany to France).

From 1872, Erckmann spent most of his time on the novels while Chatrian busied himself with their plays: it is likely that the joint pseudonym was now appearing on works that were no longer composed jointly. In September, Erckmann moved into a house at Saint-Dié, owned by the Goguel family, and the following year he went on a tour of the eastern Mediterranean: Egypt, Libya, Syria and Greece. Political entanglements started to make life difficult: he met Victor Hugo in 1874 as a result of his republican enthusiasms. He was forced to sell the sawmill in 1877.

=== Later years ===
In 1881 the Goguels complained about his relationship with their stewardess, Emma Flotat, and the couple moved out temporarily to Toul, where Erckmann became very ill with jaundice. The next year, German authorities gave Erckmann permission to travel to Phalsbourg.

The last work signed Erckmann-Chatrian was L’Art et les grands idéalistes (1885).

In 1886 Erckmann refused to sign a new contract that had been negotiated by Chatrian with their publisher, Hetzel. On 13 March 1887, Chatrian, at this time battling mental illness, wrote to Erckmann that he was paying ghost-writers out of their common royalties. This was the end of their association and their friendship. In 1888 Erckmann was diagnosed with diabetes, and the year after, his visa expired. No longer allowed to reside in his home town, he moved to Lunéville where he stayed until his death in 1899. Chatrian predeceased him in 1890.

== Works by Erckmann alone ==
- Essai sur le remplacement militaire (1844)

After the death of Chatrian, Erckmann published:

- Kaleb et Khora (1891)
- La Campagne du Grand-père Jacques (1892)
- Alsaciens et Vosgiens d'autrefois (1895)
- Fables alsaciennes et vosgiennes (1895)
