= Alexandre Chatrian =

French writer (1826–1890)

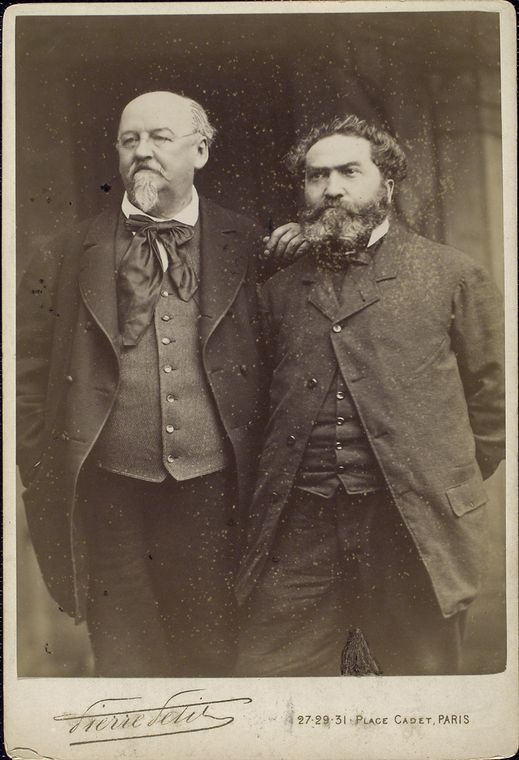
Alexandre Chartrian (right) with Ėmile Erckmann.

Alexandre Chatrian (18 December 1826 – 3 September 1890) was a French writer, associated with the region of Alsace-Lorraine. Almost all of his works were written jointly with Émile Erckmann under the name Erckmann-Chatrian.

== Life ==
=== Youth ===
He was born at Abreschviller (Moselle), in the locality known as le Grand Soldat (or Soldatenthal in German). From 1842 he studied in Phalsbourg (German Pfalzburg). During 1843 his father's glassworks went bankrupt, and the next year he went to Belgium for two years to earn a living as an accountant, after which he returned to Phalsbourg as a teacher.

He met Erckmann in 1847, and they became friends, spending the summer in the Vosges. While staying at Paris, Erckmann witnessed the Revolution of 1848: inspired, they founded a political club at Phalsbourg and a short-lived newsletter at Strasbourg. Their politics were republican and nationalist. At the start of the 1850s they began publishing in Le Démocrate du Rhin, expecting quick success, but after several years they became disillusioned. A play performed at Strasbourg in 1850, L'Alsace en 1814, was banned after just two performances. When he lost his teaching post, Erckmann persuaded him to move to Paris, where in 1852 he took a job as rail administrator the Compagnie des chemins de fer de l'Est.

=== Success ===
Recognition came in 1859 and they became well known as fantasy writers under the pseudonym of Erckmann-Chatrian. They moved together to Paris, where they lived close to the east railway station and returned frequently to Lorraine. In 1868 the publisher Hetzel bought exclusive rights to their work, and in May 1869 Chatrian purchased a property at Raincy. He began a relationship with Adélaïde Riberon, by whom he had two sons. His father, Jean-Baptiste, died on 13 July 1870. He married Riberon in February 1871.

During August 1870, Erckmann was at Phalsbourg at the time of Mac-Mahon's defeat. With the Franco-Prussian War, the works of the two lorrains gained a popularity which was closely related to nationalistic desires for revenge and nostalgia for the "blue line of the Vosges."

From 1872, Erckmann spent most of his time on the novels while Chatrian busied himself with their plays: it is likely that the joint pseudonym was now appearing on works that were no longer jointly written. In September, Erckmann moved into a house at Saint-Dié, and the following year he went on a tour of the eastern Mediterranean. Political entanglements started to make life difficult for the two ardent republicans. In 1880 a play by Chatrian, Alsace ou les fiancés d’Alsace, was banned by a republican minister.

=== Later years ===
In 1884 Chatrian retired from his position at the railway company and moved to Villemomble; the next year, his play Myrtille failed and he moved again to Saint-Dié. From this point on, his mental health began to deteriorate.

The last work signed Erckmann-Chatrian was L’Art et les grands idéalistes (1885).

In 1886 Erckmann refused to sign a new contract that had been negotiated by Chatrian with their publisher, Hetzel. On 13 March 1887, Chatrian, who was battling mental illness, wrote to Erckmann that he was paying ghost-writers out of their common royalties. This was the end of their association and their friendship.

On 19 August 1889, Chatrian's former secretary published an article in Le Figaro attacking Erckmann, who responded with a lawsuit. About this time, the desperately ill Chatrian lost his reason entirely. Erckmann's visa expired; no longer allowed to reside in his home town, he moved to Lunéville.

Chatrian died on 3 September 1890 in Villemomble.
