= Erckmann-Chatrian =

French authors

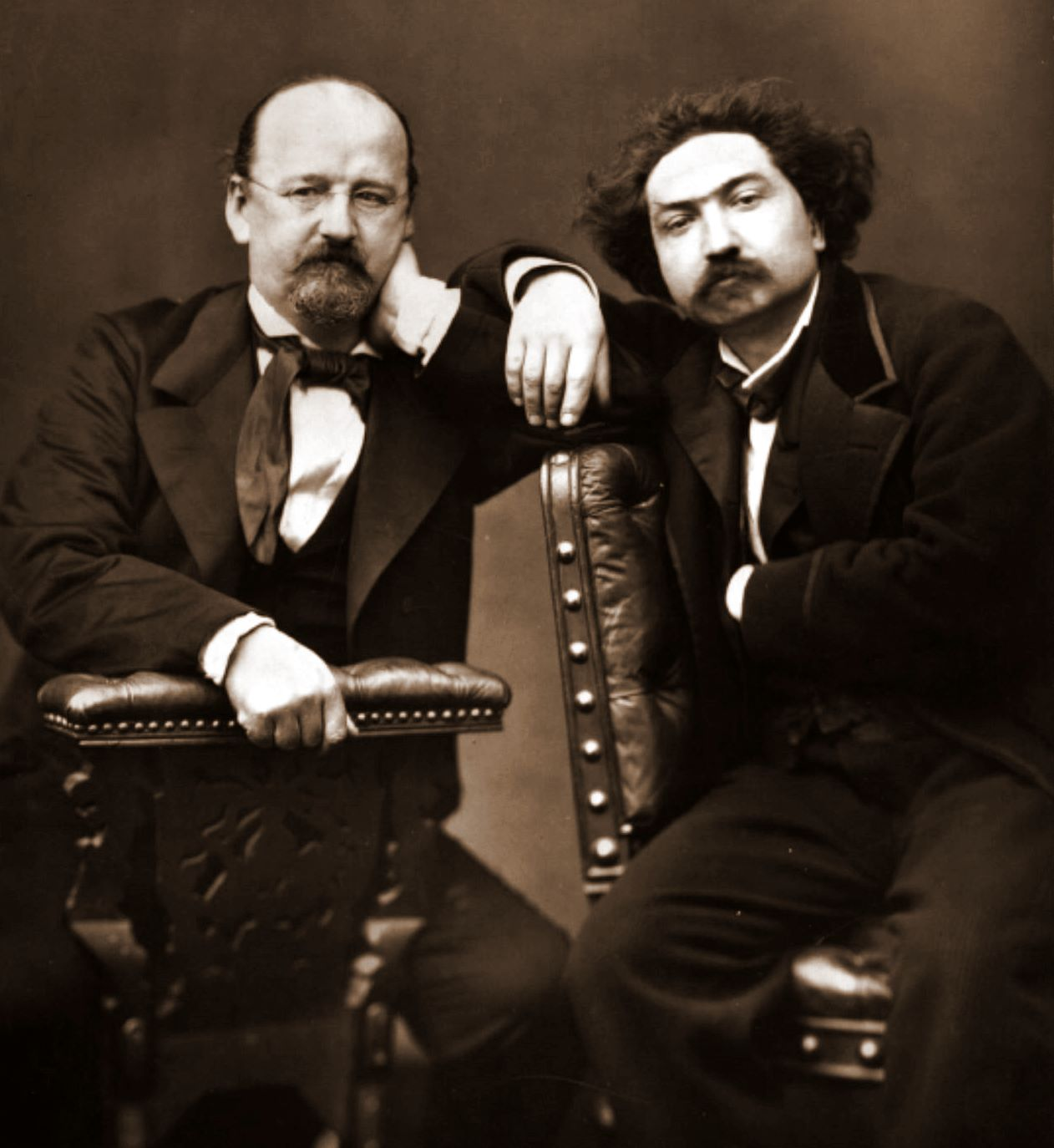
Woodburytype of Émile Erckmann and Alexandre Chatrian circa 1875

Erckmann-Chatrian was the name used by French authors Émile Erckmann (1822–1899) and Alexandre Chatrian (1826–1890), nearly all of whose works were jointly written.

== History ==
Both Erckmann and Chatrian were born in the département of Meurthe (now Moselle), in the Lorraine region in the extreme north-east of France. They specialised in military fiction and ghost stories in a rustic mode Lifelong friends who first met in the spring of 1847, they finally quarreled during the mid-1880s, after which they did not produce any more stories jointly. During 1890 Chatrian died, and Erckmann wrote a few pieces under his own name.

Many of Erckmann-Chatrian's works were translated into English by Adrian Ross.

Tales of supernatural horror by the duo that are well known in English include "The Wild Huntsman" (tr. 1871), "The Man-Wolf" (tr. 1876) and "The Crab Spider." These stories received praise from the renowned English ghost story writer, M. R. James, as well as H. P. Lovecraft.

Erckmann-Chatrian wrote numerous historical novels, some of which attacked the Second Empire in anti-monarchist terms. Partly as a result of their republicanism, they were praised by Victor Hugo and Émile Zola, and fiercely attacked in the pages of Le Figaro. Gaining popularity from 1859 for their nationalistic, anti-militaristic and anti-German sentiments, they were well-selling authors but had trouble with political censorship throughout their careers. Generally the novels were written by Erckmann, and the plays mostly by Chatrian.

A festival in their honour is held every summer in the town of Erckmann's birth, Phalsbourg (German Pfalzburg), which also contains a military museum exhibiting editions of their works.

== Works ==
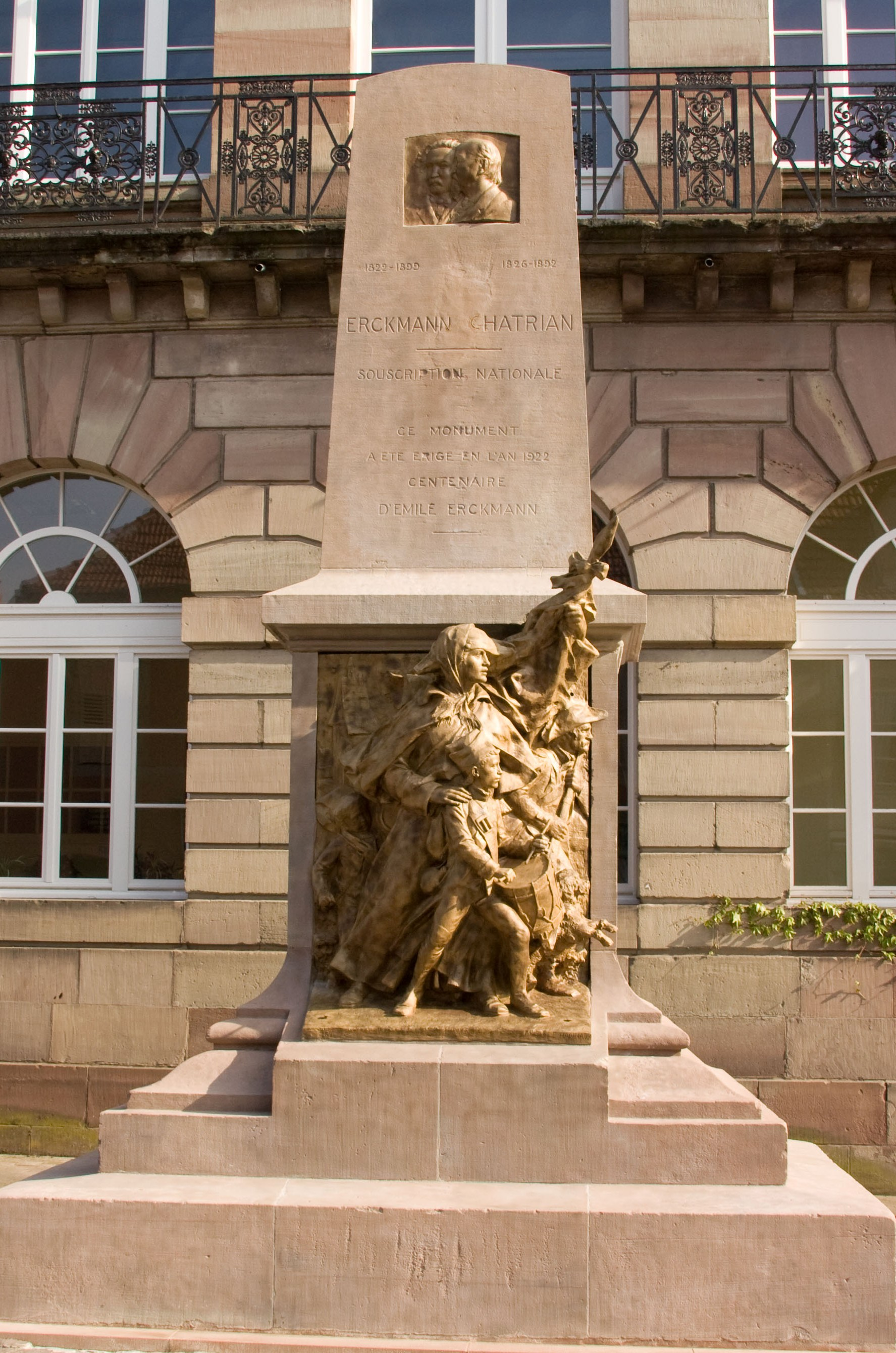
Erckmann-Chatrian Monument in Phalsbourg, Moselle

=== First works ===
Many of these were not published until the 1860s.

- Malédiction; Vin rouge et vin blanc (1849)
- L’Alsace en 1814, play (1850)
- Science et génie, fantasy story (1850)
- Schinderhannes ou les Brigands des Vosges (1852)
- Le Bourgmestre en bouteille (by Erckmann, 1856)
- L’Illustre Docteur Mathéus (1856)
- Contes fantastiques: Le Requiem du corbeau, Rembrandt et L’Œil invisible (1857)
- Gretchen et La Pie (1858)

=== From 1859 ===
- Les Lunettes de Hans Schnaps (1859)
- Le Rêve du cousin Elof (1859)
- La Montre du doyen (1859)
- Hans Storkus (1859)
- Les Trois âmes (1859)
- Hugues-le-loup (1859) – this notable tale of a werewolf has been translated into English as "The Man-Wolf" (1876)
- La Tresse Noire (1859)
- Contes de la montagne; Contes fantastiques (1860)
- Maître Daniel Rock (1861)
- Le Fou Yégof (1861)
- L’Invasion ou le Fou Yégof (1862)
- Les Contes du bord du Rhin (1862)
- Confidences d’un joueur de clarinette (1862)
- Madame Thérèse (1863)
- La Taverne du jambon de Mayence (1863)
- Confidences d’un joueur de clarinette (1863)
- Les Amoureux de Catherine (1863)
- Histoire d’un conscrit de 1813 (1864)
- L’Ami Fritz (1864)
- Waterloo (sequel to Conscrit de 1813, 1865)
- Histoire d’un homme du peuple (1865)
- La Maison forestière (1866)
- La Guerre (1866)
- Le Blocus (1866)
- Contes et romans populaires (1867)
- Le Juif polonais, play (1867)
- Histoire d’un paysan (1867)

=== After the Franco-Prussian War ===
- Histoire du plébiscite racontée par un des 7 500 000 oui, essay (1871)
- Lettre d’un électeur à son député, pamphlet against reactionaries (1871)
- Les Deux Frères (1871)
- Histoire d’un sous-maître (1871)
- Une campagne en Kabylie (1873)
- Les Années de collège de Maître Nablot (1874)
- Le Brigadier Frédéric, histoire d’un Français chassé par les Allemands (1874)
- Maître Gaspard Fix, histoire d’un conservateur (1875)
- L’Education d’un féodal (1875)
- L’Intérêt des paysans, lettre d’un cultivateur aux paysans de France, essay (1876)
- Contes et romans alsaciens (1876)
- Souvenirs d’un ancien chef de chantier à l’isthme de Suez (1876)
- Les Amoureux de Catherine and L’Ami Fritz, plays (adapted by Chatrian, 1877)
- Contes vosgiens (1877)
- Alsace ou les fiancés d’Alsace, play (adapted by Chatrian from Histoire du plébiscite, 1880)
- Le Grand-père Lebigre (1880)
- Les Vieux de la vieille (1880)
- Quelques mots sur l’esprit humain, résumé de la philosophie d’Erckmann, essay (1880)
- Le Banni (sequel to Le Brigadier Frédéric, 1881)
- La Taverne des Trabans, play (adapted from La Taverne du jambon de Mayence, 1881)
- Les Rantzau, play (adapted from Deux Frères, 1882)
- Madame Thérèse, play (adapted by Chatrian, 1882)
- Le Banni (1882)
- Le Fou Chopine, play (adapted from Gretchen, 1883)
- Époques mémorables de l’Histoire de France: avant ’89 (1884)
- Myrtille, play (1885)
- L’Art et les grands idéalistes, essay (1885)
- Pour les enfants, essay (published 1888)

=== English translations ===
- The Man-Wolf and Other Tales (1876, rpt 1976)
- Strange Stories (1880)
- The Count of Nideck (1897), translated by Ralph Browning Fiske
- The Conscript: A Story of the French War of 1813 (1900)
- Best Tales of Terror (1980) edited by Hugh Lamb

== Bibliography ==
- Benoît-Guyod, G. La Vie et l'Œuvre d'Erckmann-Chatrian. Témoignages et documents. Tome 14, Jean-Jacques Pauvert, Paris, 1963.
- Hinzelin, Émile. Erckmann-Chatrian. Étude biographique et littéraire. J. Ferenczi et fils, Paris, 1922.
- Schoumacker, L. Erckmann-Chatrian. Étude biographique et critique d'après des documents inédits. Les Belles-Lettres, Paris, 1933.
