= Ellert =

Ellert is a given name and surname of Germanic origin. Like the related Eilers, Ehlers and Eilert it has emerged from the medieval Germanic first name Eilhart/Eilhard (agi(l) = "awe", "terror" + hart = "hard", "strong").

Notable people with the surname include:

== Given name ==
- Ellert Schram (1939–2025), Icelandic footballer and politician
- Ellert Sölvason (1917–2002), Icelandic footballer

== Surname ==
- Gundi Ellert (born 1951), German television actress
- Levi Richard Ellert (1857–1901), 23rd mayor of San Francisco
