= Cinema of Australia =

- No. of screens: 2,238 (2025)
  - Per capita: 8.18 per 100,000 (2024)
- Main distributors: Disney (24%); Universal (20%); Warner Bros. (19%); Paramount (8%); Sony (6%); Roadshow (4%)

Produced feature films (2024)
- Total: 84

Number of admissions (2025)
- Total: 54,200,000

Gross box office (2025)
- Total: A$970 million
- National films: A$25.1 million (2.6%)

The cinema of Australia began with the 1906 production of The Story of the Kelly Gang, arguably the world's first feature film. Since then, Australian crews have produced many films, a number of which have received international recognition. Many actors and filmmakers with international reputations started their careers in Australian films, and many of these have established lucrative careers in larger film-producing centres such as the US and the UK.

Commercially successful Australian films include George Miller's five Mad Max installments (1979-2024), Peter Faiman's Crocodile Dundee (1986), Chris Noonan's Babe (1995), Rob Sitch's The Castle (1997), and Baz Luhrmann's Moulin Rouge! (2001). Award-winning productions include Picnic at Hanging Rock (1975), Gallipoli (1981), Shine (1996), The Tracker (2002), and Ten Canoes (2006).

== History ==
The Australian film critic David Stratton characterized the history of the country's film as one of "boom and bust": there have been deep troughs, during which few films were made for decades, and high peaks, during which a glut of films reached the market.

=== Pioneer days – 1890s to 1910 ===
The first public screenings of films in Australia took place in October 1896, within a year of the world's first screening in Paris by Lumière brothers. On 22 August 1896, the first films projected to a paying audience in Australia were at Harry Rickards' Melbourne Opera House (later known as the Tivoli Theatre). The film by magician Carl Hertz was screened as part of a variety show act. Australian tours with similar projection machines followed. Australia's first cinema, the Salon Lumière at 237 Pitt Street, Sydney, was operating in October 1896, and showed the first Australian-produced short film titled Passengers Alighting from Ferry Brighton at Manly on 27 October 1896.

The first locally produced and successfully screened cinema program was a series of eleven one-minute film reels taken from the Victoria Derby on 31 October 1896 and the Melbourne Cup on 3 November 1896, both of which races were won by the same horse, Newhaven. Directed by Henry Walter Barnett, the Lumiere Brothers film was photographed by celebrated cinematographer Marius Sestier. They were first shown at the Princess Theatre, Melbourne, on 19 November 1896, then taken to Sydney where they were shown at the Criterion Theatre on 24 November 1896. Three of the reels are still in existence.

The Athenaeum Hall in Collins Street, Melbourne, operated as a dance hall from the 1880s, and from time to time would provide alternative entertainment to patrons. In October 1896 it exhibited the first movie film shown in Australia, within a year of the first public screening of a film in Paris on 28 December 1895 by the French Lumière brothers. The Athenaeum would continue screenings, such as Life in Our Navy, a 60,000 foot film of life on HMS Jupiter, shown on 26 January 1901 by G. H. Snazelle, who provided additional entertainment.

A landmark of newsreel photography was in 1897, when films of both the Caulfield Cup and Melbourne Cup were screened at the Melbourne Opera House on the evenings of the race. The events had been captured on film for W. C. Baxter and developed the same day by photographer Robert William Harvie (died 5 October 1922) and inventor Ernest J. Thwaites (c. 1873 – 12 July 1933).

Some of the earliest movie film shot in Australia consisted of films of Aboriginal dancers in Central Australia, shot by anthropologists Baldwin Spencer and F. J. Gillen between 1900 and 1903. They pioneered sound recording on wax cylinders and shot their films under very difficult conditions.

The earliest feature-length narrative film in the world was the Australian-produced The Story of the Kelly Gang (1906), shown at the Athenaeum. The film, written and directed by Charles Tait, included several of his family members. The film was also exhibited in the United Kingdom in January 1908.

Melbourne also hosted one of the world's first film studios, the Limelight Department, operated by the Salvation Army in Australia between 1897 and 1910. The Limelight Department produced evangelical material for use by the Salvation Army, as well as carrying out private and government contracts. In its 19 years of operation the Limelight Department produced about 300 films of various lengths, making it the largest film-producer of its time. The major innovation of the Limelight Department came in 1899 when Herbert Booth and Joseph Perry began work on Soldiers of the Cross (1900), described by some as the first feature-length film ever produced. Soldiers of the Cross fortified the Limelight Department as a major player in the early film-industry. The Limelight Department also produced a film recording of the Federation of Australia.

=== Boom and bust – 1910s to 1920s ===
The 1910s were a "boom" period in Australian cinema. Activity had begun slowly in the 1900s, and 1910 saw four narrative films released, then 51 in 1911, 30 in 1912, and 17 in 1913, and back to four in 1914, when the beginning of World War I brought a temporary pause in film-making. While these numbers may seem small in the 21st century, Australia was one of the most prolific film-producing countries at the time. In all, between 1906 and 1928 Australia made 150 narrative feature films, almost 90 of them between 1910 and 1912.

A general consolidation took place in the early 1910s in the production, distribution and exhibition of films in Australia. By 1912 numerous independent producers had merged into Australasian Films and Union Theatres, later Greater Union (now known as Event Cinemas), which established control over film distributors and cinemas and required smaller producers to deal with the cartel. Some view the arrangement as opening the way for American distributors in the 1920s to sign exclusive deals with Australian cinemas to exhibit only their own products, thereby shutting out the local product and crippling the local film-industry.

Various other explanations attempt to account for the decline of the industry in the 1920s. Some historians point to falling audience numbers, a lack of interest in Australian product and narratives, and Australia's participation in the war. Also, an official ban on bushranger films occurred in 1912. With the suspension of local film-production, Australian cinema-chains sought alternative products in the United States and realised that Australian-produced films were much more expensive than the imported product, which were priced cheaply as production expenses had already been recouped in the home market. To redress this imbalance, the federal government of Australia imposed a tax on imported film in 1914, but this was removed by 1918.

Whatever the explanation, by 1923 American films dominated the Australian market, with 94% of all exhibited films coming from the United States.

=== 1930s–1960s ===
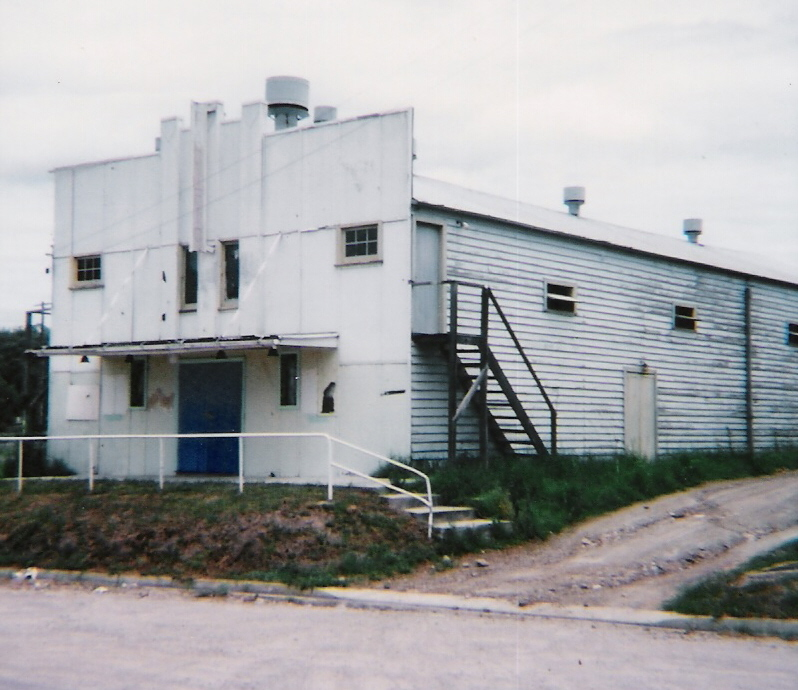
The old Pacific Cinema at Bulahdelah, New South Wales - a classic example of an early, small, country-town cinema

In 1930, F. W. Thring (1883–1936) established the Efftee Studios based in Melbourne to make talking films using optical sound equipment imported from the United States. The first Australian sound films appeared in 1931: the company produced Diggers (1931), A Co-respondent's Course (1931), The Haunted Barn (1931) and The Sentimental Bloke (1932). During the five years of its existence, Efftee produced nine features, over 80 shorts and several stage-productions. Notable collaborators included C. J. Dennis, George Wallace and Frank Harvey. Film production continued only until 1934, when it ceased as a protest over the refusal of the Australian government to set Australian film-quotas, followed soon by Thring's death in 1936. It was estimated that Thring lost over £75,000 of his own money on his filmmaking and theatrical ventures.

Ken G. Hall became a driving force in establishing Cinesound Productions in 1931. The company became one of Australia's first feature-film production companies and operated into the early 1940s, becoming Australia's leading domestic studio based on the Hollywood model. The company also used the Hollywood model for the promotion of its films and attempted to promote a star system. It was particularly successful with the On Our Selection (1932) series of comedies, based on the popular writings of author Steele Rudd, which featured the adventures of a fictional Australian farming family, the Rudds, and the perennial father-and-son duo, "Dad and Dave". Despite its ambitions, Cinesound produced only 17 feature-films, all but one of them directed by Ken Hall. Though financially successful, the company ceased making feature films following the 1939 outbreak of World War II.

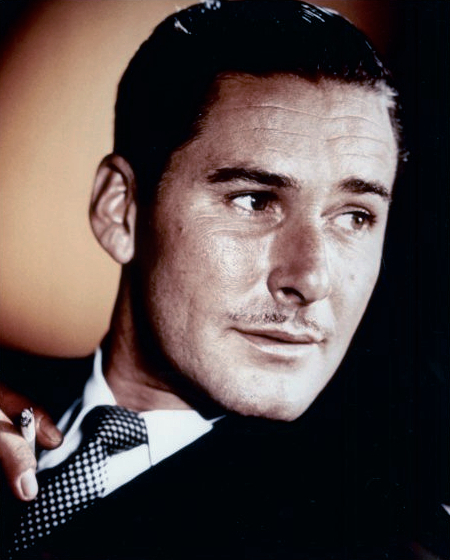
Errol Flynn had his debut in In the Wake of the Bounty (1933)

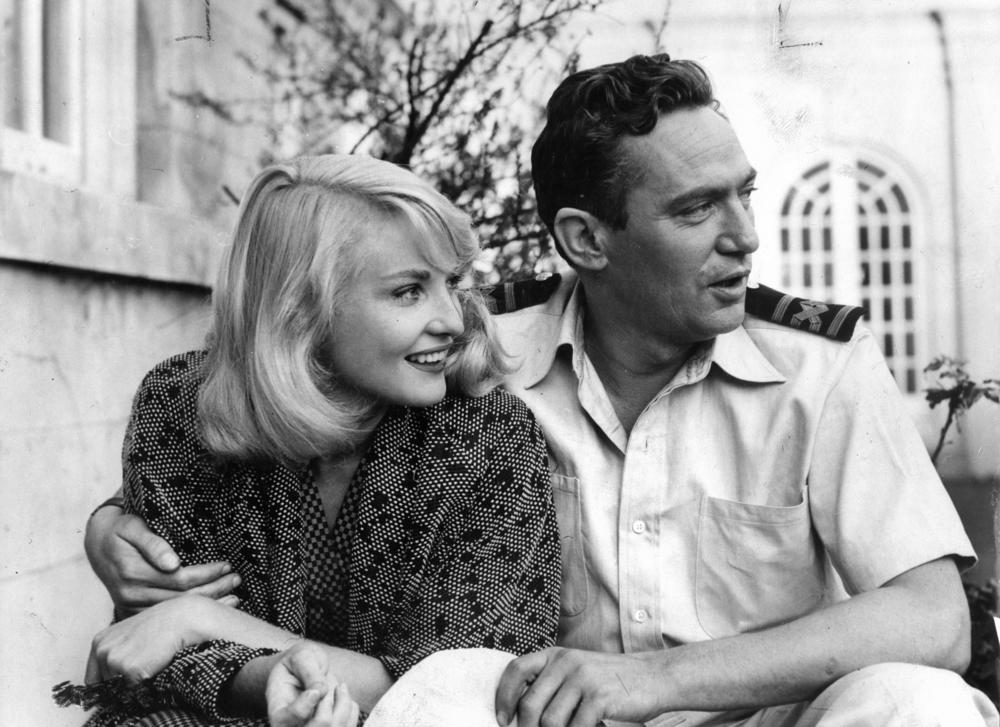
Peter Finch with fellow Australian Diane Cilento during the making of British film Passage Home (1955)

In the Wake of the Bounty (1933), directed by Charles Chauvel, starred Tasmanian-born Errol Flynn. The film was not a success. Flynn then travelled to Britain to pursue a career in acting and later went to America and became a celebrated Hollywood star. Chauvel directed a number of successful Australian films, including 1944's World War II classic The Rats of Tobruk (which starred Peter Finch and Chips Rafferty) and 1955's Jedda, which was notable as the first Australian film shot in colour, and as the first to feature Aboriginal actors in lead roles and to enter the Cannes Film Festival.

In Britain, the Cinematograph Films Act 1927 established a quota of films that had to be shown in British cinemas. One could shoot compliant films in the British Empire as well as in Great Britain; this stimulated Australian film-production. However the Cinematograph Films Act 1938 mollified the British film industry by including only films made by and shot in Great Britain in the quota - this removed Australian films from the film quota in the UK, and saw the loss of a guaranteed market for Australian films.

Kokoda Front Line! (1942), directed by Ken G. Hall, won Australia's first Oscar. Chips Rafferty and Peter Finch became prominent international stars of the period. Rafferty's onscreen image as a lanky, laconic bushman struck a chord with Australian filmgoers, and he appeared in iconic early Australian films such as Forty Thousand Horsemen (1940), The Rats of Tobruk (1944), The Overlanders (1946) and Eureka Stockade (1949) (Overlanders and Eureka were part of a series of Australian-themed films produced by Britain's iconic Ealing Studios). In Hollywood, Rafferty also appeared in Australian-themed films, including The Desert Rats (1953), The Sundowners (1960) and Mutiny on the Bounty (1962). Similarly, Peter Finch starred in quintessentially Australian roles (such as "digger" and stockman) through a series of popular films and had a successful and diverse screen career in Britain and the United States.

Both Ron Randell and Rod Taylor began their acting careers in Australia - initially in radio and on stage before appearing in such Australian films as Smithy (1946) for the former and Long John Silver (1954) for the latter. They each transferred to the United States to become Hollywood leading men in a number of films of the late 1940s (Randell) and both from the 1950s onwards. Taylor had starring roles in The Time Machine (1960) and The Birds (1963) as well as in several American television-series such as Hong Kong (1960–1961).

In the 1950s British and American production-companies made several notable films in Australia based on stories from Australian literature (generally with strong rural themes). These included A Town Like Alice (1956, which starred Virginia McKenna and Peter Finch); The Shiralee (1957, also starring Peter Finch with Australian actors Charles Tingwell, Bill Kerr and Ed Devereaux in supporting roles); Robbery Under Arms (1957, again starring Finch); and Summer of the Seventeenth Doll (1959, starring Ernest Borgnine, John Mills and Angela Lansbury). In 1960, The Sundowners was shot partly in the Snowy Mountains of New South Wales with foreign leads Deborah Kerr, Robert Mitchum, and Peter Ustinov but a supporting cast including Australians - Chips Rafferty, John Meillon and Leonard Teale.

In 1958, Australian Film Institute was formed and in the same year began awarding the Australian Film Institute Awards.

After filming Whiplash in the country in 1960, Peter Graves said that the biggest problem was the shortage of Australian actors. Australian film-production reached a low ebb with few notable productions during the 1960s. The 1966 comedy They're a Weird Mob, starring Walter Chiari, Chips Rafferty and Claire Dunne, was a rare hit of the period which also documented something of the changing face of Australian society: telling the story of a newly-arrived Italian immigrant who, working as a labourer in Sydney, becomes mates with his co-workers, despite some difficulties with Australian slang and culture. The film foreshadowed the successful approaching "New Wave" of Australian cinema of the 1970s that would often showcase colloquial Australian culture.

Overseas cinema continued to attract Australian actors as "action-men" with the casting of Australian George Lazenby to replace Sean Connery in portraying the superspy James Bond in the 1969 U.K. film On Her Majesty's Secret Service.

=== Renaissance – 1970s and 1980s ===
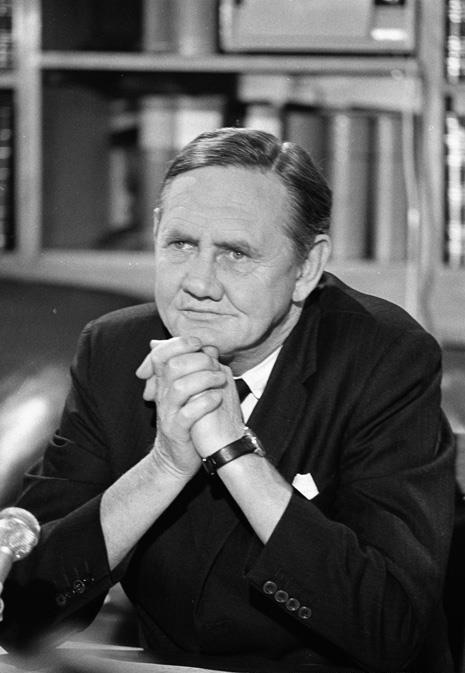
Prime Minister John Gorton initiated several avenues of government support for Australian cinema

John Gorton, Prime Minister of Australia from 1968 to 1971, initiated several forms of government support for film and the arts, including the Australian Film Development Corporation. The Gough Whitlam government (1972–75) continued the support via its successor the Australian Film Commission, and state governments also established assistance programs. These measures led to a resurgence of Australian film-making in both the low budget 16mm format and 35mm cinema – the Australian New Wave – which lasted until the mid-to-late 1980s. The era also marked the emergence of the "Ozploitation" style – characterised by the exploitation of colloquial Australian culture.

Also notable during this era was the effect of the growing feminist movement. The role of women's films was discussed at the Women's Liberation Conference in Melbourne in 1970, and groups such as the Feminist Film Workers collective (1970s and 1980s), Sydney Women's Film Group (SWFG, 1972–), Melbourne Women's Film Group (1973–), Reel Women (1979 to 1983 in Melbourne), and Women's Film Unit (Sydney and Melbourne, 1984/85) were established. A number of filmmakers, including Jeni Thornley, Sarah Gibson, Susan Lambert, Martha Ansara, Margot Nash and Megan McMurchy, were involved in these groups. The 1975 International Women's Film Festival, the first of its kind, was initiated by the SWFG, but groups around the country organised screening events in other state capitals. In Melbourne and Sydney the festivals ran for nine days (with an audience of around 56,000), and in the other states they spanned two to three days.

Films such as Picnic at Hanging Rock (directed by Peter Weir, 1975) and Sunday Too Far Away (Ken Hannam, 1975) made an impact on the international scene. The 1970s and 1980s are regarded by many as a "golden age" of Australian cinema, with many successful films, from the dark dystopian fiction of Mad Max (George Miller, 1979) to the romantic comedy of Crocodile Dundee (Peter Faiman, 1986) and the emergence of such film-directing auteurs as Gillian Armstrong, Phillip Noyce and Bruce Beresford.

A major theme of Australian cinema which matured in the 1970s was one of survival in the harsh Australian landscape. A number of thrillers and horror-films - dubbed "outback gothic" – have appeared, including Wake in Fright, Walkabout, The Cars That Ate Paris and Picnic at Hanging Rock in the 1970s, Razorback, Long Weekend and Shame in the 1980s and Japanese Story, The Proposition and Wolf Creek in the 2000s. These films depict the Australian bush and its creatures as deadly, and its people as outcasts and psychopaths. These elements combine with futuristic post-apocalyptic themes in the Mad Max series. 1971's Walkabout was a British film, set in Australia, which became a forerunner to many Australian films related to indigenous themes; it introduced David Gulpilil to cinematic audiences. 1976's The Chant of Jimmie Blacksmith directed by Fred Schepisi re-told an award-winning historical drama from the book by Thomas Keneally about the tragic story of an Aboriginal bushranger.

Classic stories from Australian literature and Australian history continued to provide popular cinematic adaptations during the 1970s and 1980s. Gillian Armstrong's My Brilliant Career (1979) featured Judy Davis and Sam Neill in early lead-roles. 1982's We of the Never Never followed up on the theme of the female experience of life in the Australian bush. 1982's The Man from Snowy River, starring Tom Burlinson and Sigrid Thornton, dramatised the classic Banjo Paterson poem of that name and became one of the all-time box-office successes of Australian cinema. In addition to the serious historical dramas popular in the 1970s, a number of films celebrating and satirizing Australian colloquial culture appeared over the decade, including: The Adventures of Barry McKenzie (1972), Alvin Purple (1973), and Barry McKenzie Holds His Own (1974). The Barry McKenzie films saw performing-artist and writer Barry Humphries collaborating with director Bruce Beresford. In 1976, Peter Finch won a posthumous Academy Award for Best Actor for his role in the American satire Network, thus becoming the first Australian to win an Oscar for best actor.

1980's Breaker Morant (starring Jack Thompson and Edward Woodward) dramatised the controversial trial of an Australian soldier during the Boer War of 1899–1902; there followed 1981's World War I drama Gallipoli (directed by Peter Weir and starring Mel Gibson). These films, now considered classics of Australian cinema, explored contemporary Australian identity through dramatic episodes in Australian history. Gibson went on to further success in 1982's The Year of Living Dangerously before transferring to pursue his Hollywood career as an actor and director. Many other Australian stars would follow his path to international stardom in the coming decades. The director of The Year of Living Dangerously, Peter Weir, also made a successful transition to Hollywood. Weir contributed to the screenplay along with its original author, Christopher Koch, and playwright David Williamson. Williamson rose to prominence in the early 1970s, and has gone on to write several other original scripts and screenplays made into successful Australian films, including: Don's Party (1976); Gallipoli (1981), Emerald City (1988), and Balibo (2009).

Actor/comedian Paul Hogan wrote the screenplay and starred in the title role in his first film, Crocodile Dundee (1986), about a down-to-earth hunter who travels from the Australian outback to New York City. The movie became the most successful Australian film ever, and launched Hogan's international film career. Following the success of Crocodile Dundee, Hogan starred in the sequel, Crocodile Dundee II in 1988. 1988 also saw the release of the drama Evil Angels (released outside of Australia and New Zealand as A Cry in the Dark) about the Lindy Chamberlain saga, in which a dingo took a baby at Ayers Rock and her mother was accused of having murdered the child.

Nicole Kidman began appearing in Australian children's TV and film in the early 1980s – including starring roles in BMX Bandits and Bush Christmas. During the 1980s she appeared in several Australian productions, including Emerald City (1988), and Bangkok Hilton (1989). In 1989 Kidman starred in Dead Calm alongside Sam Neill and Billy Zane. The thriller garnered strong reviews, and Hollywood roles followed.

=== 1990–2000 ===
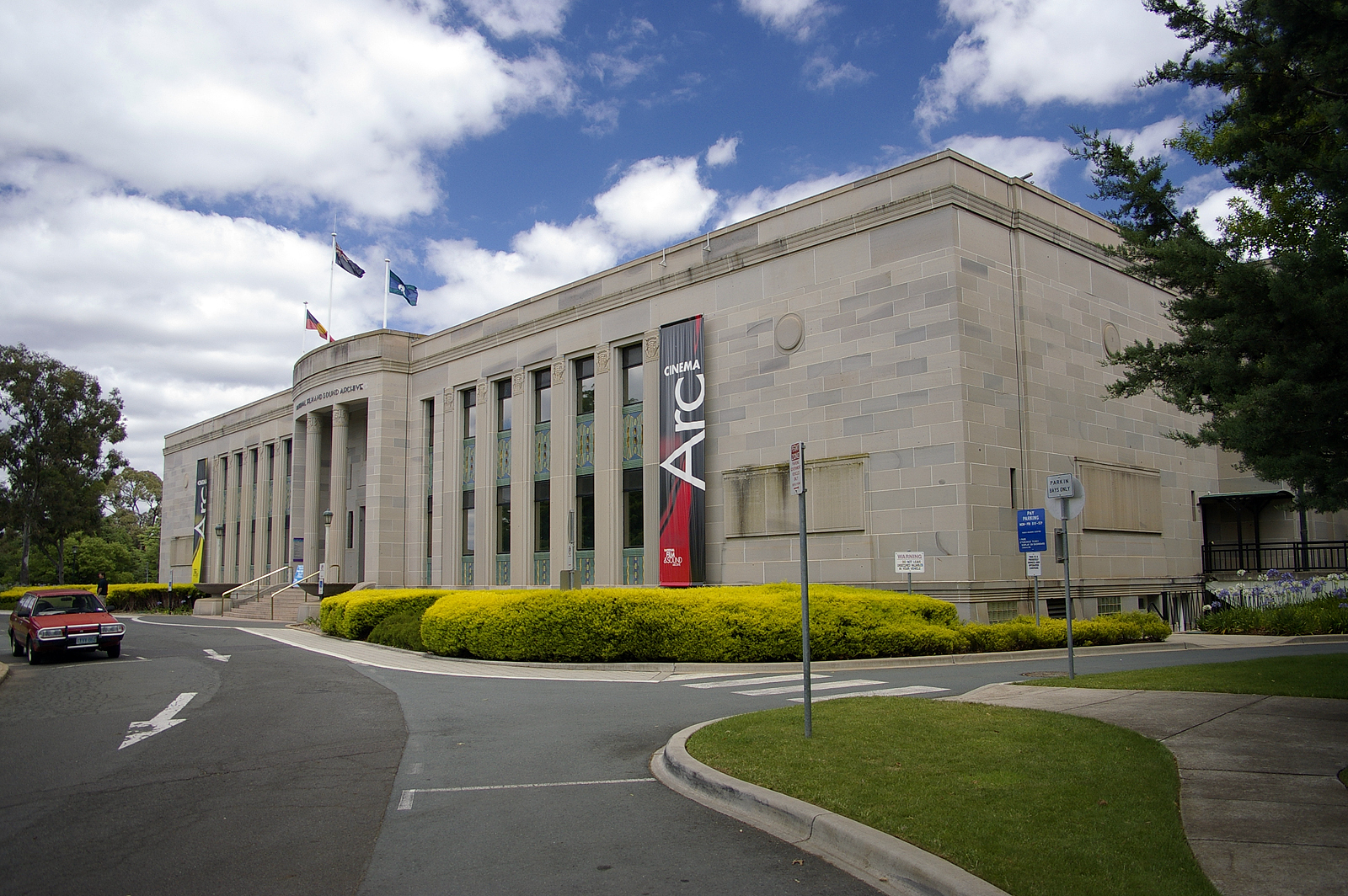
The National Film and Sound Archive in Canberra

"Is everyone in Australia a few degrees off from true north? You can search in vain through the national cinema for characters who are ordinary or even boring; everyone is more colorful than life. If England is a nation of eccentrics, Australia leaves it at the starting line."

— Roger Ebert describing the eccentric national character in his review for the film Chopper (2000).

The 1990s proved a successful decade for Australian film and introduced several new stars to a global audience. Low budget films such as the comedy/drama Muriel's Wedding, starring Toni Collette, the gently satirical suburban comedy The Castle directed by Rob Sitch (which cast Eric Bana in his first prominent film role), and Baz Luhrmann's flamboyant Strictly Ballroom each attained commercial and critical success, and explored quirky characters inhabiting contemporary Australian suburbia – marking something of a departure from the Outback and historical sagas which obtained success in the 1970s and 1980s. Stephan Elliott's 1994 film The Adventures of Priscilla, Queen of the Desert mixed traditional outback cinematography and landscape with contemporary urban sub-culture: following three drag queens on a road trip to Central Australia.

While a number of major international stars gained early prominence in Australia over the period, an important stable of established and emerging local stars with prodigious film credits remained prominent, including screen veterans Charles Tingwell, Bill Hunter, Jack Thompson, Bryan Brown and Chris Haywood.

The World War II drama Blood Oath (1990) debuted both Russell Crowe and Jason Donovan, in minor cinematic roles. Crowe demonstrated his versatility as an actor in this early period of his career by starring soon after as a street gang Melbourne skinhead in 1992's Romper Stomper and then as an inner-Sydney working-class gay man in 1994's The Sum of Us before transferring to the US to commence his Hollywood career.

George Miller's Babe (1995) employed new digital effects to make a barnyard come alive and went on to become one of Australia's highest-grossing films. The 1996 drama Shine achieved an Academy Award for Best Actor award for Geoffrey Rush and Gregor Jordan's 1999 film Two Hands gave Heath Ledger his first leading role.

Ausfilm was established in 1994 as the Export Film Services Association, after Austrade recognised potential opportunities for the country in the American market. It was converted to an incorporated association, Ausfilm International Inc., in 1998. It continues to promote the use of Australian filmmakers, and to get film production work done in Australia.

=== 2001–2019 ===
After Ledger's successful transition to Hollywood, Jordan and Ledger collaborated again in 2003, with Ledger playing the iconic bushranger title role in the film Ned Kelly, co-starring Australian actress Naomi Watts.

The canon of films related to Indigenous Australians also increased over the period of the 1990s and early 21st Century, with Nick Parsons' 1996 film Dead Heart featuring Ernie Dingo and Bryan Brown; Rolf de Heer's The Tracker, starring Gary Sweet and David Gulpilil; and Phillip Noyce's Rabbit-Proof Fence in 2002. In 2006, Rolf de Heer's Ten Canoes became the first major feature film to be shot in an Indigenous language and the film was recognised at Cannes and elsewhere.

The shifting demographics of Australia following post-war multicultural immigration was reflected in Australian cinema through the period and in successful films like 1993's The Heartbreak Kid; 1999's Looking for Alibrandi; 2003's Fat Pizza; the Wog Boy comedies and 2007's Romulus, My Father which all dealt with aspects of the migrant experience or Australian subcultures.

Fox Studios Australia and Village Roadshow Studios had hosted large international productions like George Lucas's Star Wars: Episode II – Attack of the Clones and Episode III – Revenge of the Sith, and the Wachowskis's The Matrix.

Rob Sitch and Working Dog Productions followed the success of The Castle with period comedy The Dish, which was the highest grossing Australian film of the Year 2000 and entered the top ten list of highest grossing Australian films. Big budget Australian-international co-productions Moulin Rouge! (Baz Luhrmann, 2001) and Happy Feet (which won the Academy Award for Best Animated Feature for filmmaker George Miller in 2006) also entered the top ten list during the first decade of the new century. Baz Luhrmann directed a series of international hits and returned to Australia for the production of 2008's Australia, which showcased a host of Australian stars including Nicole Kidman, Hugh Jackman and David Wenham and went on to become the second highest-grossing film in Australian cinematic history.

Lantana, directed by Ray Lawrence attained critical and commercial success in 2001 for its examination of a complex series of relationships in suburban Sydney, and events surrounding a mysterious crime. It won seven AFI Awards including Best Picture, Best Director, Best Actor for Anthony LaPaglia and Best Actress for Kerry Armstrong.

Emerging star Sam Worthington had early lead roles in the 2002 mobster black comedy Dirty Deeds and 2003's crime caper Gettin' Square. Gettin Square also featured rising star David Wenham who demonstrated versatility with a string of critically acclaimed roles including the title role in Paul Cox's 1999 biopic Molokai: The Story of Father Damien and the 2001 thriller The Bank, directed by the politically conscious film director Robert Connolly.

In 2005, Little Fish marked a return to Australian film for actress Cate Blanchett and won five Australian Film Institute Awards including Best Actor for Hugo Weaving, Best Actress for Blanchett and Best Supporting Actress for screen veteran Noni Hazlehurst.

In 2008 following Ledger's death, the documentary film celebrating the romps of the Australian New Wave of 1970s and 1980s low-budget cinema: Not Quite Hollywood: The Wild, Untold Story of Ozploitation! The film was directed by Mark Hartley and interviews filmmakers including Quentin Tarantino, Dennis Hopper, George Miller and Barry Humphries.

The early 2000s were generally not successful years for Australian cinema, with several confronting dramas proving unpopular at the box office. In 2008, no Australian movies made $3 million at the box office, but a conscious decision by filmmakers to broaden the types of films being made as well as the range of budgets produced a series of box-office hits at the close of the decade. Strong box office performances were recorded in 2009–10 by Bruce Beresford's Mao's Last Dancer; the Aboriginal musical Bran Nue Dae the dramatization of John Marsden's novel Tomorrow, When the War Began; and the crime drama Animal Kingdom which featured major Australian screen stars Ben Mendelsohn, Joel Edgerton, Guy Pearce and Jacki Weaver. Animal Kingdom achieved success at the 2010 Australian Film Institute Awards and was acclaimed at film festivals around the world. Tomorrow, When the War Began became the highest-grossing domestic film of 2010 and it was nominated for nine Australian Film Institute Awards.

Other award-winning films of the period included Balibo (2009) starring Anthony LaPaglia; Middle Eastern crime flick Cedar Boys (2009) directed by Serhat Caradee; and animated comedy drama Mary and Max.

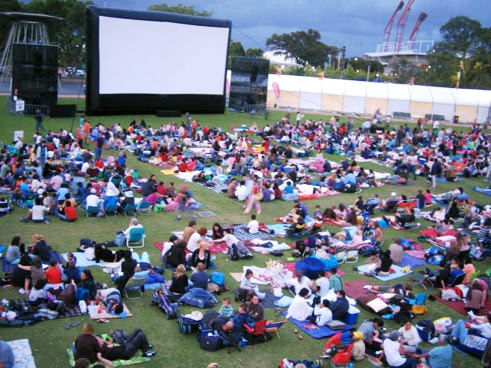
An open-air cinema in Sydney in 2010

World War I drama Beneath Hill 60 (2010), directed by Jeremy Sims and starring Brendan Cowell, was nominated for numerous awards and won three.

Sally Riley, as inaugural head of the Indigenous department at ABC Television, after her previous role at the Australian Film Commission (later Screen Australia), has done much to develop Indigenous talent in the film and television industry. Contemporary Indigenous film-makers include Warwick Thornton, Wayne Blair, Trisha Morton-Thomas and Rachel Perkins.

The Australian film industry continues to produce a reasonable number of films each year, but in common with other English-speaking countries, Australia has often found it difficult to compete with the American film industry, the latter helped by having a much larger home market. The most successful Australian actors and filmmakers are easily lured by Hollywood and rarely return to the domestic film industry. The South Australian Film Corporation continues to produce quality films, and Adelaide has been chosen as the location for films such as Hotel Mumbai (2019).

=== 2020–present ===
The Australian film and TV industry was greatly impacted by the COVID-19 pandemic, with at least 60 shoots being halted and around 20,000 people being put of work. On Monday 23 March, all productions funded by Screen Australia were postponed. As of 15 April 2020, after some improvement in COVID-19 statistics in Australia, Screen Australia continues to fund work and process applications, intending to use all of its 2019/20 budget.

Sometime after the movie and TV industries reopened, several films restarted production. Two such films were Escape from Pretoria (2020) and Mortal Kombat (2021).

== Genres ==
=== Australian Gothic films ===
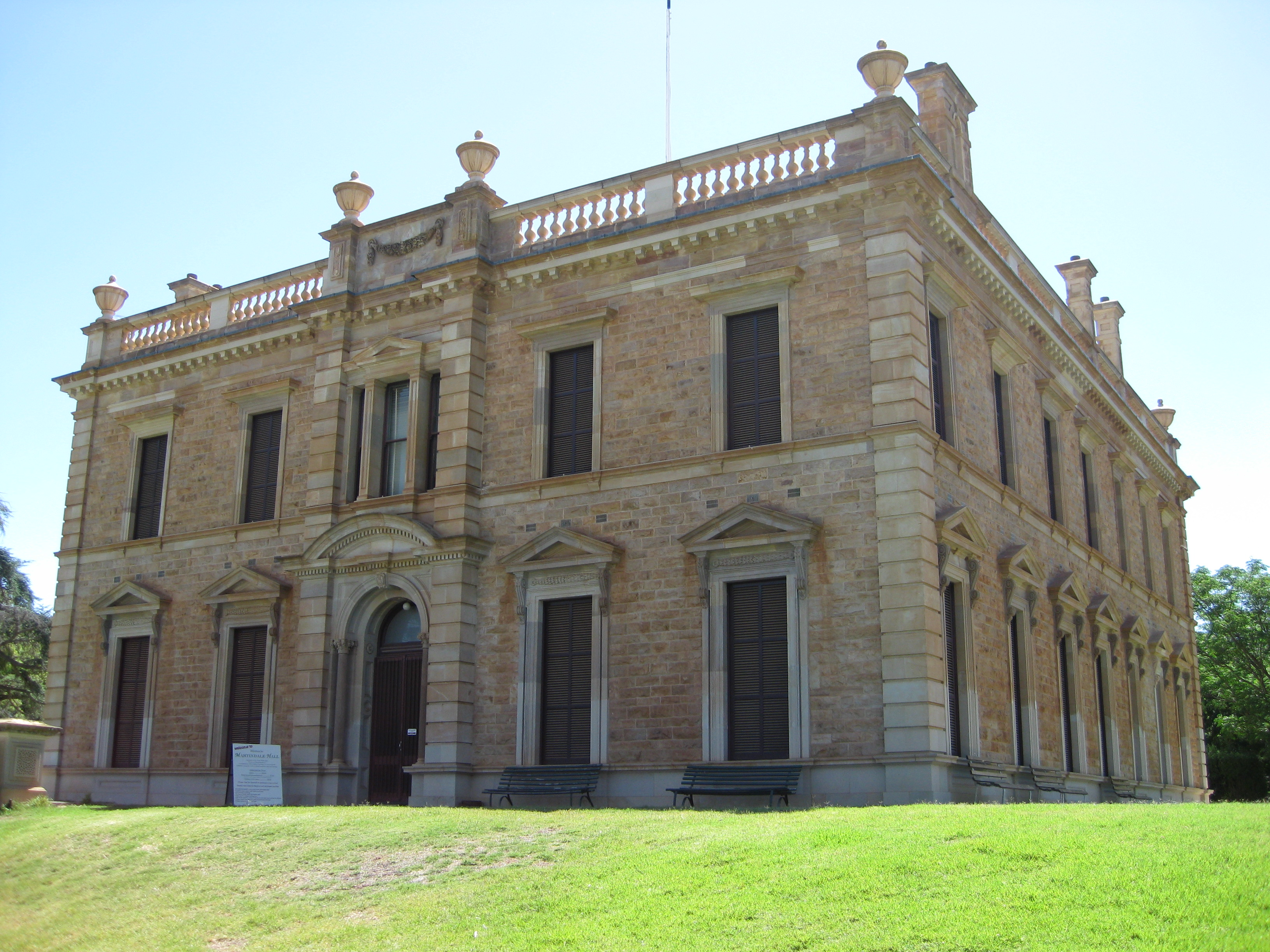
Martindale Hall (located near Mintaro in South Australia), was the location for Appleyard Hall, the school featured in Picnic at Hanging Rock (1975).

Gothic films incorporate Gothic elements and can be infused within different genres such as horror, romance, science fiction, and comedy. Australian Gothic films have been an accordant genera ever since the 1970s. Gothic Australian films means to make films that are diverse and use camera techniques in different ways to question what the audience may perceive. One of the Australian Gothic films created by female filmmakers Suzan Dermody and Elizabeth Jacka called The Screening of Australia (1987), shows different stylistic thematic terms and was the most successful at showing what is called the ocker, a term to describe a (white) Australian savage man. Other than this, there is a strong relationship between Australian Gothic films and Gothic literature. The characters and the actions that happen in a Gothic novel is created into a Gothic film. Most Gothic novels during the 1970s referred to female characters and their Australian cultural values.

Although the film Picnic at Hanging Rock (1975) was directed by a male filmmaker, it was written by storyteller Joan Lindsay. Lindsay decided to make this film culturally related to Australian societal issues of day-to-day lives. Her film included Gothic materials and gave a twist of horror that later the director will showcase through the mise-en-scene and cinematography. The use of Gothic materials were offered by the filmmakers Dermody and Jacka to other Australian Gothic films that have opened up to a more thematic analysis. Other Gothic films were made to broaden Australian characteristics and features. Smoke Em If You Got ‘Em (1988), produced by Jennifer Hooks, showcased the protagonist in a supernatural horrific way, but also added a comedic twist to not lose its characterization of film style.

== Film schools ==
There are several film schools in Australia, most notably the Australian Film, Television and Radio School, known as AFTRS in Sydney. Others include Griffith Film School, Australian Performing Arts Conservatory (APAC) in Brisbane; the WA Screen and Media Academy at Edith Cowan University in Perth; and Media Arts and Production, University of Technology Sydney (MAP UTS). All are full members of CILECT, the international association of film schools.

In Melbourne, Victoria, Swinburne Film and Television School (1966–1991) produced many notable filmmakers, before merging into Victorian College of the Arts, becoming VCA Film and Television School (later merged into the University of Melbourne). However Swinburne University's Swinburne School of Film and Television (SSFT) remains, and both the VCA and SSFT are full members of CILECT. RMIT University runs various degree and diploma courses relating to filmmaking. In addition, in collaboration with AFTRS, it started delivering four short intensive courses relating to filmmaking and the film industry from December 2024.

In South Australia, Flinders University introduced their Bachelor of Creative Arts Screen (BCA) in 2002, which proved both popular and successful.

== Government support ==
John Gorton, Prime Minister of Australia from 1968–1971, initiated several forms of Government support for Australian film and the arts, establishing the Australian Council for the Arts, the Australian Film Development Corporation and the Australian Film, Television and Radio School. Prime Minister Gough Whitlam continued to support Australian film. The South Australian Film Corporation was established in 1972 to promote and produce films, while the Australian Film Commission was created in 1975 to fund and produce internationally competitive films.

The federal Australian government had supported the Australian film industry through the funding and development agencies of Film Finance Corporation Australia, the Australian Film Commission and Film Australia. In 2008 the three agencies were consolidated into Screen Australia.

=== Government funding bodies ===
- Screen Australia (successor to Australian Film Commission, Film Australia, and Film Finance Corporation Australia)
- Screen Canberra
- Screen Queensland (successor to Queensland Film Corporation)
- Screen NSW
- Screen Tasmania (successor to Tasmanian Film Corporation)
- Screen Territory
- Screenwest
- South Australian Film Corporation
- VicScreen

== Highest-grossing Australian films ==
10 highest-grossing Australian films at the Australian box office as of 2023
Rank	Title	Year of release	Budget (A$)	Australian gross (A$)	Worldwide gross (US$)	Co-producing countries
1	Crocodile Dundee	1986	$11,500,000	$47,707,598	$328,203,506	United States
2	Australia	2008	$200,000,000 (US$130,000,000, US$78,000,000 after tax incentives)	$37,555,757	$211,342,221	United States, United Kingdom
3	Babe	1995	$30,000,000	$36,797,861	$254,134,910	United States
4	Elvis	2022	$120,000,000	$33,612,964	$193,701,000	United States
5	Happy Feet	2006	$132,740,000	$31,786,593	$384,335,608	United States
6	Lion	2016	$15,000,000	$29,567,752	$140,312,928	United States, United Kingdom
7	Moulin Rouge!	2001	$52,000,000	$27,765,415	$179,213,434	United States
8	The Great Gatsby	2013	$105,000,000	$27,392,375	$353,641,895	United States
9	Peter Rabbit	2018	$50,000,000	$26,794,641	$351,266,433	United States
10	Crocodile Dundee II	1988	$15,800,000	$24,916,805	$239,606,210	United States

=== Other financial hits ===
High-grossing Australian films from earlier decades include:

- 1900s – The Story of the Kelly Gang (1906) (gross £20,000)
- 1910s – The Fatal Wedding (1911) (£18,000), The Life Story of John Lee, or The Man They Could Not Hang (1912) (£20,000), The Martyrdom of Nurse Cavell (1915) (£25,000)
- 1920s – For the Term of His Natural Life (1927) (over £40,000)
- 1930s – On Our Selection (1932) (£60,000), The Silence of Dean Maitland (1934) (£50,000)
- 1940s – Forty Thousand Horsemen (1940) (£130,000), Smithy (1946) (over £50,000), The Overlanders (1946) (£250,000), Sons of Matthew (1949)
- 1950s – Walk Into Paradise (1956)
- 1960s – They're a Weird Mob (1966) (over $2 million)
- 1970s – Alvin Purple (1973) ($4.72 million), Picnic at Hanging Rock (1975) (over $5 million), Mad Max (1979) ($100 million)

== Directors ==
- Gillian Armstrong
- Tony Ayres
- Stuart Beattie
- Bruce Beresford
- David Caesar
- Charles Chauvel
- Paul Cox
- Kieran Darcy-Smith
- Andrew Dominik
- Kevin James Dobson
- Matt Drummond
- Peter Duncan
- Nash Edgerton
- Adam Elliot
- Stephan Elliott
- Richard Franklin
- Rolf de Heer
- Scott Hicks
- John Hillcoat
- P. J. Hogan
- Gregor Jordan
- Ana Kokkinos
- Ray Lawrence
- Raymond Longford
- Baz Luhrmann
- James McTeigue
- David Michôd
- George Miller
- George T. Miller
- Russell Mulcahy
- Chris Noonan
- Phillip Noyce
- Matthew Victor Pastor
- Alex Proyas
- Sally Riley
- Fred Schepisi
- Anupam Sharma
- Rob Sitch
- The Spierig Brothers
- Kriv Stenders
- Warwick Thornton
- Brian Trenchard-Smith
- James Wan
- Rachel Ward
- Peter Weir
- Simon Wincer
- Leigh Whannell

== Actors ==
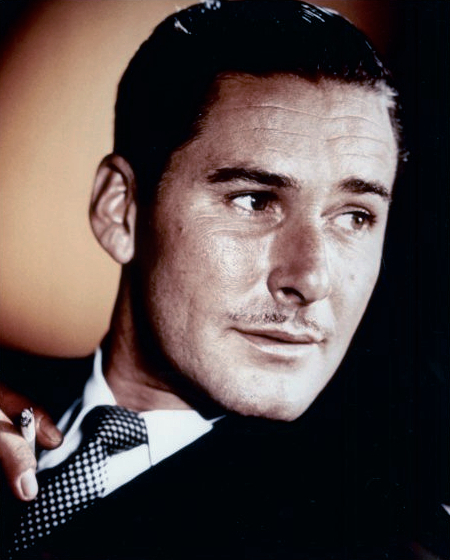
Errol Flynn, star of The Adventures of Robin Hood and Captain Blood

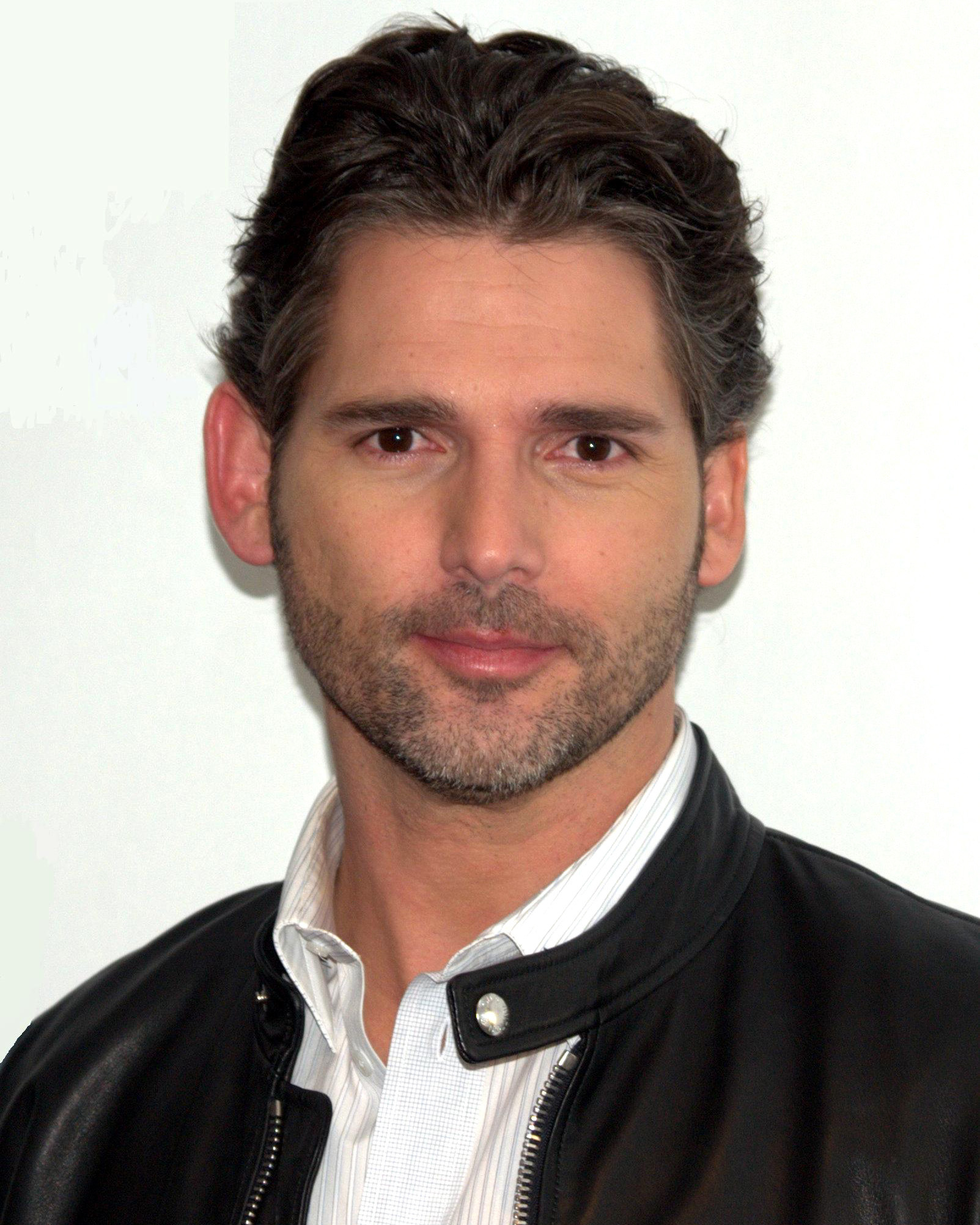
Eric Bana, star of Chopper and Munich

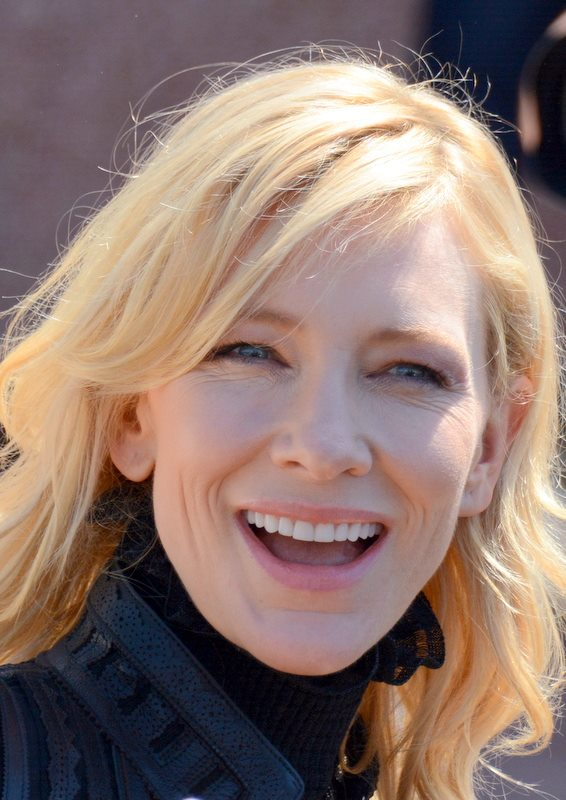
Cate Blanchett, the first Australian to win two Academy Awards and the most nominated Australian in the acting categories overall with 7 nominations.

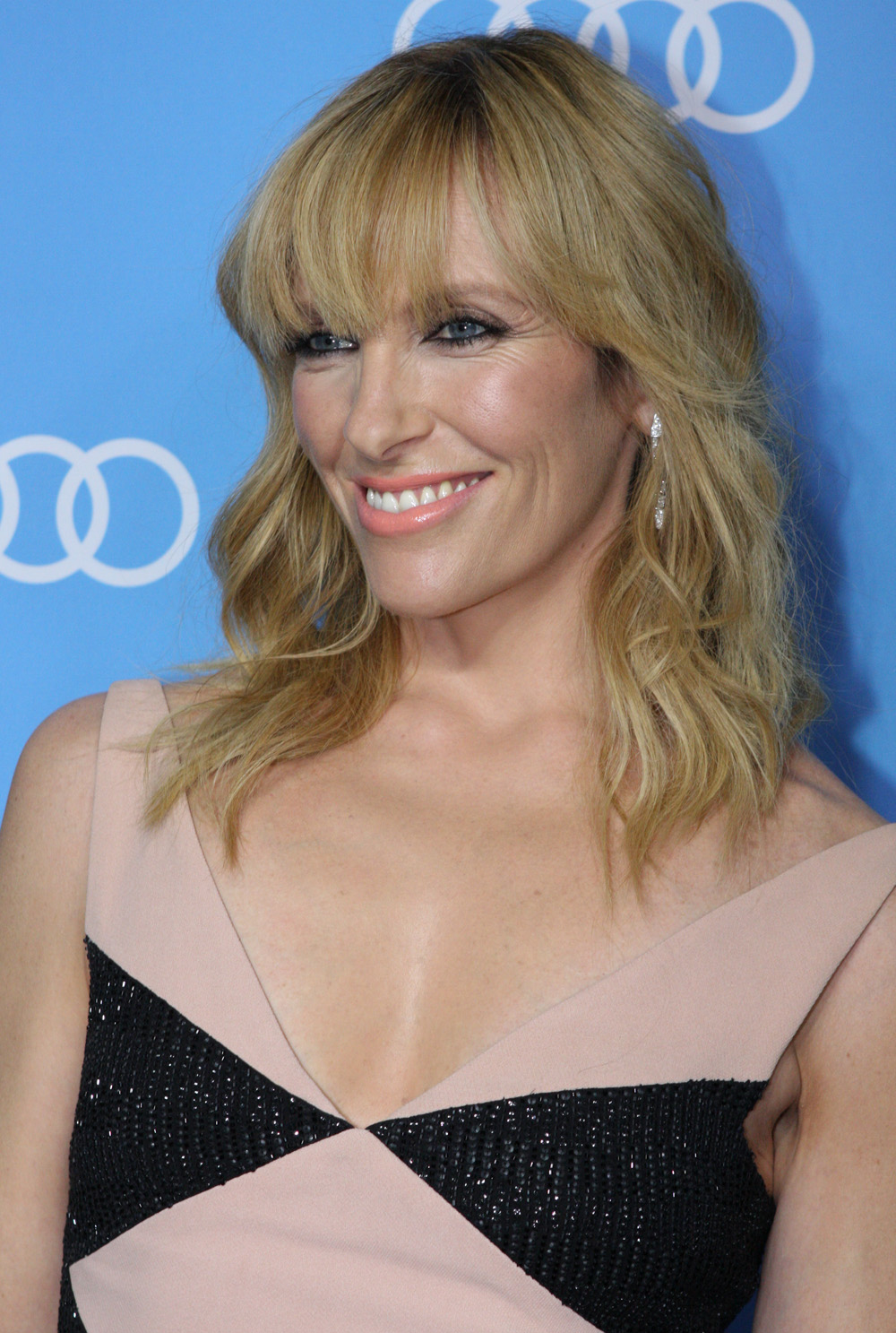
Toni Collette, star of Muriel's Wedding and Little Miss Sunshine

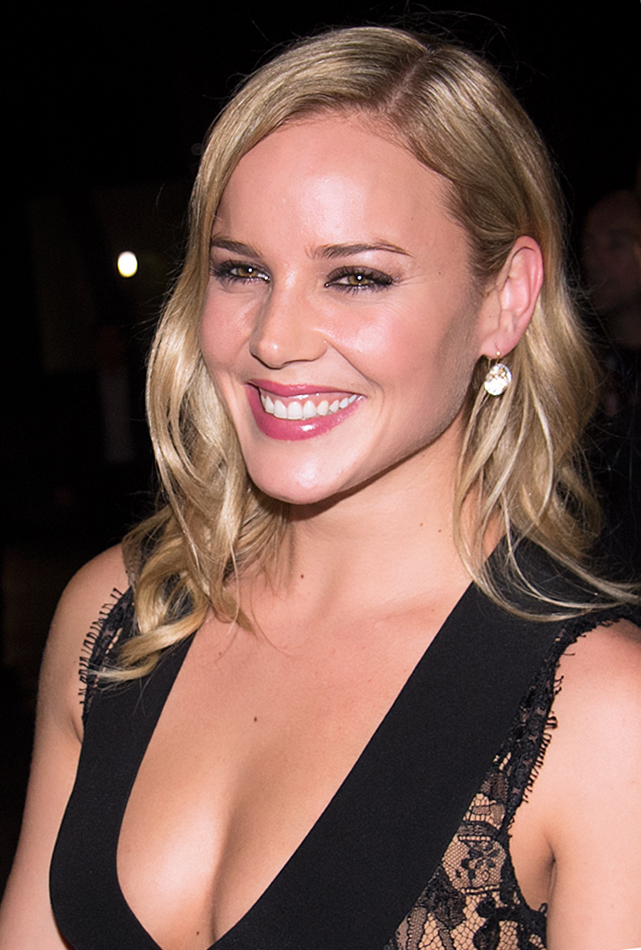
Abbie Cornish, star of Somersault and Sucker Punch

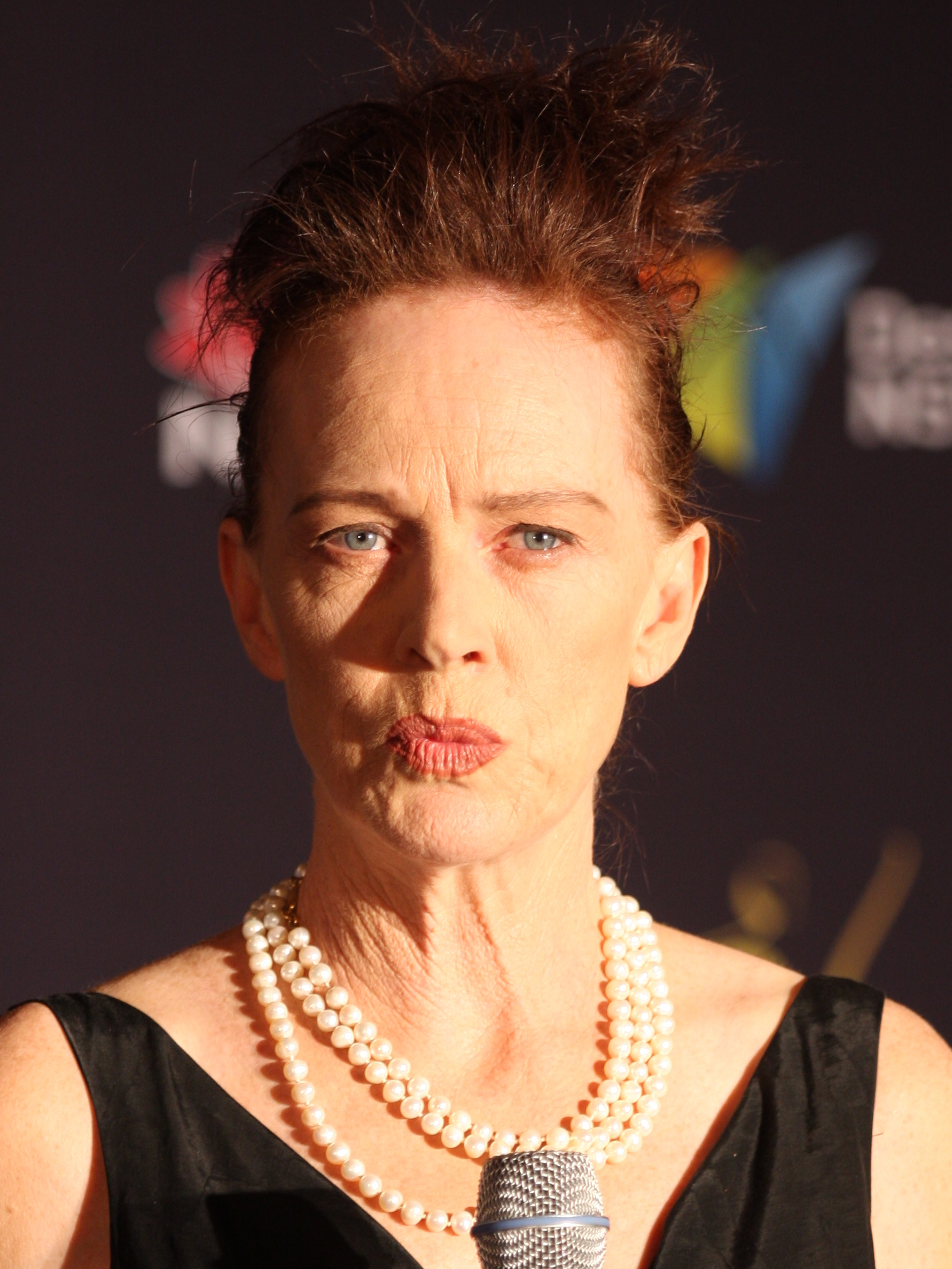
Judy Davis, star of The Dressmaker and Husbands and Wives

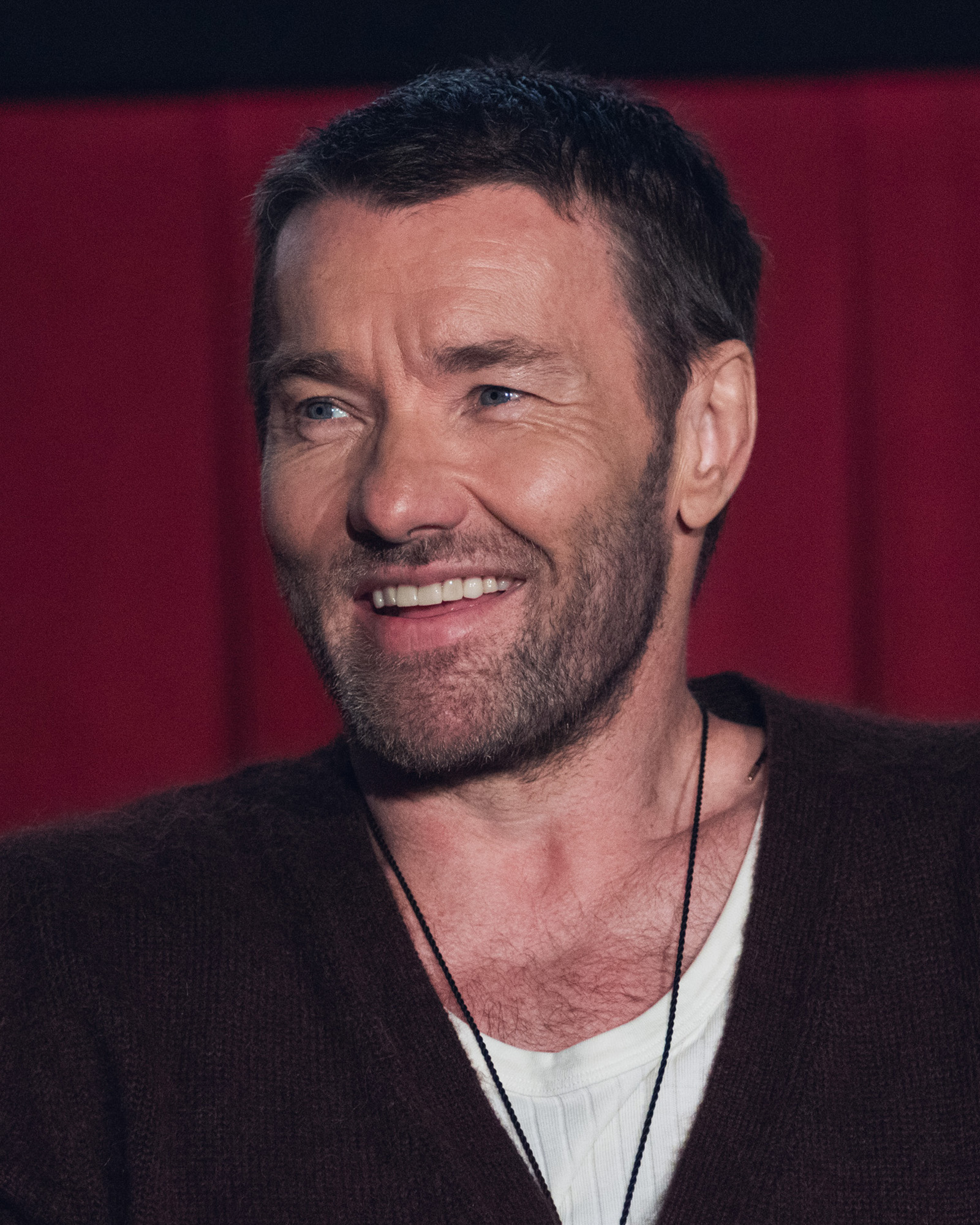
Joel Edgerton, star of Animal Kingdom and Loving

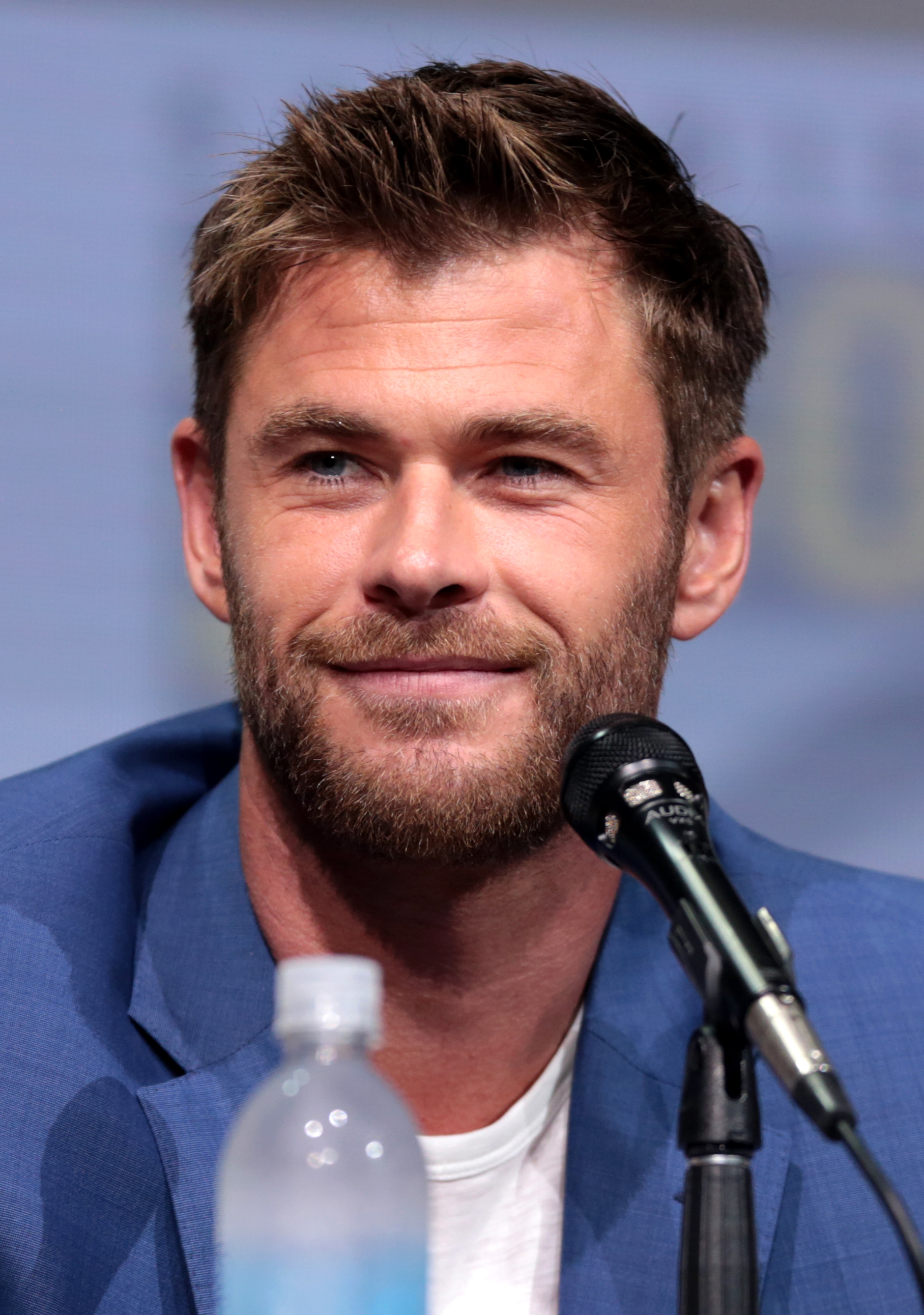
Chris Hemsworth, who has found success as Thor in the Marvel Cinematic Universe

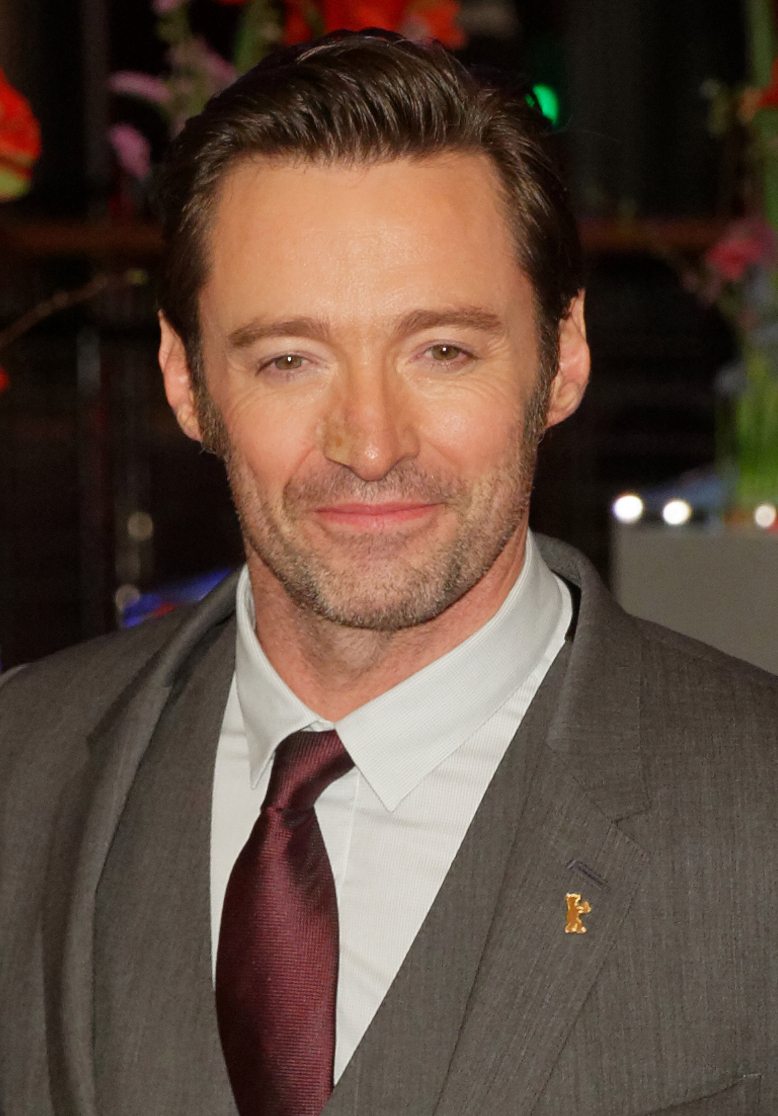
Hugh Jackman, who has found success as Logan / Wolverine in the X-Men film series

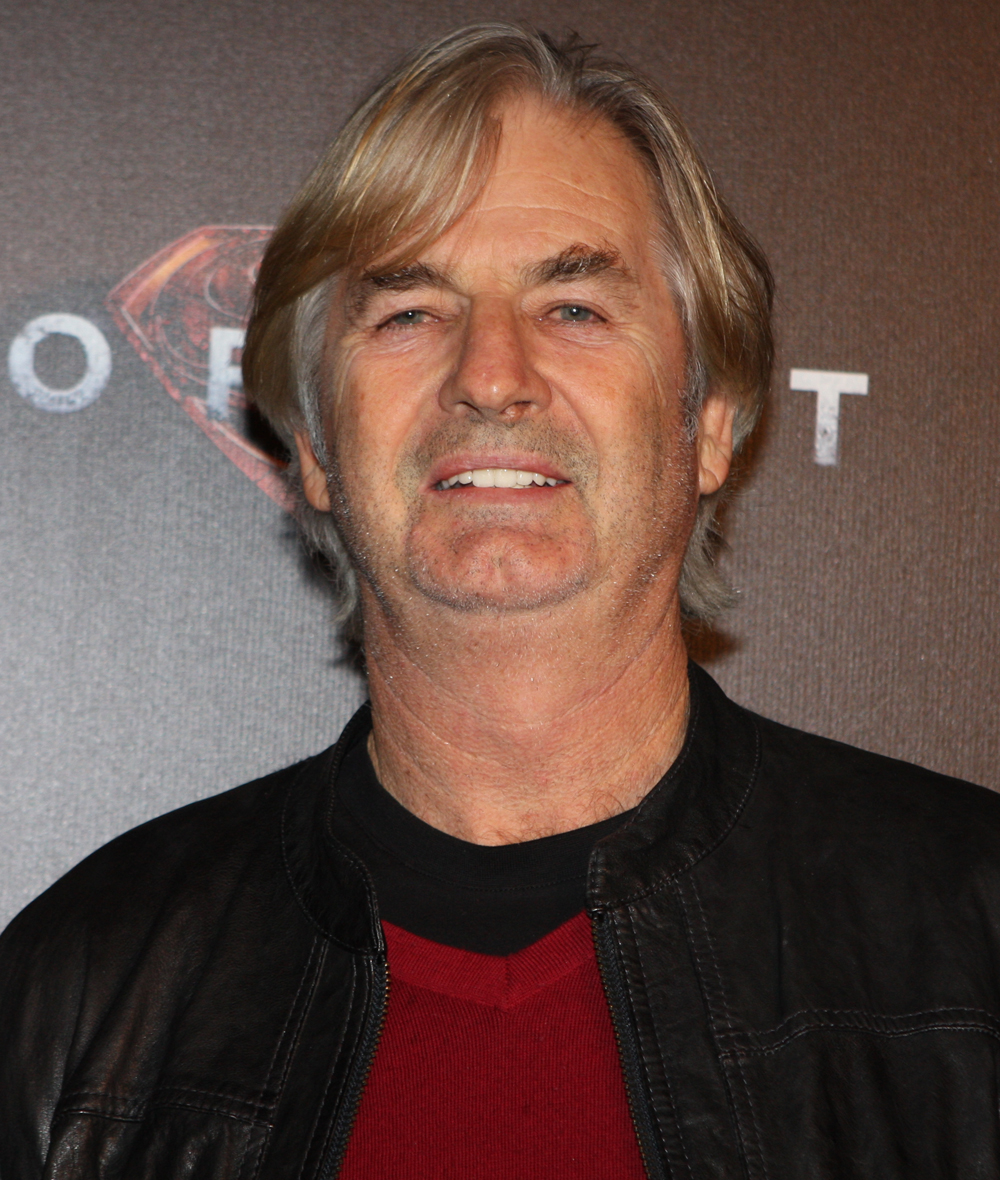
John Jarratt, star of Wolf Creek and Wolf Creek 2

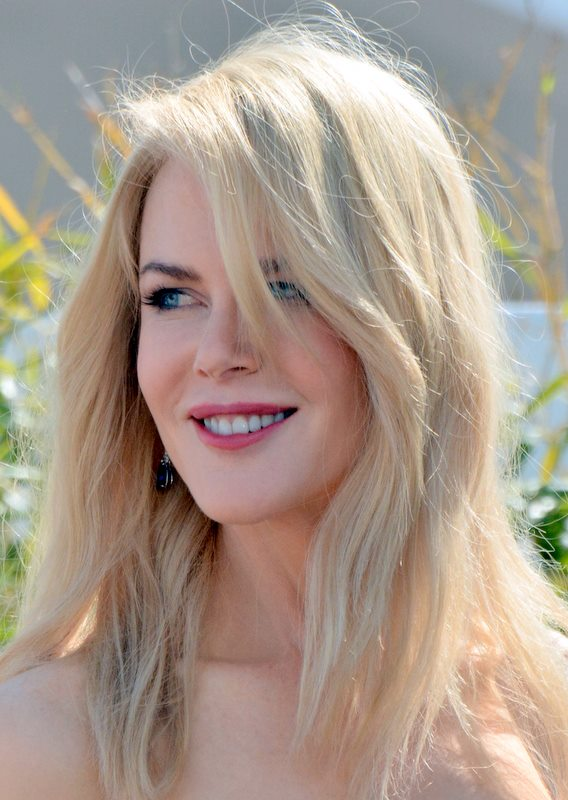
Nicole Kidman, the first Australian to win the Academy Award for Best Actress and one of Hollywood's highest paid performers.

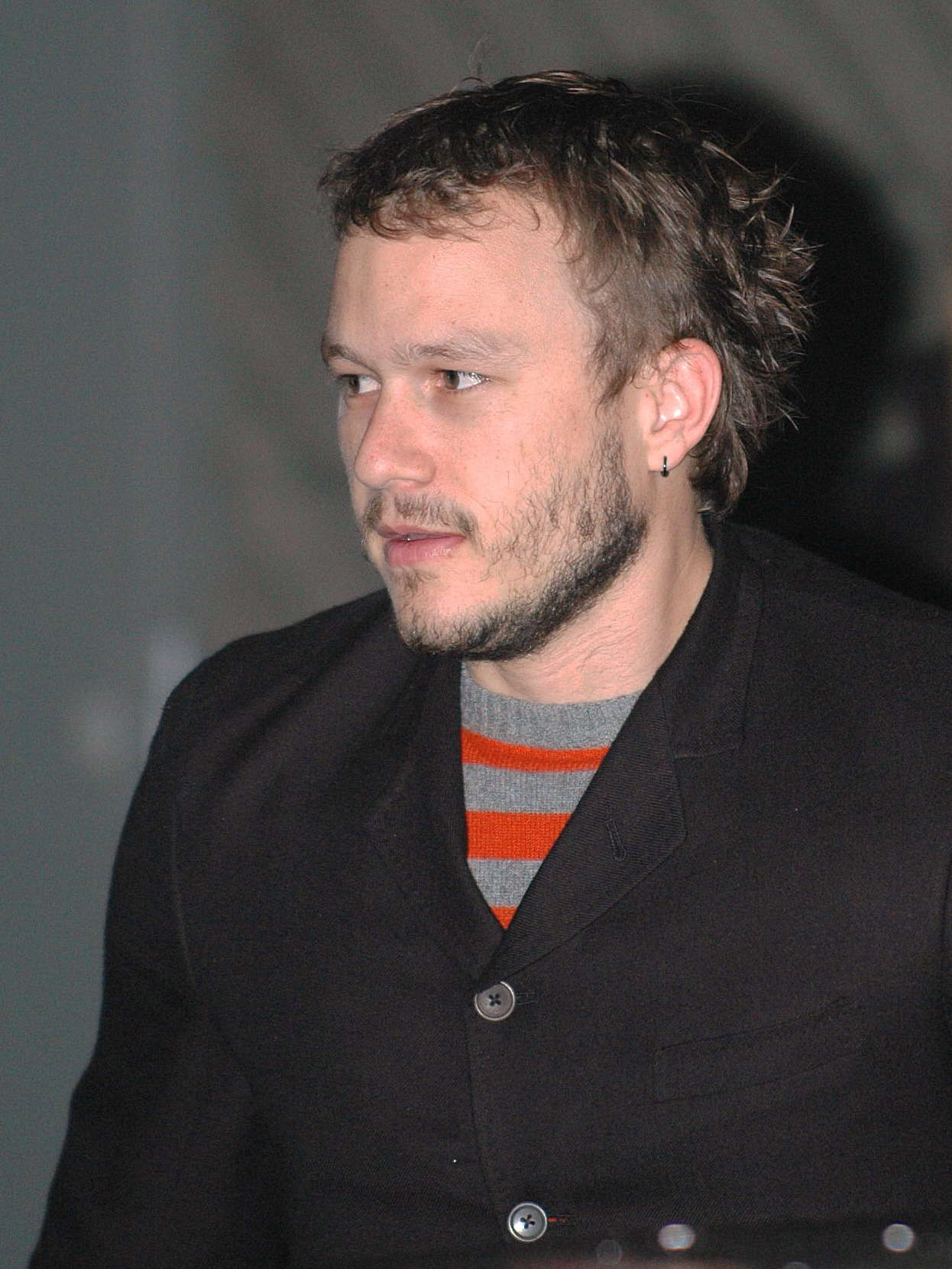
Heath Ledger, star of Brokeback Mountain and The Dark Knight

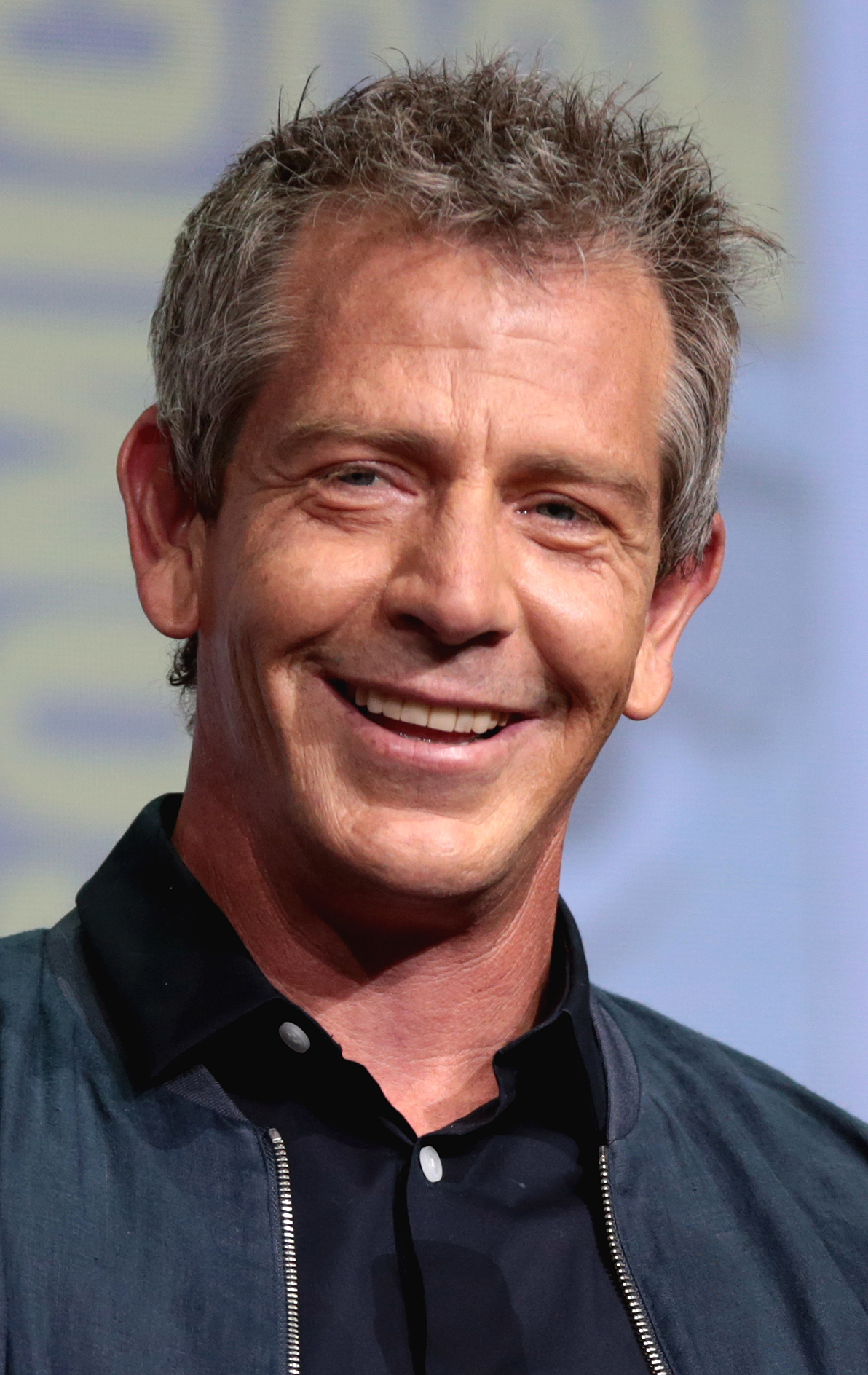
Ben Mendelsohn, star of Animal Kingdom and Mississippi Grind

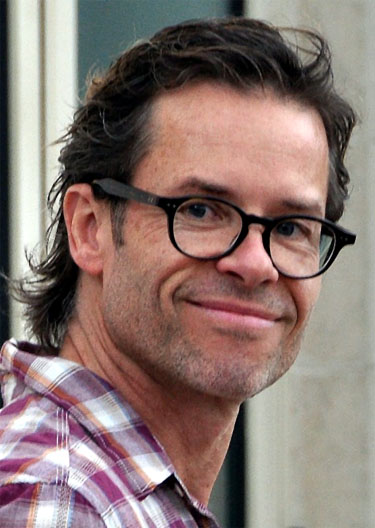
Guy Pearce, star of Memento and The Rover

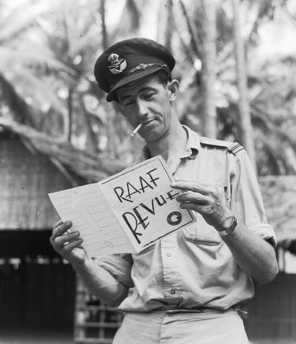
Chips Rafferty, star of The Overlanders and Wake in Fright

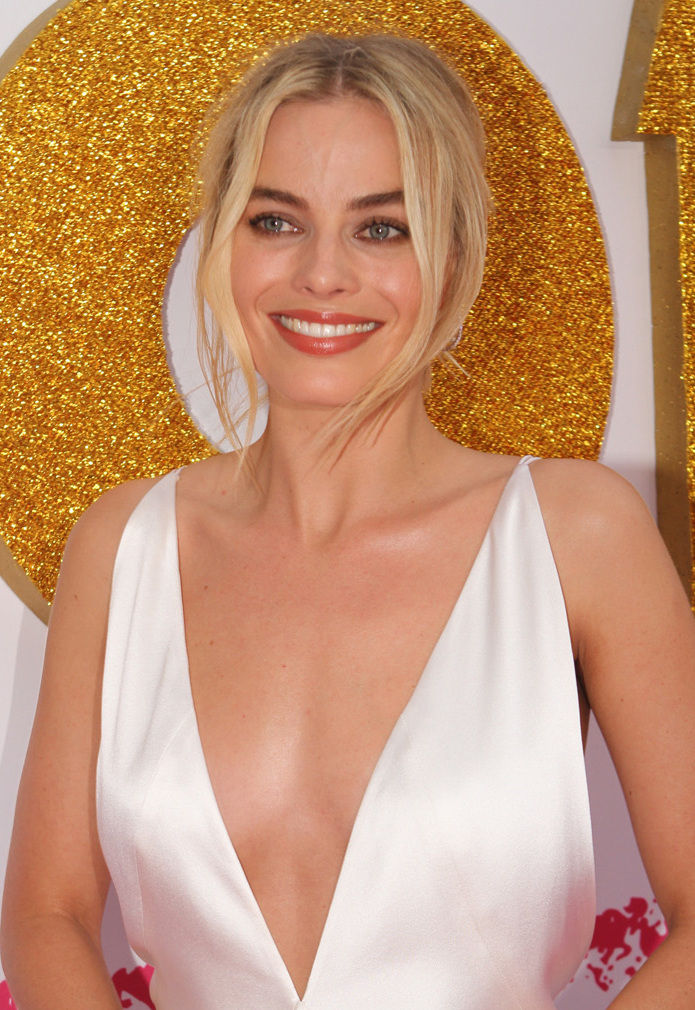
Margot Robbie, star of The Wolf of Wall Street, Suicide Squad and Barbie.

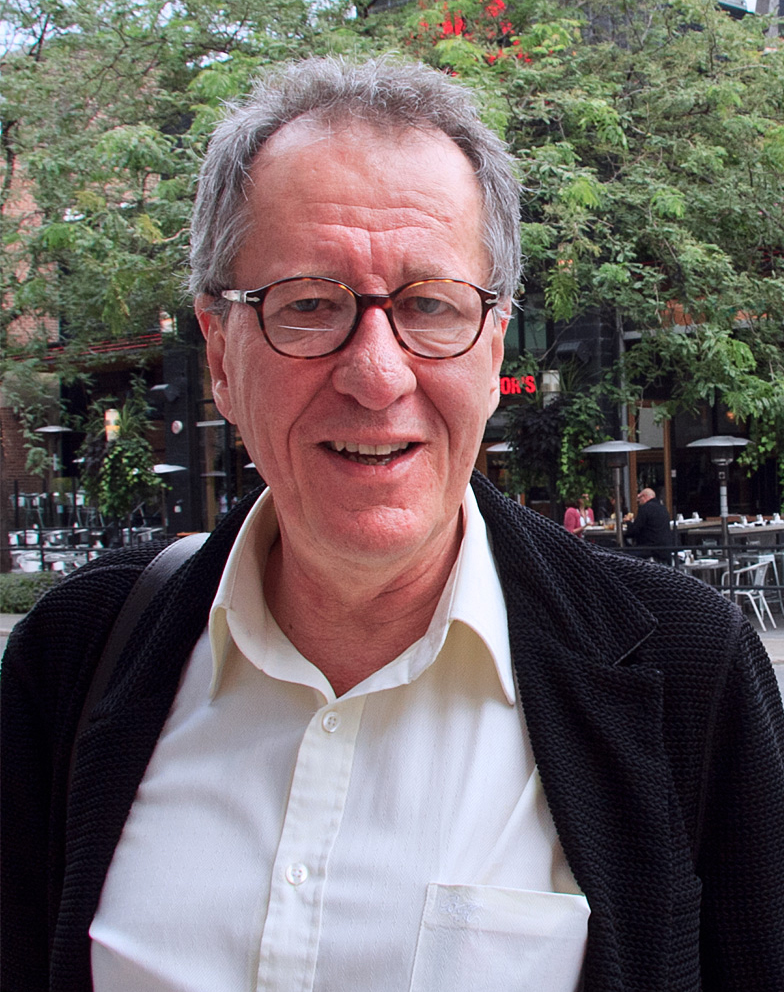
Geoffrey Rush, the first Australian to win an Academy Award, Primetime Emmy Award, Tony Award, and Golden Globe Award

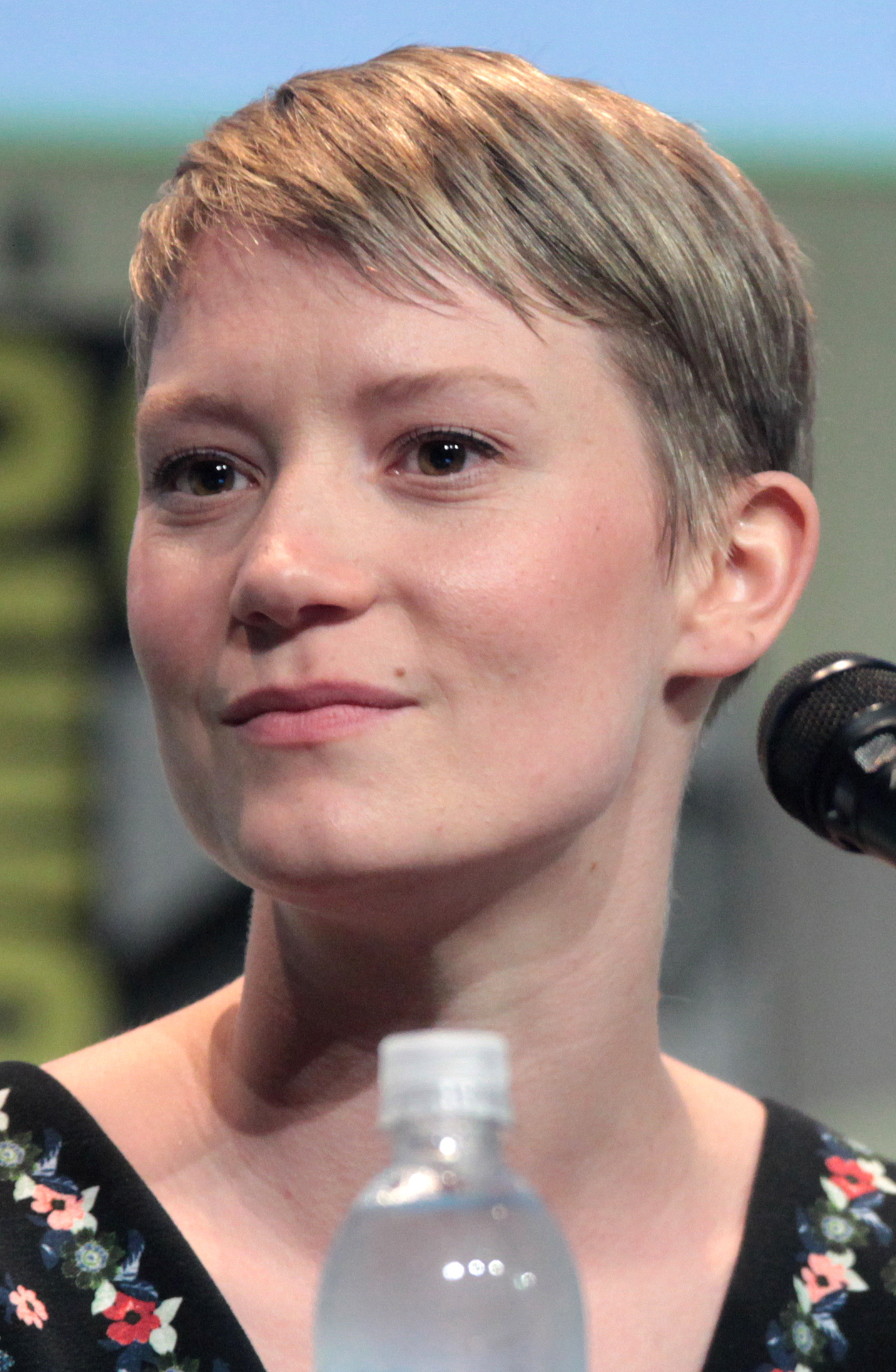
Mia Wasikowska, star of Alice in Wonderland and The Kids Are All Right

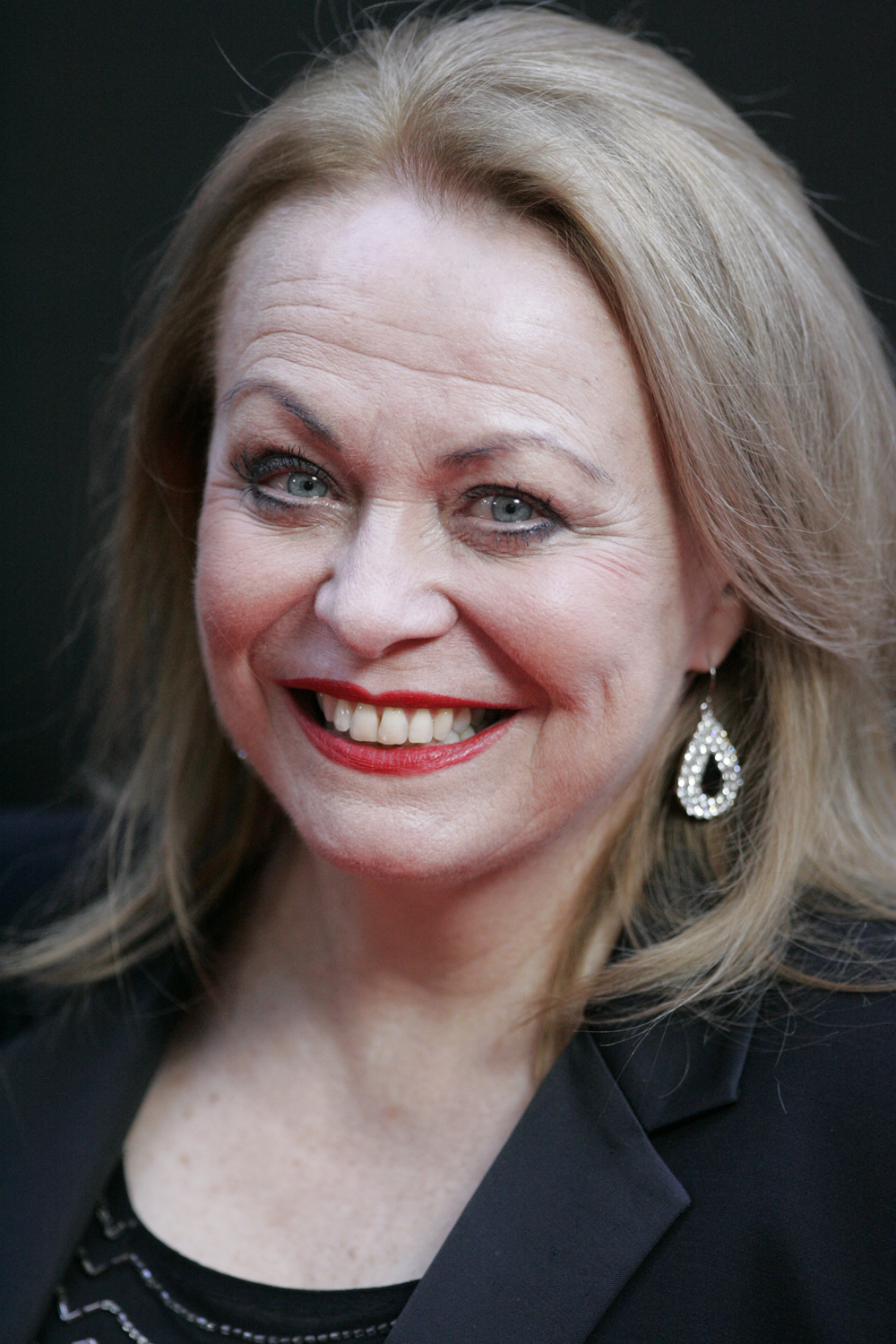
Jacki Weaver, star of Animal Kingdom and Caddie

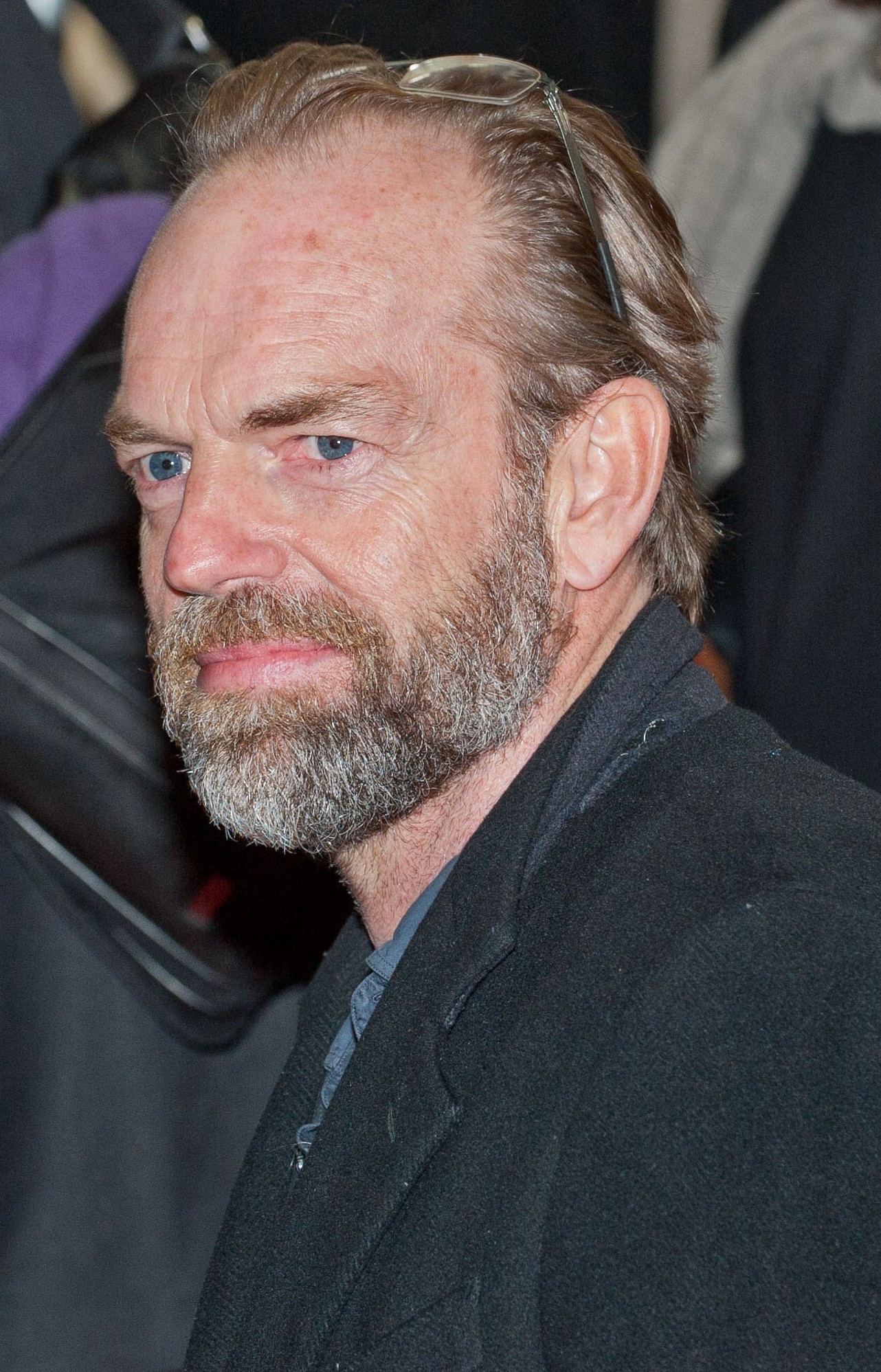
Hugo Weaving, star of Captain America: The First Avenger and The Matrix

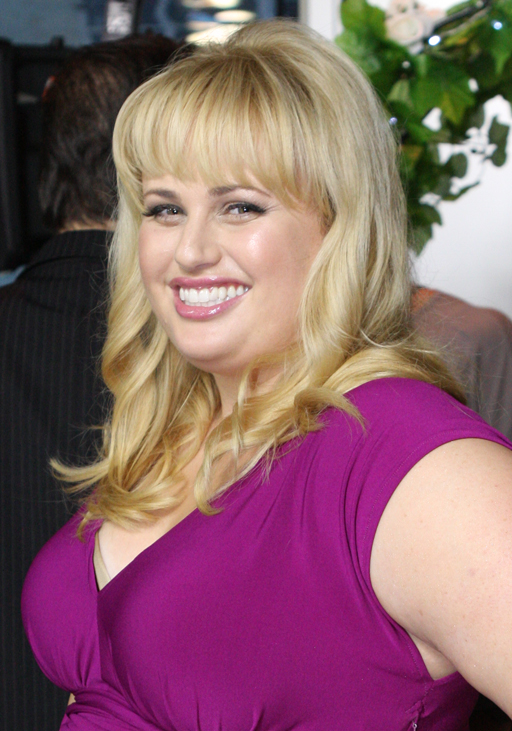
Rebel Wilson, star of Pitch Perfect

The Australian film industry has produced a number of successful actors, actresses, writers, directors and filmmakers many of whom have been known internationally.

Actors

- Oliver Ackland
- David Argue
- Simon Baker
- Dougie Baldwin
- Eric Bana
- Steve Bastoni
- Steve Bisley
- Jon Blake
- Graeme Blundell
- Grant Bowler
- Luke Bracey
- Bryan Brown
- Dieter Brummer
- Tom Burlinson
- Nathaniel Buzolic
- Michael Caton
- Jason Clarke
- Robert Coleby
- Vince Colosimo
- Ryan Corr
- Rodger Corser
- Jai Courtney
- Brendan Cowell
- Russell Crowe
- Max Cullen
- Stephen Curry
- Bernard Curry
- Cameron Daddo
- Alan Dale
- Kieran Darcy-Smith
- Matt Day
- Adam Demos
- Ed Devereaux
- Alex Dimitriades
- Ernie Dingo
- Firass Dirani
- Jason Donovan
- Matt Doran
- Michael Dorman
- Joel Edgerton
- Christopher Egan
- Jacob Elordi
- Alexander England
- Dan Ewing
- Eamon Farren
- Cody Fern
- Daniel Feuerriegel
- Maurie Fields
- Travis Fimmel
- Peter Finch
- Errol Flynn
- David Franklin
- James Frecheville
- Colin Friels
- Adam Garcia
- Dean Geyer
- Mel Gibson
- Max Gillies
- Daniel Goddard
- Marcus Graham
- Harry Greenwood
- David Gulpilil
- Kick Gurry
- Kim Gyngell
- Anthony Hayes
- Mark Hembrow
- Chris Hemsworth
- Liam Hemsworth
- Luke Hemsworth
- Damon Herriman
- David Hoflin
- Paul Hogan
- Craig Horner
- Mitchell Hope
- Barry Humphries
- Bill Hunter
- Louis Hunter
- Steve Irwin
- Hugh Jackman
- Shane Jacobson
- John Jarratt
- Nathan Jones
- Hugh Keays-Byrne
- Sean Keenan
- Graham Kennedy
- Joe Klocek
- Ryan Kwanten
- Anthony LaPaglia
- Jonathan LaPaglia
- Daniel Lapaine
- Ben Lawson
- Josh Lawson
- George Lazenby
- Heath Ledger
- Mark Lee
- Andrew Lees
- Ewen Leslie
- Lincoln Lewis
- Daniel Lissing
- Mark Little
- Tom Long
- Keiynan Lonsdale
- Daniel MacPherson
- Robert Mammone
- Costas Mandylor
- Louis Mandylor
- Justin Melvey
- Callan McAuliffe
- Andrew McFarlane
- Leo McKern
- Craig McLachlan
- Julian McMahon
- Ray Meagher
- John Meillon
- Ben Mendelsohn
- Paul Mercurio
- Levi Miller
- Tim Minchin
- Luke Mitchell
- Dacre Montgomery
- Bob Morley
- Callan Mulvey
- Matt Nable
- Matthew Newton
- John Noble
- Peter O'Brien
- James O'Halloran
- Alex O'Loughlin
- Barry Otto
- Ed Oxenbould
- Matt Passmore
- Steve Peacocke
- Guy Pearce
- Thaao Penghlis
- Peter Phelps
- Dominic Purcell
- Wayne Pygram
- Ingo Rademacher
- Chips Rafferty
- Tristan Rogers
- Tim Ross
- Richard Roxburgh
- Jake Ryan
- Jay Ryan
- Geoffrey Rush
- Angus Sampson
- Benedict Samuel
- Xavier Samuel
- Toby Schmitz
- Yahoo Serious
- Anthony Simcoe
- Jaason Simmons
- Jeremy Sims
- Troye Sivan
- Kodi Smit-McPhee
- Bruce Spence
- Jesse Spencer
- Sullivan Stapleton
- Gary Sweet
- Nick Tate
- Noah Taylor
- Robert Taylor
- Rod Taylor
- Jack Thompson
- Brenton Thwaites
- Charles Tingwell
- Lani Tupu
- Rhys Wakefield
- John Waters
- Hugo Weaving
- David Wenham
- Leigh Whannell
- Sam Worthington
- Dan Wyllie
- Lincoln Younes
- Aden Young

Actresses

- Milly Alcock
- Judith Anderson
- Celeste Barber
- Jacinda Barrett
- Lorraine Bayly
- Daisy Betts
- Claudia Black
- Cate Blanchett
- Rebecca Breeds
- Ashleigh Brewer
- Emily Browning
- Rose Byrne
- Gia Carides
- Zoe Carides
- Danielle Carter
- Anne Charleston
- Bianca Chiminello
- Diane Cilento
- Justine Clarke
- Adelaide Clemens
- Toni Collette
- Alyssa-Jane Cook
- Abbie Cornish
- Isabelle Cornish
- Ruth Cracknell
- Linda Cropper
- Ashleigh Cummings
- Lynette Curran
- Kimberley Davies
- Essie Davis
- Judy Davis
- Jessica De Gouw
- Olivia DeJonge
- Emilie de Ravin
- Portia de Rossi
- Elizabeth Debicki
- Alycia Debnam-Carey
- Jeanie Drynan
- Harriet Dyer
- Courtney Eaton
- Gigi Edgley
- Belinda Emmett
- Alice Englert
- Indiana Evans
- Janet Fielding
- Rhiannon Fish
- Isla Fisher
- Lucy Fry
- Deborra-Lee Furness
- Megan Gale
- Nadine Garner
- Melissa George
- Rachel Griffiths
- Yerin Ha
- Noni Hazlehurst
- Bella Heathcote
- Cariba Heine
- Virginia Hey
- Raelee Hill
- Claire Holt
- Wendy Hughes
- Anna Hutchison
- Natalie Imbruglia
- Stephanie Jacobsen
- Melissa Jaffer
- Mallory Jansen
- Kimberley Joseph
- Adelaide Kane
- Claudia Karvan
- Asher Keddie
- Nathalie Kelley
- Nicole Kidman
- Asher Keddie
- Shiori Kutsuna
- Dichen Lachman
- Lisa Lackey
- Katherine Langford
- Josephine Langford
- Abbey Lee
- Sophie Lowe
- Isabel Lucas
- Lottie Lyell
- Danielle Macdonald
- Tammy MacIntosh
- Elle Macpherson
- Deborah Mailman
- Jessica Marais
- Miriam Margolyes
- Natalie Mendoza
- Catherine McClements
- Jacqueline McKenzie
- Robin McLeavy
- Dannii Minogue
- Kylie Minogue
- Pia Miranda
- Radha Mitchell
- Sophie Monk
- Poppy Montgomery
- Judy Morris
- Jessica Napier
- Robyn Nevin
- Olivia Newton-John
- Frances O'Connor
- Miranda Otto
- Teresa Palmer
- Leah Purcell
- Susie Porter
- Angourie Rice
- Rebecca Rigg
- Rebecca Riggs
- Margot Robbie
- Ruby Rose
- Greta Scacchi
- Eliza Scanlen
- Peta Sergeant
- Pallavi Sharda
- Sia
- Sarah Snook
- Danielle Spencer
- Caitlin Stasey
- Yael Stone
- Yvonne Strahovski
- Tammin Sursok
- Alyssa Sutherland
- Magda Szubanski
- Eliza Taylor
- Rachael Taylor
- Sigrid Thornton
- Sonia Todd
- Phoebe Tonkin
- Anna Torv
- Kylie Travis
- Holly Valance
- Claire van der Boom
- Sharni Vinson
- Leeanna Walsman
- Gemma Ward
- Rachel Ward
- Mia Wasikowska
- Naomi Watts
- Jacki Weaver
- Samara Weaving
- Madeleine West
- Peta Wilson
- Rebel Wilson
- Sarah Wynter
- Odessa Young

== See also ==
Genres & movements
- Australian New Wave
- Australian Western
- Ozploitation

Lists

- List of Australian films
- List of films set in Australia
- List of films shot in Adelaide
- List of films shot in Brisbane
- List of films shot in Melbourne
- List of films shot in Queensland
- List of films shot in Sydney
- List of films shot in Tasmania
- List of films shot in the Northern Territory
- List of films shot in Western Australia
- List of films shot on the Gold Coast
- List of films and television shows shot in Alice Springs

Organisations & institutions

- Ausfilm
- Australian Academy of Cinema and Television Arts
- Australian Cinematographers Society
- Australian Classification Board
- Australian College of the Arts
- Australian Directors' Guild
- Australian Film Commission
- Australian Film Development Corporation
- Australian Film, Television and Radio School
- Australian Screen Editors
- Australian Screen Sound Guild
- Australian Writers' Guild
- Disney Studios Australia
- Docklands Studios Melbourne
- Event Cinemas
- Film Finance Corporation Australia
- Hoyts
- Media, Entertainment and Arts Alliance
- National Film and Sound Archive
- National Institute of Dramatic Art
- Perth Film Studios
- Screen Australia
- Screen NSW
- Screen Producers Australia
- Screen Queensland
- Screen Queensland Studios
- Screen Tasmania
- Screenwest
- South Australian Film Corporation
- VicScreen
- Victorian College of the Arts
- Village Roadshow
- Village Roadshow Studios
- Warner Bros. Movie World
- WA Screen and Media Academy
- Western Australian Academy of Performing Arts

== Literature ==
=== Encyclopedia and reference ===
- Goldsmith, Ben, Ryan, Mark David, and Lealand, Geoff Eds. "Directory of World Cinema : Australia and New Zealand 2". Bristol: Intellect, 2014. ISBN 9781841506340
- G. A. Hills (18 December 1918). "Production of Moving Pictures". Australian Town and Country Journal. Vol. XCVIII, no. 2555. New South Wales, Australia. p. 20 – via National Library of Australia.
- Murray, Scott, ed. Australian Film: 1978–1994. Melbourne: Oxford University Press, 1995. ISBN 978-0-19-553777-2
- Pike, Andrew and Ross Cooper. Australian Film: 1900–1977. revised ed. Melbourne: Oxford University Press, 1998. ISBN 978-0-19-550784-3
- McFarland, Brian, Geoff Mayer and Ina Bertrand, eds. The Oxford Companion to Australian Film. Melbourne: Oxford University Press, 1999. ISBN 978-0-19-553797-0
- Moran, Albert and Errol Vieth. Historical Dictionary of Australian and New Zealand Cinema. Lanham, Md: Scarecrow Press, 2005. ISBN 978-0-8108-5459-8
- Reade, Eric. Australian Silent Films: A Pictorial History of Silent Films from 1896 to 1926. Melbourne: Lansdowne Press, 1970.
- Verhoeven, Deb, ed. Twin Peeks: Australian and New Zealand Feature Films. Melbourne: Damned Publishing, 1999. ISBN 978-1-876310-00-4

=== Critique and commentary ===
- Ryan, Mark David and Goldsmith, Ben, Australian Screen in the 2000s. Palgrave Macmillan, Cham, Switzerland. ISBN 978-3-319-48299-6
- Collins, Felicity, and Theresa Davis. Australian Cinema After Mabo. Sydney: Cambridge University Press, 2004.
- Dawson, Jonathan, and Bruce Molloy, eds. Queensland Images in Film and Television. Brisbane: University of Queensland Press, 1990.
- Dermody, Susan; Jacka, Elizabeth; eds. The Screening of Australia, Volume 1: Anatomy of a Film Industry. Sydney: Currency Press, 1987.
- Dermody, Susan; Jacka, Elizabeth; eds. The Screening of Australia, Volume 2: Anatomy of a National Cinema. Sydney: Currency Press, 1988.
- Moran, Albert and Tom O'Regan, eds. An Australian Film Reader (Australian Screen Series). Sydney: Currency Press, 1985.
- Moran, Albert and Errol Vieth. Film in Australia: An Introduction Sydney: Cambridge University Press, 2006.
- O'Regan, Tom. Australian National Cinema. London: Routledge, 1996.
- Ryan, Mark David (2008). "A dark new world : anatomy of Australian horror films". PhD Thesis, Queensland University of Technology. eprints.qut.edu.au. Archived from the original on 1 March 2011. pdf
- Ryan, Mark, David (2009),'Whither Culture? Australian Horror Films and the Limitations of Cultural Policy', Media International Australia: Incorporating Culture and Policy, no. 133, pp. 43–55. pdf
- Stratton, David. The Avocado Plantation: Boom and Bust in the Australian Film Industry. Sydney : Pan Macmillan, 1990. 465p. ISBN 978-0-7329-0250-6
- Verhoeven, Deb. Sheep and the Australian Cinema. Melbourne : MUP, 2006. ISBN 978-0-522-85239-4
