= Ehlers (surname) =

Ehlers is a German surname. Notable people with the surname include:

- Adriana Ehlers (1894–1972), Mexican filmmaker
- Anke Ehlers (born 1957), German psychologist
- Arthur Ehlers, executive in minor and Major League Baseball
- Beth Ehlers (born 1968), American actress
- Brian Ehlers (born 1978), American professional basketball player
- Bulbs Ehlers (1923–2013), American professional basketball player
- Daniela Ehlers (born 1992), German politician
- Dolores Ehlers (1896–1983), also known as Dolores Elhers, Mexican filmmaker and businessperson
- Edvard Ehlers (1863–1937), Danish dermatologist
- Eileen Ehlers, American politician
- Ekkehard Ehlers, an electronic musician
- Ernst Ehlers (1835–1925), a German zoologist
- Hanni Ehlers (born 1954), German translator
- Hans Ehlers (1914–1944), German fighter pilot
- Hermann Ehlers (1904–1954), a German politician
- Jürgen Ehlers (1929–2008), a German physicist
- Otto Ehrenfried Ehlers (1855–1895), a German traveller and writer
- Nikolaj Ehlers (born 1996), Danish ice hockey player
- Sebastian Ehlers (born 1982), German politician
- Tom Ehlers (born 1952), American football player
- Vern Ehlers (1934–2017), American politician
- Walter D. Ehlers (1921–2014), American Medal of Honour recipient
- Uwe Ehlers (born 1975), German footballer
