= Ehlers =

Ehlers may refer to:

- Ehlers–Danlos syndrome
- Ehlers (surname)

== See also ==
- Ehler
