= Constable Care =

Originally conceived in 1989, the Constable Care Child Safety Foundation is a not-for-profit community organisation working in partnership with the Western Australia Police, to educate children and young people in primary and secondary schools across the State about personal safety, crime prevention, ethics and good decision making. Constable Care is a nationally registered harm prevention charity and utilises a range of educational approaches to engage and empower young people, including theatre-in-education and applied theatre, technology and film based content.

The Constable Care Child Safety Foundation tours throughout Western Australia delivering interactive theatre workshops, plays and puppet theatre programs. Based in Maylands, Western Australia, the organisation employs professional actors who visit over 700 schools a year including remote indigenous community schools. The performances are supported by curriculum-linked classroom resources and tailored to the learning needs of students from pre-primary to Year 12, covering topics such as bullying, cybersafety, alcohol and drug abuse, protective behaviours, racism, road safety, relationship violence and mental health. Students' change in knowledge, attitude and behavioural intent towards each topic is measured pre and post incursion through evaluation processes developed through University-led research partnerships.

As of December 2021, over 3 million Western Australian children had participated in a Constable Care performance, with around 80,000 students taking part each year. The Constable Care brand celebrated its 30th anniversary in 2019 and has now performed for three generations of WA children.

In 2021, Constable Care rebranded the organisation as the Constable Care Foundation, removing the words Child Safety from its name and reducing its stable of brands down to just two; one representing its primary school-age work (Constable Care) and one its secondary school-age activity (Youth Choices). All Constable Care Foundation programs are now promoted under one or other of these brands.

== Youth Choices ==
In late 2013 Constable Care launched its youth theatre brand Theatrical Response Group (TRG), a tongue-in-cheek nod to the organisation's long standing connection with WA Police. This was subsequently rebranded in 2021 to the current 'Youth Choices' brand as part of the organisation's branding renewal strategy. Youth Choices undertakes theatre workshops in WA's secondary schools and community youth organisations using applied theatre techniques to involve young people in discussion and problem-solving on social and safety issues such as cyberbullying, racism, relationship violence and alcohol and drug abuse. The organisation uses the Forum theatre approach developed by Brazilian Augusto Boal as its methodology for engaging students, and undertakes a significant number of touring workshops as well as a smaller number of in-residence extended school interventions each year. In September 2014 the organisation commenced delivering this program in remote Aboriginal schools in the Pilbara region, placing indigenous actors and facilitators in classrooms to work with students for up to 2 weeks at a time. The organisation now delivers a significant number of these "Youth Choices Intensives" programs in both Perth metropolitan and remote secondary schools each year. In 2019 the organisation introduced a new "Rapid Response" model to its Forum theatre lineup, creating performances that respond to emerging themes identified by the audience in real time. Actors obtain issue and scenario ideas directly from the youth audience and then present these for playback and discussion. The innovative model allows the organisation to work with young people on any emerging issue without notice, and removes most performance development lead time.

== Community Mascots ==
The Constable Care mascots can be seen at upwards of 60 community events across Perth and Western Australia each year, including Telethon events, the Perth Christmas Pageant, Perth Royal Show, City of Perth Skyworks, Perth's Anzac Day Remembrance, Joondalup Festival and many other metropolitan and regional events. The non-speaking mascot's role is to interact with children and families at events to provide a positive first experience of police for young children. The mascots and a trained helper undertake event walkarounds, stopping for photographs and giving away handouts such as stickers and cardboard police hats. The Constable Care mascot was recognised at a ceremony in June 2014 at the Western Australian Police Academy for 25 years of service to the WA community, receiving the regimental number 12020 and the status of Senior Constable. At a ceremony in August 2014, then Commissioner of WA Police Karl O'Callaghan presented the Constable Care mascot with a 25-year service medal. In May 2016 Western Australia Police filmed a video featuring the Constable Care mascot dancing with uniformed officers as part of the worldwide online Running Man Challenge. The video was published on the WA Police Facebook page and has been watched over 1.2 million times. In September 2017, in recognition of Western Australian Police 100 Years of Women in Policing celebrations, a new female mascot Constable Clare was introduced to complement the existing Constable Care mascot.

== City After Dark ==
In partnership with Western Australia Police and with corporate support from WA security company, NPB Security, Constable Care provides safety walking tours through the Perth CBD and Northbridge, Western Australia for groups of young people aged 15-25 years. Tours are run on weeknight evenings and are led by a WA Police Officer. They are designed to provide an experiential personal safety and risk identification education experience for teenagers who are visiting entertainment precincts at night with friends. The tours cover a wide range of potential risk and safety issues and the commentary is illustrated by the Police officer leading the tour with their own experiences and relevant crime statistics and case studies. The program commenced in 2019 and evaluation of outcomes continues to demonstrate that it is highly effective in changing knowledge, attitude and intent to behave for the 1,700+ young people who have taken part (as of 30 June 2022).

== Lost Child Services ==
The Constable Care Foundation provides lost child services at many Perth events, including the Perth Christmas Pageant, City of Perth Skyworks, Perth's Anzac Day ceremonies, Western Australia Day celebrations and many other family-oriented community events in Western Australia. The service distributes contact information stickers or armbands to families arriving at events so children can be quickly reunited with their parents should they become separated. It also provides highly visible staffed family meeting points within the event to locate missing children rapidly and with a minimum of trauma.

== Video Productions ==
In 2011, the organisation released "Constable Care and the A-Grades" debut single, entitled Merry Christmas, which achieved over 20,000 views on YouTube in its first month. This was the organisation's first foray into film making and was followed by two further Christmas videos in 2012 and 2013. The organisation started working in partnership in 2014 with Edith Cowan University WA Screen Academy on a series of online interactive youth crime prevention films under the banner "Your Call", with the first (#Emilywasted) on binge drinking among teenage girls released in June 2015. Three further interactive films on young male aggression (Shirtfront), car theft (Wreck) and mental health and drug use (Pressure) were released in September 2015, December 2015 and January 2016 respectively. In 2016 the organisation introduced a secondary schools' student competition to identify the storyline for each new film, with the winning entry then developed into the interactive film. In 2017 the organisation joined forces with the Western Australia Police SAY student film making contest to run a combined secondary school competition under a new "Your Say, Your Call" banner that allowed students to create a short film of their own for judging, with the winning entry then developed into the interactive film. The winning film submission for 2017 "Bottled Up" was developed by Edith Cowan University WA Screen Academy for both 360 degree virtual reality and traditional film mediums. Since 2018, the organisation has produced four additional Virtual reality interactive films, on personal safety at night (City After Dark), cybersafety (Zombie Run) and two films on cyberbullying (Bullying:Through the Maze and OverShare). In 2021 the Your Say, Your Call film program was rebranded under the Foundation's new Youth Choices sub-brand. All films are made available for free download from the Constable Care website and the organisation now undertakes secondary school incursions using the films with VR headsets as part of its in-school education program.

== Safety School ==
Constable Care commenced planning in late 2012 to build and operate a road and transport safety experiential learning centre for children aged 4–11 years at its site in Maylands. Thanks to the support of Lotterywest and a number of corporate sponsors, the 3,500 sqm centre was completed and opened in July 2017 and now provides a fully functioning urban streetscape for practical bike and pedestrian skills education. The centre includes working traffic signalling, rail crossing, school zone and scale buildings, lifesize bus and train models, a rail platform and working pedestrian crossing. It also incorporates an Augmented reality experience on iPad minis that enables children to identify and resolve pedestrian, bike and public transport safety risks overlaid on the environment, with results tracked in real time and linked to WA curriculum education outcomes. The $1.7 million Constable Care Safety School has been operating for primary school excursion groups since October 2017, and opened for family school holiday bookings in January 2018, with up to 10,000 children and adults attending each year.

== Ethics Pilot ==
In 2022 Constable Care partnered with NSW charity Primary Ethics to deliver a pilot program for Year 5 students in 12 WA public primary schools. Over 600 students took part in weekly ethical reasoning and critical thinking discussion groups throughout the school year, led by trained volunteers working from curriculum materials developed by Primary Ethics. The aim of the philanthropically funded pilot was to demonstrate the value in this skill building process for individual children, schools and parents, with a view to expanding the program to allow opt-in for all WA public schools across K-6 years in subsequent years. Constable Care is undertaking a robust evaluation of the evidence for benefit with the aim of establishing the program as a systemic evidence-based approach to harm and crime prevention.

== Patrons ==
Constable Care has two official patrons who attend its events and provide advice and support to the organisation. They are Commissioner of WA Police Col Blanch APM, and Western Australian Chief Justice Peter Quinlan.

== Board ==
The Board of Constable Care Foundation constitutes individuals drawn from business, academia, government, education, marketing, media, the arts and community services. The current board chair is Susan Fleming, managing director of ACT Australia.

== CEO ==
David Gribble is the chief executive officer of the Constable Care Foundation. He took over from former CEO Vick Evans in January 2011.

== Former Employees ==
Television personality Rove McManus was once a Constable Care performer, as were Australian film actors Mahesh Jadu and Phoenix Raei.

Vick Evans was the chief executive officer of the Constable Care Child Safety Foundation for 14 years from 1998 to early 2011. He was credited with generating initial corporate support and securing ongoing government funding for the program. Vick Evans was diagnosed with motor neurone disease in 2010 and died in April 2011. He was succeeded by current CEO, David Gribble.
