= Ehler =

Ehler may refer to:

- Carl Gottlieb Ehler (1685–1753), Prussian astronomer
- Christian Ehler (born 1963), German politician
- Dylan Ehler (born 2017), a child who mysteriously disappeared in 2020

== See also ==
- Ehlers (disambiguation)
