= Adriana Ehlers =

Mexican filmmaker (1894–1972)

- Born: Adriana Antonia Aurelia Ehlers Jiménez; September 28, 1894; Veracruz, Mexico
- Died: April 16, 1972 (aged 77); Guadalajara, Jalisco, Mexico
- Other names: Adriana Ehlers Jiménez, Adriana Elhers
- Occupations: Documentary newsreel filmmaker, film director, cinematographer, businessperson, photographer, educator
- Relatives: Dolores Ehlers (sister)

Adriana Ehlers (September 28, 1894 – April 16, 1972), was a Mexican documentary newsreel filmmaker, film director, cinematographer, businessperson, photographer, and educator. She and her sister Dolores Ehlers are pioneers in film, and are thought to be the first female filmmakers in Mexico. They were internationally known for their filmmaking, but were less known as public figures within Mexico during their lifetime. They had a filmmaking supply business out of their home, called Casa Ehlers; they had a film production company called Revistas Ehlers; and worked for the federal government of Mexico to establish the Department of Cinematography.

== Early life ==
Adriana Ehlers was born on September 28, 1894, in Veracruz, Mexico. She was raised during the Mexican Revolution (1910–1920) and she lost her father when she was young. Her mother earned money for the family with a job as a midwife. Due to economic problems within the family, she left school early.

== Career ==
The Ehlers sisters started a portrait studio at home, and they increasingly gained more customers and fame because of their unique style. They had the opportunity to make a portrait of President Venustiano Carranza in Veracruz. President Carranza gave them a scholarship to study photography in Boston. On September 4, 1916, the sisters arrived in the United States together by ship to Ellis Island, Adriana was 21 years old. The Ehlers sisters worked at Champlain Studios, a commercial photography studio and they went to an art academy for teachers in the evenings.

They received an extension of their travel scholarship, allowing them to study motion picture cinematography. They went to work for the Army Medical Museum in Washington D.C.. The government had given the museum money to make films to teach American soldiers of World War I about health issues. The Elhers sisters learned a lot about making films, including recording and developing images. Ultimately, they were both able to complete their studies at the Universal Pictures Company in Jacksonville, New Jersey.

In 1919, the Ehlers returned to Mexico. There they started selling from their home film equipment from the Nicholas Power Company in Mexico City, a business they named 'Casa Ehlers'. They were soon appointed by the Mexican Ministry of Government headed by a new government, led by President Adolfo de la Huerta; with Adriana promoted as "Chief of the Censorship Department" within the new Department of Cinematography. The government also included a film laboratory for developing the documentary films. Dolores promoted as "Chief of the Department of Cinematography". The sisters made several documentary films to show the beauty of Mexico. They filmed parties and parades, and the landscapes of Mexico, such as the caves of Cacahuamilpa. They worked on this for months and traveled throughout Mexico with their camera equipment. They developed the films in the lab; and the films were played at schools and organizations.

After President Venustiano Carranza was assassinated and Álvaro Obregón became president in 1920, both sisters lost their jobs. They had been protected by Carranza and that protection disappeared after his death. They continued to make films. One film was for the International Petroleum Company (IPC), and was shown in the United States in 1922. From 1922 to 1929, they released new films every week with their own production company under the name Revistas Ehlers with images of current events or activities such as natural disasters, protests or parties. They then sold these films directly to exhibitors. They also continued to sell filmmaking equipment out of their home. They founded a cinema union (Spanish: Sindico Cinematografico, lit. 'Film Syndicate'), and they were part of the Confederación Regional de Obreros Mexicanos (CROM).

The Ehlers sisters' films were first stored by the Mexican government. They were then moved to the National Archives and then to the National Film Library. The images were lost there in a fire in 1982. She is included in the Women Film Pioneers Project.

== Filmography ==
- El agua potable en la ciudad de México (1920)
- La industria del petróleo (1920)
- Un passé en tranvía en la ciudad de México (1920)
- Real España vs. Real Madrid (1921)
- Postal service in Mexico (1921)
- Museo de Arqueología (1921)
- Las pirámides de Teotihuacán (1921)
