= Women Film Pioneers Project =

Online profiles of Women in Film in the silent era

Women Film Pioneers Project is a freely accessible, collaborative, online-only database resource, produced with support from Columbia University.

== Development ==
Women Film Pioneers Project (OCLC 860910596) was founded in 1993, by Jane Gaines, a film scholar and visiting professor at Vassar College, when Gaines joined the Film & Media Studies Program at Columbia University, officially launching in October 2013 as an online-only resource, produced in partnership with Columbia University Libraries, with support from Columbia University, School of the Arts, Film Program.

== Resources ==
Individual profiles rely on primary documents, digitized resources, film prints, paper collections, government records, other archival materials, and family recollections and memoirs.

Overview essays are longer, peer-reviewed, essays that go beyond a single individual.

== Management ==
By 2016, Kate Saccone had become Project Manager.

== Contributors ==
Contributors, among the more than 200, include:

- Richard Abel
- Kay Armatage
- Rebecca Barry
- Livia Bloom
- Kelly Brown
- Julie Buck
- Sofia Bull
- Barbara Hall
- Jane Gaines
- Margaret Hennefeld
- Joanne Hershfield
- Annette Kuhn
- Kendra Preston Leonard
- Jill Julius Matthews
- Jan Olsson
- Karen Pearlman
- Louis Pelletier
- Kathryn Fuller-Seeley
- Shelley Stamp
- Tom Trusky
- Julia Tuñón
- Deb Verhoeven
- Xin Peng
- Robert von Dassanowsky

== Critical reception ==
"It wasn’t until a wave of scholarship arrived in the nineteen-nineties—the meticulous research done by the Women Film Pioneers Project, at Columbia, has been particularly important—that women’s outsized role in the origins of moviemaking came into focus again."—Margaret Talbot

"The Women Film Pioneers Project at Columbia University must be credited with undertaking and compiling much of the research to date."—Melody Bridges and Cheryl Robson

"There is criminally little research and writing on the often astounding careers of female editors. The same might well be said about many of their male counterparts, since most editors do tend to be unseen artists. Yet men came to dominate the field by the late 1920s and continue that hegemony today. Recent historians’ efforts have reclaimed some attention for many female filmmakers, especially in the area of silent film studies. The Women Film Pioneers Project at Columbia University (wfpp.cdrs.columbia.edu) is one of the best. Through efforts like this it is now well known that many women played central roles in the founding of the film industry."—Betsy A. McLane

== See also ==
- Center for Digital Research and Scholarship
