= Carl Gottlieb Ehler =

18th-century Prussian astronomer and mayor of Danzig

Carl Gottlieb Ehler (8 September 1685 – 22 November 1753) is considered a mathematician, specifically due to his post as an astronomer in Berlin. He was mayor of the Prussian capital of Danzig from March 1741 until his death. Carl Gottlieb Ehler corresponded with mathematical figures such as Gottfried Wilhelm Leibniz and Leonhard Euler, whose contributions continued the development of graph theory and number theory.

== Career ==
Much of his early life remains a mystery though it can be inferred from his posts later in life that he received an education given to privileged children. From this education, Ehler ventured on to Paris, and after a brief stay to Berlin, which is where his life changed. In Berlin, he took the post of astronomer, and while researching in Berlin, he met Gottfried Wilhelm Leibniz. This meeting would forever change Carl Gottlieb. Ehler would eventually send Leibniz both his own astronomical observations as well as a book produced by the converted catholic, Isaac Papin. This helpful correspondence allowed Leibniz to respond to Papin's new use of skeptical arguments. The response was not quite what Papin had hoped for, and Leibniz instead wrote that the use of good logic is the combat of skepticism.

Ehler forged a friendship with fellow Prussian mathematician Heinrich Kühn. This friendship would then blossom into a correspondence with another mathematician, Leonhard Euler. The correspondence initially began in March 1735 with a letter sent by Ehler to Euler. The correspondence itself is lost, but we can find the main thread of their relationship with Euler's first letter of response. In the letter, Euler talks of the problem of the Seven Bridges of Königsberg, a problem that Ehler brought to Euler's attention. The reason for such an inquiry was the desire by Kühn and Ehler to encourage mathematical advancements within Prussia. A letter from Ehler to Euler from March 1736 reads:

“You would render to me and our friend Kühn a most valuable service, putting us greatly in your debt, most learned sir, if you would send us the solution, which you know well, to the problem of the seven Königsberg bridges together with a proof. It would prove to an outstanding example of the calculus of position [Calculi Situs] worthy of your great genius. I have added a sketch of the said bridges”.

Euler replied to Ehler and Kühn in April 1736:

“Thus you see, most noble sir, how this type of solution bears little relationship to mathematics and I do not understand why you expect a mathematician to produce it rather than anyone else, for the solution is based on reason alone, and its discovery does not depend on any mathematical principle. Because of this, I do not know why even questions which bear so little relationship to mathematics are solved more quickly by mathematicians than by others. In the meantime most noble sir, you have a assigned this question to the geometry of position but I am ignorant as to what this new discipline involves, and as to which types of problem Leibniz and Wolff expected to see expressed this way.”

While this letter seems to suggest Euler's reluctance to tackle such problem, Kühn and Ehler had piqued his intellectual curiosity by proposing that the solution is part of a new style of mathematics. Euler solved the problem, contributing to the new mathematical genre Leibniz had named geometria situs, and laying the foundations of topology.

Along with the correspondence between mathematicians, Ehler also takes his place in history by his post as mayor of Danzig. He was mayor three different times, first in 1741, then in 1745, and finally in 1751. After overseeing the mayoral office of Danzig for the third and final time, Ehler retired to private life and died in 1753.
