= WA Screen and Media Academy =

West Australian tertiary arts school

Coordinates: 31°58′49.15″S 115°49′08.72″E

The WA Screen and Media Academy, formerly Western Australian Screen Academy (WASA; WA Screen Academy), is a film school( established in 2005) situated within the School of Communications and Arts at Edith Cowan University in Perth, Western Australia. It operates in partnership Western Australian Academy of Performing Arts.

== Description ==
The WA Screen and Media Academy, formerly known as Western Australian Screen Academy, when it was also known as WA Screen Academy or WASA, offers advanced-level training programs in screen production, operating in a partnership with the Western Australian Academy of Performing Arts (WAAPA). Its program is delivered on the Mount Lawley campus of Edith Cowan University.

WASA is a full member of CILECT (the International Association of Film and Television Schools).

The school partners with industry media organisations such as Seven Network, Nine Network, ABC, Nova radio, Bus Stop Films, and the Revelation Film Festival.

== Courses ==
As of 2025, WA Screen and Media Academy offers the following courses:

- Bachelor of Journalism and Broadcast Media
- Bachelor of Screen Production
- Graduate Certificate in Media Strategy and Leadership
- Graduate Certificate in News and Entertainment Media
- Graduate Certificate in Screen Creative Technologies
- Graduate Certificate in Screen Production
- Graduate Certificate in Scripted Screen Production
- Graduate Diploma in News and Entertainment Media
- Graduate Diploma in Screen Production
- Master of News and Entertainment Media
- Master of Screen Production

== Achievements ==
- 2017: The doco On My Terms selected for the St Kilda Film Festival
- 2017: Short film Dark Horses selected for St Kilda Film Festival, Beverly Hills Film Festival, Next Gen Short Film Festival, WA Unlocked Film Festival, London Independent Film Festival; winner of 5 awards
- 2011: Graduate Sam Barrett directs feature film Sororal
- 2010: Graduate Sam Barrett directs feature film Esoterica
- 2010: The doco Painful Bliss is selected for the Bondi Short Film Festival
- 2010: Short film Stuffed wins ATOM Award for Best Tertiary Short Fiction
- 2010: Ten films and docos selected for the Dungog Film Festival
- 2010: Academy Director John Rapsey wins WA Screen Award for Outstanding Contribution to Industry
- 2010: Graduate Mike Hoath wins WA Young Filmmaker of the Year
- 2010: Graduate Magda Wozniak wins WA Screen Award for Best Screenplay
- 2009: The short The Bucks' Party and the documentary The Bubbleologist selected for the Bondi Short Film Festival
- 2008: Graduate Sam Barrett directs feature film No Through Road
- 2008: Graduate Paul Komadina directs feature film Director's Cut
- 2007: The short Postcard Vernosti receives Honours at California's ActionCut Festival
- 2007: The short Postcard Vernosti receives Merit Award at Australian Shorts Festival

== See also ==
- Film schools in Australia
