= Livia Bloom =

American film curator

- Occupation: Curator

Livia Bloom Ingram (née Livia Bloom) is an American cinema curator. Her writing and interviews regularly appear in the film journals Cinema Scope; Filmmaker, and Film Comment. She is the editor of the book Errol Morris: Interviews. Bloom currently serves as the Vice President for Icarus Films.

Ingram has curated film programs for the Museum of the Moving Image; The Maysles Cinema in Harlem, The French Embassy's Tournées Festival; The Nantucket Film Festival; the MPAA Student Academy Awards; and The Film Society of Lincoln Center, among other organizations.
