= Eilhard =

Eilhard is a masculine German given name. Notable people with the name include:

- Eilhard Lubinus (1565–1621), German Lutheran theologian and philosopher
- Eilhard Mitscherlich (1794–1863), German chemist
- Eilhard Wiedemann (1852–1928), German physicist and historian of science
