= Eilert =

Eilert is a male given name. Notable people with the given name include:

- Edvard Eilert Christie (1773–1831), Norwegian businessperson and politician
- Eilert Bøhm (1900–1982), Norwegian gymnast who competed in the 1920 Summer Olympics
- Eilert Dahl (1919–2004), Norwegian Nordic skier who competed in the late 1940s and early 1950s
- Eilert Ekwall (born 1877), Professor of English at Lund University, Sweden, from 1909 to 1942
- Eilert Falch-Lund (1875–1960), Norwegian sailor who competed in the 1908 and 1912 Summer Olympics
- Eilert Määttä (born 1935), retired Swedish professional ice hockey player and coach
- Eilert Pilarm (born 1953), Swedish Elvis impersonator
- Eilert Stang Lund (born 1939), Norwegian judge
- Eilert Sundt (1817–1875), Norwegian sociologist, known for his work on mortality, marriage and working class subjects
