= Eileen Ehlers =

American politician

Member of the New Hampshire House of Representatives
- In office 2006–2008
- Constituency: Merrimack 9

Personal details
- Party: Democratic

Eileen Spratt Ehlers is an American politician from New Hampshire. She served in the New Hampshire House of Representatives.

Ehlers endorsed the Bernie Sanders 2020 presidential campaign.
