= Deb Verhoeven =

Australian academic, writer, broadcaster, film critic and commentator

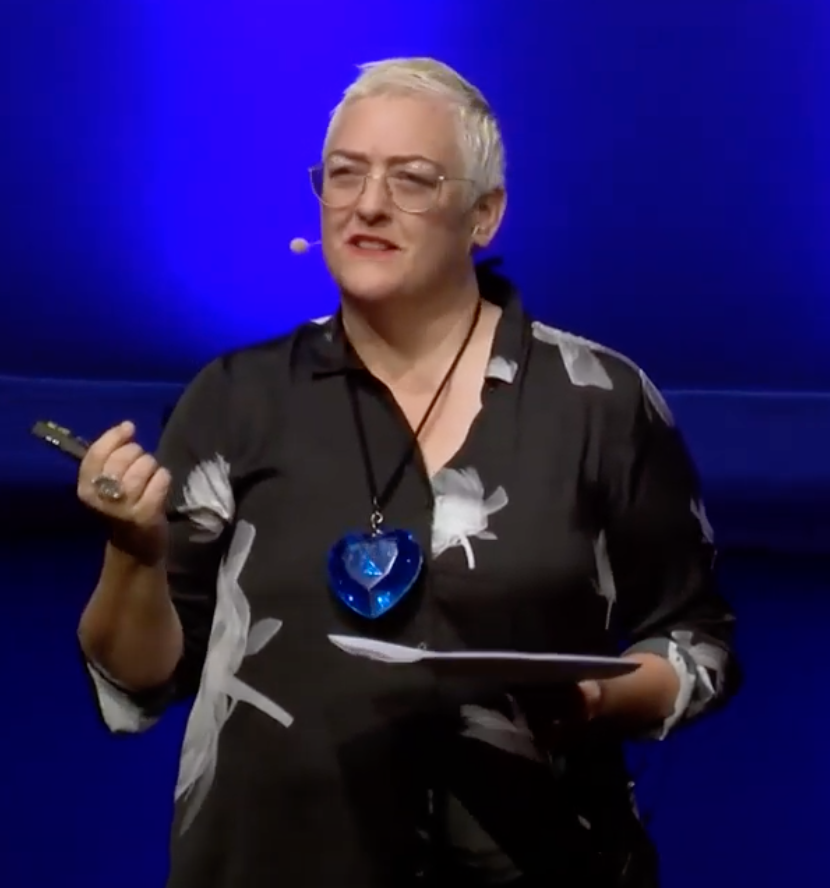
Deb Verhoeven presenting her keynote at the National Digital Forum conference 2019

Deb Verhoeven is currently the Canada 150 Research Chair in Gender and Cultural Informatics at the University of Alberta. Previously, she was Associate Dean of Engagement and Innovation at the University of Technology Sydney. Before this she was Professor of Media and Communication at Deakin University. Until 2011 she held the role of director of the AFI Research Collection at RMIT. A writer, broadcaster, film critic and commentator, Verhoeven is the author of over 100 journal articles and book chapters. Her book Jane Campion published by Routledge, is a detailed case study of the commercial and cultural role of the auteur in the contemporary world.

In 2008 Verhoeven was appointed inaugural deputy chair, National Film and Sound Archive (Aust.). She is the Director of the Humanities Networked Infrastructure project, a public virtual laboratory that combines data from may Australian cultural and research collections.

Verhoeven’s principal research interest lies in extending the limits of conventional film studies; exploring the intersection between cinema studies and other disciplines such as history, information management, geo-spatial science, statistics, urban studies and economics.In addition to scholarly publications and media appearances, she has focused on the development of online research resources such as the Cinema and Audiences Research Project (CAARP) database, an ongoing exploration of big cultural data (kinomatics) and The Ultimate Gig Guide (TUGG) an online archive of live music information.

She was the inaugural director of the Humanities Networked Infrastructure (HuNI) project, a national linked data initiative intended to unite and unlock Australia's cultural datasets. The project is funded by NeCTAR (National eResearch Collaboration Tools and Resources). HuNI is a national Virtual Laboratory project developed as part of the Australian government’s NeCTAR (National e-Research Collaboration Tools and Resources) program. HuNI combines information from 31 of Australia’s most significant cultural datasets. These datasets comprise more than a million authoritative records relating to the people, organisations, objects and events that make up Australia's abundant cultural heritage. HuNI also enables researchers to work with and share this large-scale aggregation of cultural information. HuNI was developed as a partnership between 13 public institutions, led by Deakin University. It is now operated by UTS.

A former CEO of the Australian Film Institute, Verhoeven is a member of the Australian Film Critics Association, the Fédération Internationale de la Presse Cinématographique (FIPRESCI), an honorary life member of Women in Film and Television, an executive member of the International Cinema Audiences Research Group (ICARG), and a founding member of the Screen Economics Research Group (SERG). As a film critic Verhoeven is a regular critical contributor to various programs on ABC Radio National and appeared fortnightly on the high rating Jon Faine program on ABC Local Radio for seven years. She was film critic for The Melbourne Times for six years and ran film programs on various public radio stations around Melbourne for many years prior to this.

Verhoeven has an active role in film publishing. Until 2012, she was chair of the film journal Senses of Cinema and was editor of the journal Studies in Australasian Cinema (Intellect) in 2009/10.

== Awards and fellowships ==
- 2014 Winner (HuNI), Council of Humanities, Arts and Social Sciences (CHASS) Audience Award
- 2010 Winner (bonza), Australian Teachers of Media (ATOM) Awards
- 2009/2010 Honorary Creative Fellowship, State Library of Victoria
- 2007 Visiting Professor, Som e Imagem, Escola das Artes, Universidade Católica Portuguesa, Porto
- 2006 Media Star Award (Most Media Appearances), RMIT University
- 2006 Highly Commended Finalist (Sheep and the Australian Cinema), Film and History Research and Writing Awards
- 2006 Best Australian Cinema Book 2006–7 (Sheep and the Australian Cinema), Australian Film Critic’s Association

== Selected publications ==
- Jane Campion, Routledge: London & New York, 2009
- Sheep and the Australian Cinema, Melbourne University Press: Melbourne, 2006
- Twin Peeks: Australian and New Zealand Feature Films, Damned Publishing: Melbourne, 1999

== Selected media ==
- 2014 HuNI: Helping Researchers Get Lucky, Video
- 2014 Big Data at the Movies, The Conversation
- 2014 Only at the Movies: Home Truths About Cinema Ticket Pricing, The Conversation
- 2013 Short on Grant Money? Five Tips for Crowdfunding Success (Most Media Appearances), The Conversation
- 2016 Women Aren't the Problem in the Film Industry, Men Are, The Conversation
