= Robbery Under Arms (disambiguation) =

Robbery Under Arms is an 1882-1883 novel by Rolf Boldrewood, writing as Thomas Alexander Browne.

Robbery Under Arms may also refer to several adaptations of the novel:

- Robbery Under Arms (1907 MacMahon film), an Australian film directed by Charles MacMahon
- Robbery Under Arms (1907 Tait film), an Australian lost film by J and N Tait and Millard Johnson and W Gibson
- Robbery Under Arms (1920 film), an Australian film directed by Kenneth Brampton
- Robbery Under Arms (1957 film), a British film directed by Jack Lee
- Robbery Under Arms (1985 film), an Australian film directed by Donald Crombie and Ken Hannam
- Robbery Under Arms (play), an 1890 play by Alfred Dampier and Garnet Walch
- Robbery Under Arms (radio adaptation), a 1950 British programme

== See also ==
- Robbery (disambiguation)
