= Wilful Murder =

Wilful Murder may refer to:

- Wilful murder
- Wilful Murder (play), an 1892 Australian play by Alfred Dampier and Garnet Walch
- Wilful Murder (short story), a short story by E. W. Hornung
