= Harry Readford =

Australian bushranger

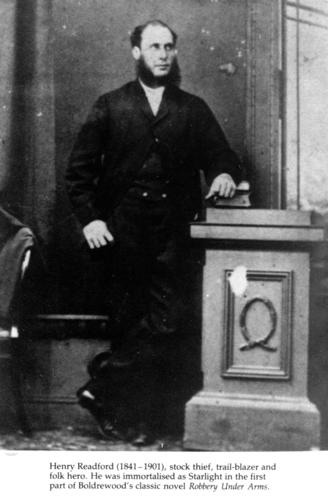
- Born: Henry Arthur Readford; December 1841; Mudgee, New South Wales, Australia
- Died: March 12, 1901 (aged 59); Northern Territory, Australia
- Spouse: Elizabeth Jane Scuthorpe (m.1871)
- Children: 1

Henry Arthur Readford (sometimes spelt Redford) (December 1841 – 12 March 1901), was an Australian stockman, drover and cattle thief.

Although Readford himself never used, and had never been associated with the moniker, Rolf Boldrewood indicated that the 'Captain Starlight' character, in his 1882–83 novel Robbery Under Arms, was a composite of several infamous people of the era, including Readford and several bushrangers. Readford's 1870 cattle drive was a major story arc in the book.

== Early life ==
Henry Arthur Redford was born in December 1841 near Mudgee in the Cudgegong District of New South Wales to a respectable family. Little is known of his early life. He originally operated locally, but later moved to Queensland where there were more opportunities for duffing.

== Bowen Downs Station ==
In 1870, Redford was working as a stockman on Bowen Downs Station near Longreach in Queensland. Realising that remote parts of the property, which stretched some 228 km (142 mi) along the Thomson River, were seldom visited by station workers, he devised a plan to steal some of the station's cattle. With two associates, George Dewdney and William Rooke, he built stockyards in an outlying part of the property, and gradually assembled a mob of about 1,000 cattle, which he then took from the property, all without any of the station workers realizing what was going on.

Redford knew the cattle would be recognised from their brands as being stolen if he tried to sell them in Queensland, so he headed for South Australia through the Channel Country and the Strzelecki Desert. Only ten years earlier, explorers Burke and Wills had set out to cross the continent along the same track, and died in the attempt. As a droving exercise, it was a remarkable achievement, as anyone who has travelled the present-day Strzelecki Track will know. Three months and 1,287 km (800 mi) later he exchanged two cows and a white bull for rations at Artracoona Native Well near Wallelderdine Station. They then moved the remainder of the mob via Mt Hopeless, and sold them for £5,000 (2009:A$250,000) at Blanchewater Station, east of Marree.

Workers at Bowen Downs eventually discovered the yards, and the tracks heading south. A party of stockmen and Aboriginal trackers set out on the trail, many weeks behind Readford. They eventually reached Artracoona where they recognised the white bull.

In April 1871 Redford married Elizabeth Jane Scuthorpe at Mrs Elizabeth Nevell's home in Lewis Street, Mudgee, NSW. The couple had at least one child, a daughter, Jemima Mary Elizabeth, in 1872. Readford was apprehended in Sydney in 1872, and faced trial in Roma, Queensland. However, the jury members were so impressed by his achievements that they found him not guilty, whereupon the judge, Charles Blakeney, remarked, "Thank God, gentlemen, that verdict is yours and not mine!" In response to the verdict, in July 1873, the Government shut down the Roma District Criminal Court for two years but rescinded the order in January 1874.

In 1881, several counts of horse stealing resulted in Readford being jailed for eighteen months in Brisbane. After his release, he drove cattle from the Atherton Tableland to Dubbo. In 1883, on behalf of Macdonald, Smith and Company, Readford drove 3,000 cattle which were the first mob taken to Brunette Downs near Corella Creek on the Barkly Tableland in the Northern Territory where he was the station manager. In 1899 he became the manager of McArthur River Station.

== Later life ==
In 1901 Redford set off from Brunette Downs to explore Central Australia, but (in what one author would later describe as "one of the great ironies of the outback"), the man who had guided so many travelers to safety drowned on 12 March of that year, died while trying to swim across Corella Creek, which had flooded due to heavy rain.

== An inspiration for Captain Starlight ==
Readford became something of a national hero, and the character Captain Starlight in Rolf Boldrewood's book Robbery Under Arms was based in part on his exploits.

Readford was never himself known by the name of Captain Starlight, which was the pseudonym of the bushranger Frank Pearson. Pearson had adopted the name Captain Starlight in 1868, twenty one years prior to the publication of the novel in 1889, but Boldrewood himself claimed that the Captain Starlight character in his novel was a composite of several bushrangers of the era. These did include Henry Readford, but another key inspiration was Thomas Law, the bushranger better known as Captain Midnight. In particular, the early chapters of Robbery Under Arms recall Readford's exploits, while the denouement follows the shoot-out and death of Midnight.

An annual Harry Redford Cattle Drive commemorates Readford's exploits as a drover. A range of riders from the city and country participate in this droving expedition, taking part for three days or up to three weeks, at their choice.

The story also inspired the 1987 feature film Bullseye.
