= Roma Courthouse =

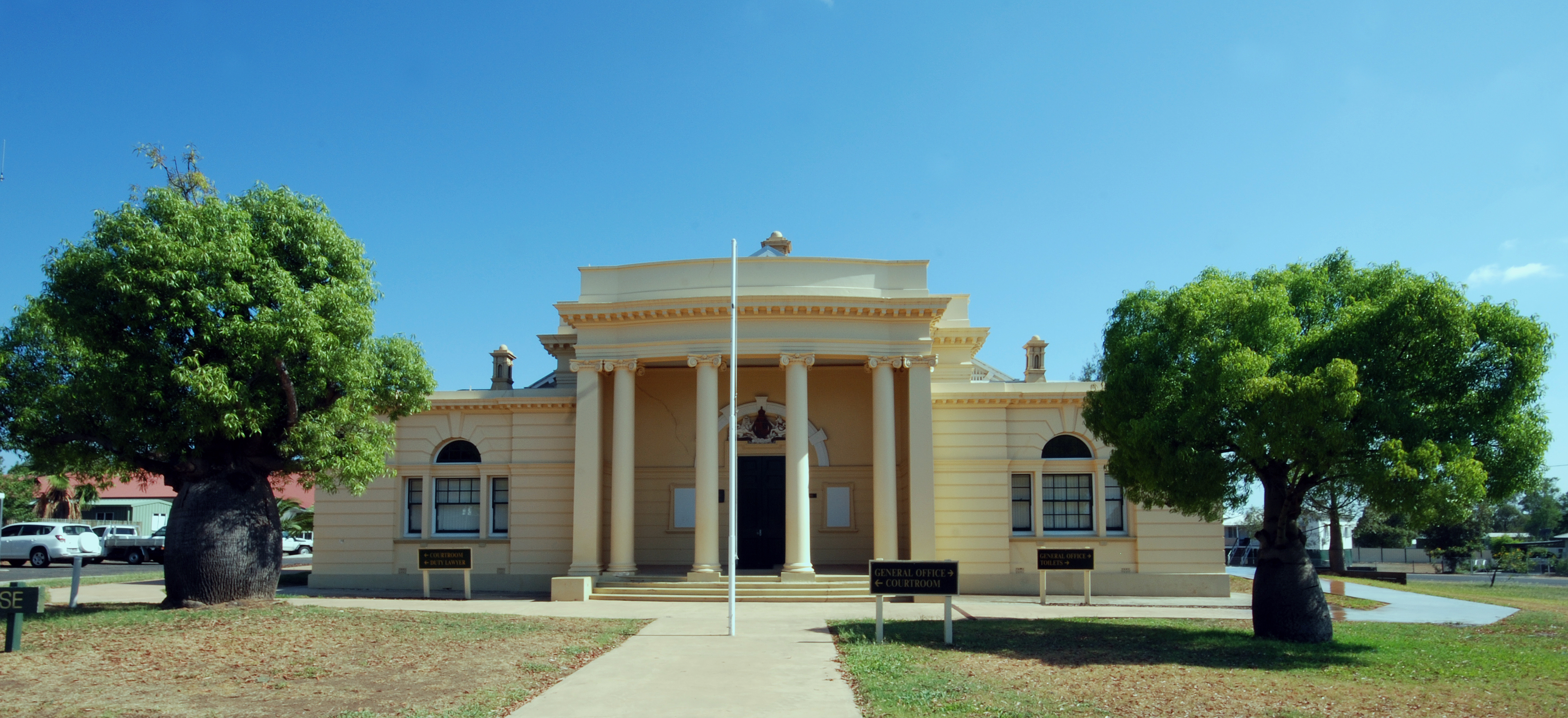
- Roma Courthouse, 2009

- Location within Queensland
- 26.5705°S 148.7845°E
- Location: 141 McDowall Street, Roma, Maranoa Region, Queensland, Australia

History
- Design period: 1900–1914 (early 20th century)
- Built: 1900–1919

Queensland Heritage Register
- Official name: Roma Court House and Police Buildings
- Type: state heritage (built, landscape)
- Designated: 7 August 1998
- Reference no.: 601285
- Significant period: 1900s–1920s (historical); 1900s–1930s (fabric incl bottle trees); 1900–ongoing (social)
- Significant components: roof/ridge ventilator/s, fleche/s, trees of social, historic or special significance, cell block, police station, court house

Roma Courthouse is a heritage-listed courthouse at 141 McDowall Street, Roma, Maranoa Region, Queensland, Australia. Constructed in 1901, the courthouse is a rendered masonry building, which is still in use today. Predominately influenced by the Federation free style, it is considered a stunning example of Federation colonial architecture at its best. It is also known as Roma Court House and Roma Police Buildings. It was added to the Queensland Heritage Register on 7 August 1998.

== History ==
The Roma Courthouse is a rendered masonry building located on a triangular block facing McDowall Street. It was constructed between 1900 and 1901 and was designed by architect John Smith Murdoch, the Second Assistant Architect of the Queensland Works Department. The Police Buildings were completed in 1919 as the Roma police station, barracks, offices and cell block, servicing the Roma district. The Roma Police Buildings are simple single-storeyed timber buildings adjacent to the Roma Courthouse, also facing McDowall street.

Roma was the principal town of the Mount Abundance district, which was established as a pastoral and agricultural region after exploration by Thomas Mitchell, New South Wales Surveyor General in 1846. It was originally settled by squatters, who established it as primarily a sheep grazing area. The township of Roma was proclaimed in September 1862, the first town formed in Queensland after separation in 1859. Roma was named after Lady Bowen, wife of the first Governor of Queensland, Sir George Ferguson Bowen. She was the daughter of a Governor of the Ionian Islands and her maiden name was Countess Diamantina Georgina di Roma. Surveyor McDowall laid out the town reserving a section for public buildings bounded by Bungil, Charles, McDowall and Gregory streets. The first land sales were held in September 1863. The town of Roma was declared a municipality, the Borough of Roma, in 1867. The growth in Roma's economy and population was matched by similar development in the administration of law and order in the town.

Over 145 courthouses were constructed in Queensland between separation in 1859 and 1900. There was considerable variation in the types and size of structures, ranging from the slab construction in Cunnamulla in 1869 to the masonry of the Supreme Court in Rockhampton in 1887. In the first course of construction, between 1860 and 1874, the government established 40 courthouses in the initial establishment phase of townships. Between 1875 and 1890 the growth in Queensland's economy and population continued and the corresponding construction of courthouses proceeded in newly formed townships. The marked difference in this second phase in development was the significant improvement in the quality of the built form. This period also saw the replacement of the temporary constructions of the earlier period. The 1890s saw a decrease in the building of courthouses; an average of two buildings per year were completed in the ten years to federation. Roma Courthouse is one of only ten surviving masonry courthouses built in Queensland in the 19th century.

=== Roma Courthouse ===
In 1865, a reserve for court and police purposes was selected in Roma, on the hill west of the town centre. This reserve was bounded by McDowall, May (now Soutter), Queen and Albert Streets. The latter street once connected Albert and Spencer Streets. It was on this site that the first Roma courthouse was completed in 1866. From 1863 local magistrates had conducted court hearings in rented premises. The first courthouse faced Albert Street, and was a small timber building, extended in 1884 to accommodate sittings of the Supreme Court in circuit. The location of the courthouse influenced the town's continued development, resulting in the area becoming known as the West End.

This first courthouse was the site of the first meeting of the Roma Town Council on 10 August 1867. A simple concrete monument mounted with a granite tablet and plaque, commemorating this event, is located at the front of the Police Station in McDowall Street. It was erected during centenary celebrations in 1967 and was unveiled by Gwydir Laycock, former chairman of the Bungil Shire Council.

Roma flourished with the advent of the railway in the 1880s, ensuring the efficient transportation of stock and produce to the coastal ports. The Great Artesian Basin was tapped in Queensland in the late 1880s and early 1890s, securing an alternate water supply for cattle and sheep. Consistent with the growth of the Maronoa district was the increasing demand for justice administration. During this period cases heard in the various courts held at Roma increased from approximately 210 in 1892 to 280 in 1898.

The trial in 1872 of Harry Redford (also known as Captain Starlight) was held in the Roma Courthouse. Redford was accused of stealing 1,000 head of cattle from Bowen Downs Station near Longreach in Queensland and driving them to South Australia. Explorers Burke and Wills had died attempting to cross the same terrain nine years earlier. He was tried and acquitted in February 1873.

Roma's 1866 courthouse was replaced in 1901 with a new building erected a little to the east, on a new reserve for court purposes gazetted in 1900. The courthouse reserve was created by combining a market reserve, at the corner of McDowall and Queen Streets, with part of the Albert Street road reserve which had been incorporated with the police reserve in 1883.

The Roma Courthouse was designed by John Smith Murdoch who at the time was the Second Assistant Architect, responsible for the designing and drafting staff, of the Queensland Department of Public Works. Murdoch arrived in Australia from Scotland, originally working in Melbourne. He began working for the Queensland Department of Public Works in the mid-1880s, leaving temporarily to practice privately with John Hall and Sons, before returning in the mid-1890s. Murdoch later went on to become the first Australian Government Architect in 1919.

The original 1899 design for the new courthouse was to be of timber, based on a H-shaped design. However, the township of Roma demanded a courthouse that reflected the Western Districts' growth in population, economic importance and political power. The community thought a grand architectural gesture more appropriate than the planned building. The plans were altered to accommodate brick, thought to be more substantial and lasting. The laying of the foundation stone was performed in a ceremony by the Mayor of Roma, Alderman John McEwan Hunter on 4 September 1900. The building was completed in December 1901 for a cost of £5964.

The new courthouse was built alongside the old, allowing the legal and police activities to continue during construction. After the 1866 building was vacated by the court in 1902, it was converted to constables quarters and was finally removed from the site in 1931.

The major consideration in the design and planning of the 1900–1901 courthouse was the allowance for the correct movement of people in the building and the separation of the different groups involved in the judicial process. The verandahs and arcades allowed for specific delineated entrances to the buildings. Jurors and barristers entered the courthouse by an alternative route to the public on their way to the public spaces. Judges and the Attorney-General had a private entrance and lobby via the rear verandah. The Police Magistrate and barristers could also access their rooms from this verandah. The prisoners would be brought directly from the police cells to the court room through the side arcade door. The separate female and male witness rooms, were located at the front of the courthouse to avoid hearing previous evidence before making their testimony.

With consideration for the harsh western climate a detailed and technical ventilation system was constructed in the Roma Courthouse. Conventional cast iron wall ventilators were combined with Tobin's Tubes to carry cool air from beneath the building into the court room. Boyles roof ventilation using an air pump ventilator, connected by an iron shaft to a bell mouth over a ceiling ventilator, extracted the hot air from the building. Fireplaces were incorporated to provide heating in the winter.

In May 1931 trees were planted to beautify the Roma Courthouse grounds as part of the Unemployment Relief Scheme. In January 1934 five bottle trees, Kurrajong and other indigenous trees were added to the grounds. The bottle trees at the front of the building replaced the original picket fence and match the trees planted as part of Heroes Avenue to serve as a memorial to the Roma residents who enlisted in the First World War. It is not clear whether these trees were planted to serve a commemorative function.

The interior of the court room was extensively altered in the 1960s with the addition of a false ceiling and updating of the fixtures and the furniture. The new ceiling effectively blocked the clerestory windows and covered the domed roof, altering the patterns of light and ventilation. It is probable that the original masonry parapets on the rear of the buildings were removed during the recladding of the roof during these alterations. In 1973, alterations to the main court room to accommodate the clerk of court in the front section of the building, including the former witness rooms, was carried out. Air conditioning was added in 1978.

=== Roma Police Buildings ===
The Police Buildings, which are single-storeyed timber structures, were erected in 1919. They comprise offices and barracks, addressing McDowall Street, and a cell block at the rear of the Police Reserve.

A lock up was the first purpose-built police building in Roma, completed during the construction of the first courthouse in 1866. In 1868, a gaol servicing the wider region, was located on a separate reserve at the corner of Souter and McDowall Streets, adjacent to the courthouse and lock up. The gaol was closed in 1923 and the site is now occupied by three police residences.

The first Roma police station was built in 1885 and was located to the north of the 1866 courthouse, facing Albert Street. The building provided both accommodation for police and office space for official duties. Prior to the completion of the station, police were accommodated in timber huts, private lodgings or a choice of Roma's many public establishments. The 1885 police station was replaced in 1919 with a new police station and barracks facing McDowall street, on the site of the 1866 courthouse. At this time, the first police station was converted to Senior Sergeants quarters and removed or demolished in 1957.

The 1919 Police Station was designed by the office of the Queensland Government Architect. It was a modified E-shape, that incorporated climatic design considerations and classical architecture features. A single-storeyed structure, the design separates the official police duties from the residential accommodation. A covered way and garden acts to both link and separate the two buildings and their relative functions. The police barracks are housed in the western building with the offices of the senior sergeant and the sub inspector housed in the eastern building. The design of the barracks indicates the improvement of living conditions for members of the force in comparison with the rudimentary conditions of the late 19th century and early 20th century. It incorporates dormitory, a billiard room, kitchen and cook's room and a generous dining area on the rear verandah. The use of latticework on the rear verandah ventilated the dining space. The preference for single men as constables is indicated by the dormitory style quarters.

During 1962 there were major additions, alterations and spatial reconfiguration of the Police Buildings. New concrete stumps and weatherboards were installed and a new store was added to the western back corner of the McDowall Street building. The conversion of the police barracks to act only as a police station occurred at this time, the new arrangement of the spaces in the building was associated with this change. New toilets were installed in 1970; a covered work bay was added in 1978; and a tea room in 1979.

A cell block consisting of four cells, each 12 by 8 feet (3.7 by 2.4 m) facing a verandah, was constructed at the same time as the 1919 police station. This building was used for remand of prisoners before trial or awaiting transfer to larger correctional facilities. In 1962, two new cells were added to the building, providing an extra female cell and a female toilet. In the western section of the building, two cells were converted to a charge room and records room; and a male toilet. In 1998 this building was repositioned on the police reserve to accommodate the construction of a new watch house.

== Description ==
=== Roma Courthouse ===
Roma Courthouse is located on a triangular block bounded by McDowall and Queen Streets and the Police Reserve. The building faces south toward McDowall Street and is aligned to this street. It is a single- storeyed rendered masonry building designed in a style that is influenced by Federation Free Style. Together with the adjoining police buildings, it forms a precinct of justice administration.

The H-shaped plan incorporates the entrance facade, the court room which dominates the form of the building and rear wings. The symmetrical form of the entrance facade incorporates a prominent central curved vestibule, with four approach steps. The vestibule has four columns, two pilasters and entablature of the Ionic order. The main entrance is double doors with 4 panels and is crowned by a Queensland coat of arms. Ornate notice boards are located either side of the door. The vestibule is flanked on the east and west sides by rooms featuring double hung windows, with semi-circular fanlights, facing McDowall street. The entablature is continued around the front facade of the building. The entablature, string courses and window heads are cement rendered with a ruled render surface continued throughout externally.

Three clerestory windows are situated above the arcades either side of the building. Each window has five panes and a timber louvred panel. Three air conditioning units are located on the western arcade roof. Paired narrow double-hung windows face south from the wings. The rear verandah is partially enclosed with fibro cladding and louvred and aluminium frame windows. The verandah provides access to the office spaces.

Arcades provide additional entrance points to the court room, the front rooms and the symmetrical east and west wings. The east side wing comprises a lobby area, jury room and crown solicitors office. The west side wing comprises a lobby area, and the offices of the court of petty sessions and the police magistrate. Behind the court room, the Judges chamber and the office of the Attorney General are located. No room is larger than the central courtroom. The 1973 remodelling of the court room space created a clerk of the court public office that occupies the front section of the building. The main court room has a suspended ceiling and all original furniture has been replaced. The interior retains original decorative architraves, and other original details such as joinery and fireplaces are evident in some areas.

The rolled galvanised iron roof has five tall chimneys and seven roof ventilators of varied size. The court room roof is raised above both the roof of the rear and front sections. The separate flat arcade roofing at the half elevation maintains access for light and ventilation through the clerestory windows. The roof is a gable hipped, with ventilator louvres in the gablets and corresponding smaller gablets cap the east and west wings. A small forward projecting gablet proclaims the arched entrance to the rear verandah.

A masonry toilet block is located at the rear of the building. Five bottle trees (Brachychiton rupestris), Kurrajong (Brachychiton populensis) and other indigenous trees are located in the courthouse grounds. A simple flagpole is centrally located in front of the main entrance to the building.

=== Police Buildings ===
The Police Buildings are located in the Police Reserve on McDowall street adjacent to the west of the Roma Courthouse. The Police Buildings comprise a timber police station and a timber cell block/lock up. The police station is a combination of two separate single-storeyed timber buildings with corrugated iron roofing, connected by a covered way. The Police Station faces south and is aligned to McDowall Street. The cell block is located at the rear of the Police Station and the 1998 watch house.

A modified E-shape plan incorporates two buildings connected by a covered way. The western building is weatherboard clad with a hipped corrugated iron roof. A verandah runs the breadth of the building and has been enclosed at each end creating two rooms which are entered from the verandah. The verandah has paired verandah posts and timber rail balustrade. Four timber approach steps are off centre and directly access the main entrance door to the police station. A faceted bay window protrudes onto the verandah space. An eyelid dormer window with four small fixed casements is located above the bay window. A decorative fleche is centred on the roof ridge, aligned with the dormer and bay windows.

The eastern, smaller building, is asymmetrical. Seven timber approach steps, with a simple iron balustrade led to a forward projecting gabled porch. Paired aluminium doors provide entrance to the screened verandah. The front verandah has paired verandah posts rising from weatherboard piers. The main pyramidal roof is extended over the verandah. A decorative fleche matching the western building is centrally located on the roof.

Casement windows with simple timber supported hoods are located on the western and eastern faces of both buildings. The covered way has five timber approach steps, entered via the garden area between the two buildings. This entrance provides access to the rear of both buildings.

The cell block/lock up is a simple weatherboard clad building with corrugated iron roof. A verandah is located along the south eastern face of the building with paired verandah posts that match those of the police station. The building is raised on timber stumps and is entered via four timber steps located at the south western end of the building. Three sets of louvres are located in the front verandah enclosure. Four south-western and 6 north-western facing hopper windows indicate the internal office space at the south western end of the building. Six small high set windows, with iron bars, are located on the eastern face of the building indicating the former cells.

Located at the former gate entrance of the Police buildings, is a simple concrete monument mounted with a granite tablet and plaque. It reads "This plaque commemorates the first meeting of the Roma Town Council, 10 August 1867, Thomas McEwan, Mayor".

== Heritage listing ==
Roma Courthouse and Police Buildings was listed on the Queensland Heritage Register on 7 August 1998 having satisfied the following criteria.

The place is important in demonstrating the evolution or pattern of Queensland's history.

The Roma Courthouse was constructed in 1900–1901 and the Police Buildings in 1919. The Roma Courthouse and Police Buildings reflect the development of Roma, a pastoral service town, and the establishment of government administration for the prosperous surrounding district, in the late 19th and early 20th centuries. The large masonry form of the Roma Courthuse is indicative of the relevant importance of Roma in relation to other towns in western Queensland. The Police Buildings reflect the multi-functional use of the police reserve to accommodate residences, official duties and remand facilities.

The place is important in demonstrating the principal characteristics of a particular class of cultural places.

The Roma Courthouse and Police Buildings are good examples of Queensland Public Works courthouse and police buildings design in the late 19th and early 20th centuries.

The place is important because of its aesthetic significance.

The Roma Courthouse and Police Buildings are of considerable aesthetic significance due to their landmark qualities and for their high degree of design and workmanship.

The place has a strong or special association with a particular community or cultural group for social, cultural or spiritual reasons.

The site of Roma Courthouse and Police Buildings is significant for a long association with law and order and the dispensing of justice in Roma since 1866. The Roma Courthouse and Police Buildings are an important community focus in the township of Roma, connecting the local and district community to governance in the Maronoa District of south western Queensland. The monument commemorating the first town council is evidence of the importance of this site to the community.

The place has a special association with the life or work of a particular person, group or organisation of importance in Queensland's history.

Roma Courthouse has a strong association with important architect John Smith Murdoch, as an example of the development of his work.
