= The Scout (play) =

1891 play by Alfred Dampier and Garnet Walcht

- Original language: English
- Written by: Alfred Dampier; Garnet Walch
- Genre: Melodrama; Wild West
- Setting: The American West

Premiere
- Date: 9 May 1891
- Place: Alexandra Theatre, Melbourne

The Scout is a melodrama by Alfred Dampier and Garnet Walch set in the American west.

The play came about in part because of the success Dampier had with his production of The Miner's Right. He decided to construct a play where he would feature W.F. Carver and his Wild America Troupe into a dramatic story. Carver would play himself and the production would feature a huge water tank, 12 x 3 metres, featuring real ducks, Indians padding canoes and stunts involving horses.

The original production starred Lily Dampier, Alfred Dampier's daughter, alongside Carver, and was a considerable success.

Dampier later reworked the play as The Trapper for Carver and Lily. Carver later performed The Scout in the USA, although it was not advertised as an Australian play. The play was also revived in 1895 as The Prairie King (with sole writing credit being given to Walch).
