= Highway Robbery =

Highway Robbery may refer to:

- Highway robbery
- "Highway Robbery" (song), a 1988 song by Tanya Tucker
- Highway Robbery (Guilty Simpson and Small Professor album), a 2013 album by Guilty Simpson and Small Professor
- Highway Robbery (Freeway and The Jacka album), a 2014 album by rappers The Jacka and Freeway
- "Highway Robbery", a song by The Dillinger Escape Plan on their album Miss Machine

== See also ==
- Robbery (disambiguation)
