= Midnight (bushranger) =

Thomas Law (c. 1850 – 21 September 1878), known by the alias Midnight, was an Australian bushranger active in New South Wales and Queensland. He served as the inspiration for Captain Starlight, the main character in Rolf Boldrewood's 1882 bushranging novel Robbery Under Arms.

== Life ==
Little is known about Law's early life, and uncertainty remains as to whether Thomas Law was his real name. He was 20 years old when, in June 1870 in Bathurst, New South Wales, he was convicted of stealing cattle from the property of William Charles Wentworth and sentenced to five years imprisonment at Parramatta Gaol. He escaped prison two years later. Over the next several years, he went by various aliases as he evaded the police and moved about rural and outback districts of New South Wales and Queensland.

Going by the sobriquet Midnight, Law became a leading member of a notorious horse and cattle-stealing syndicate known as the Merri Merri gang, that operated on the New South Wales-Queensland border, particularly near the Macquarie River and Queensland's South West. Known for their fast riding and haunts in the outback, they also relied on a network of sympathisers. Police received tips that Midnight was Parramatta escapee Law, and started to close in on the bushranger. On 18 September 1878, Law and an accomplice were captured and arrested near Dubbo by Senior-constable Murphy, of Brewarrina, but after savagely beating him with a stirrup iron, Law managed to escape. Two days later, Law was tracked down in the Warren district and cornered by the police at a hotel. In the ensuing gunfight, Law fatally shot Senior-sergeant Thomas Wallings and fled the scene. The manhunt intensified, and Law made his way to Enngonia, where he engaged in another gunfight with the police. He tried escaping on horseback, but was shot in the left side and apprehended. When asked his real name, he replied, "My right name I will never tell; I have lived like a dog, and like a dog I die."

Law was taken to Wapweelah Station, where he died the following morning. He was buried close to the homestead.

== Legacy ==
When writing his 1882 bushranging novel Robbery Under Arms, Rolf Boldrewood drew inspiration from Law. Not long after Law's death, Boldrewood passed through Gulgong and made inquiries about the bushranger. He claimed in 1900 to know his real name, but said "no good purpose would be served by making it public". In 1904, he confirmed that the main character of Robbery Under Arms, Captain Starlight, while "chiefly imaginary", was inspired by "an undeveloped bushranger—part horse-thief—known as 'Midnight', in the Gulgong and Dubbo districts". Boldrewood scholars have noted that, apart from Midnight and Starlight's similar names, they both shared "a similar mode of death, remaining anonymous to the last".

== Bibliography ==
- Boldrewood, Rolf (2006). Eggert, Paul; Webby, Elizabeth (eds.). Robbery Under Arms. University of Queensland Press. ISBN 9780702235757.
