= Robbery Under Arms (1957 film) =

1957 bushranger film directed by Jack Lee

- British theatrical poster
- Directed by: Jack Lee
- Written by: Alexander Baron; W. P. Lipscomb; Richard Mason
- Based on: Robbery Under Arms (1888 novel) by Rolf Boldrewood
- Produced by: Joseph Janni
- Starring: Peter Finch; Ronald Lewis
- Cinematography: Harry Waxman
- Edited by: Manuel del Campo
- Music by: Mátyás Seiber
- Production company: The Rank Organisation
- Distributed by: J. Arthur Rank Film Distributors (UK)
- Release dates: 3 October 1957 (London); 4 December 1957 (Australia)
- Running time: 99 minutes
- Countries: United Kingdom; Australia
- Language: English

Robbery Under Arms is a 1957 bushranger film directed by Jack Lee and starring Peter Finch, Ronald Lewis, Maureen Swanson and David McCallum. It is adapted by Alexander Baron, W. P. Lipscomb and Richard Mason from the 1888 novel of the same name by Thomas Alexander Browne (under the pen name "Rolf Boldrewood").

Set in the bush and goldfields of Australia in the 1860s, the film follows members of the Marston family as they join the notorious bushranger gang of Captain Starlight. The novel, which is considered a classic of Australian colonial literature, had previously been adapted into a popular stage play and several silent films.

The film was produced by Joseph Janni for The Rank Organisation and filmed on-location in Flinders Ranges, South Australia and New South Wales. It premiered in London on October 3, 1957, and was released in Australia on December 4. It has been called "a pointless misfire".

== Plot ==
In 1865 Australia, the two Marston brothers, bold Dick and sensitive Jim, are drawn into a life of crime by their ex-convict father Ben and his friend, the famous cattle thief Captain Starlight. They help take some cattle their father and Starlight have stolen across the country to Adelaide, where they are sold, with Starlight impersonating an English gentleman claiming to own the rustled herd.

The two brothers take their share of the money and go to Melbourne. On board ship, they meet the Morrison sisters: greedy Kate and nice Jean, who are romanced by Dick and Jim respectively. They read that Starlight has been arrested, and return home, where they and their father narrowly escape arrest.

The brothers are then reunited with Starlight, who has left prison, and join him and some other men in robbing a coach, in which a trooper is shot and killed. Dick and Jim go to the gold fields to make enough money to escape to America. There, they are reunited with Kate, who is married but is still interested in Dick, and Jean, who Jim marries.

Just as the brothers are about to leave to start a new life, Captain Starlight and his gang (including Ben Marston) arrive to rob the local bank. During the robbery, several people are killed by Starlight's gang (although not by Starlight), including a mother protecting child. Jim Marston is captured by locals and is about to be lynched, but is rescued by a trooper who comes to arrest him. Dick rescues Jim from the trooper, but is killed in the attempt.

Jim hides out with Starlight and his father, but misses his wife too much and goes back to see her. Starlight and Ben Marston are killed in a shoot out with police. Jim Marston is arrested.

== Cast ==
- Peter Finch as Captain Starlight
- Ronald Lewis as Dick Marston
- Laurence Naismith as Ben Marston
- Maureen Swanson as Kate Morrison Mullockson
- David McCallum as Jim Marston
- Vincent Ball as George Storefield
- Jill Ireland as Jean Morrison
- Dudy Nimmo as Eileen Marston
- Jean Anderson as Ma Marston
- Ursula Finlay as Grace Storefield
- John Cadell as Warrigal, black rustler
- Larry Taylor as Burke, new rustler
- Russell Napier as Banker Green
- Max Wagner as Sergeant Goring
- Bartlett Mullins as Paddy
- Ewen Solon as Sergeant Arthur

== Ealing Studios Version ==
The novel had been adapted numerous times over the years for film, radio and stage. Ealing Studios, which was financed by the Rank Organisation, had planned to make a film version after The Overlanders (1946) and Eureka Stockade (1949), and they hired William Lipscomb to do the script. Gregory Peck at one stage was announced as a possible star.

In June 1949 Ealing announced Ralph Smart would direct the film after he finished work on Bitter Springs at an estimated budget of £250,000 with John McCallum as a possible star. These plans did not come to fruition.

Then Ken G. Hall, who had often announced plans to make a film version of the novel for Cinesound Productions in the 1930s, became attached to the project. He organised a co-production between Ealing and an Australian syndicate financed by Charles Munro, with Hall to direct. However plans to make the film were hampered by the financial failure of Eureka Stockade and Bitter Springs, the closing of Pagewood Studios and the issuance of a government regulation to cap the raising of finance. Leslie Norman was keen to produce.

In 1956 Ealing Studios ended its longstanding relationship with Rank and signed a contract with MGM. In February 1956 Michael Balcon, head of Ealing, announced the studio would make a film of Robbery Under Arms as well as another movie set in Australia, The Shiralee. However while Ealing wound up making The Shiralee with MGM, rights to Robbery Under Arms remained with Rank, who made it through its own company, Rank Organisation Film Productions.

== Rank Organisation ==
=== Development ===
Director Jack Lee and producer Joseph Janni had a big hit with the Australian-themed A Town Like Alice (1956), starring Peter Finch and written by Lipscomb. Rank put Lee and Janni under contract for two years and had Finch under contract. Jack Lee later said:

I wanted to work with Finch again and I was attracted to Australia... I made a mistake choosing Robbery Under Arms, a complicated Victorian novel with masses of plots and subplots and too much moralising. However I went ahead and chose the part for Peter Finch, who complained that he was overshadowed by everyone else, and in a way he was right. Janni and I weren't happy with the script and would have liked to put it off for another year. But we were under pressure from Rank and we had to go ahead with an inadequate script. There are one or two nice scenes in it but it's too slow and talky.

In May 1956 it was announced the Rank organisation would make Robbery Under Arms with Lee and Jannie with filming to begin in December. In June 1956 it was announced the lead role would be played by Peter Finch - who was just about to leave England to make The Shiralee in Australia for Ealing MGM

Filmink argued a factor in Rank agreeing to make the film was its "determination around that time to combat the threat of television by making more films overseas on location (eg Ferry to Hong Kong, Windom's Way, The Wind Cannot Read, Campbell's Kingdom, Across the Bridge, The Spanish Gardener, Seven Thunders)."

According to Vincent Ball, who had been in A Town Like Alice, Peter Finch suggested to Jack Lee that Ball and Finch play the Marsden boys but John Davis, the managing director of Rank, "insisted that contract artistes be used for the leads". Ball agreed to play a smaller role in the movie if he could go to Australia. He was away "ten or eleven weeks" on salary to say one line in Australia filming the rest of his scenes at Pinewood. The biggest part was given to second-billed Ronald Lewis as Dick Marston. It has been argued that Maureen Swanson had "probably the best part" as a flirtatious sister. Both were under contract to Rank, as were Finch, David McCallum and Jill Ireland.

In October 1956 Janni and Lee visited Australia to scout locations. Janni declared "Robbery Under Arms will be pretty much an old team picture" reuniting much of the cast and crew from A Town Like Alice. "It is to be a bigger picture than Alice in terms of expense and location work," he added. "We want to preserve Boldrewood's book intact although it is so vast and enormous we could easily find material for ten pictures."

According to Finch's biographer, Finch was unhappy with the script and refused to make the movie. Lee and Janni rewrote it but Finch was still dissatisfied. However John Davis of Rank insisted Finch make the film, as he was under contract. Finch later complained "off we all went at half cock with a half baked project rushed in and out of the oven because that was the chef's orders."

=== Shooting ===
Peter Finch arrived in Darwin on 30 January 1957, announcing that J. Arthur Rank would back a film for Finch to direct in Australia; Finch hoped for D'Arcy Niland to write the script (this project never happened.) Most of the key cast were imported from Britain, including expat Australians Russell Napier and Ball; although some were locally-hired, such as Ursula Finlay. It was the first film for Aboriginal actor and stockman Johnny Cadell (1920-93).

Shooting began in January 1957 on location in Australia at the Flinders Ranges, South Australia, including Port Augusta and Wilpena Pound, and near Bourke, New South Wales, with two days filming at Pagewood Studios.

According to Lee, Finch was difficult to work with while making the movie with the director calling him "moody, sullen, evasive and devious." However while in Adelaide director Jack Lee met Isabel Kidman, grand-daughter of famous pastoralist Sir Sidney Kidman; although both Lee and Kidman were married, they fell in love and got divorced to marry each other - Lee later settled permanently in Australia.

In April the unit moved to the UK where interiors and exteriors were shot at Pinewood studios in Buckinghamshire.

During the making of the film, on-screen couple David McCallum and Jill Ireland fell in love off screen as well, and married in May.

Lee said during the shoot he was making "an uninhibited movie. It isn't going to be a smart movie but a simple, good old-fashioned film." He wanted to have attractive women in the film, stating, "the trouble is, so many British film makers are frightened of putting sex on the screen," he said. "Or if they haven't been frightened they have retreated from it. I've done my share of retreating but I hate retreating. This is going to be my advance."

== Reception ==
The film had its world premiere in London on 3 October 1957, the week Pinewood Studios celebrated its 21st birthday. It had dual premieres in Australia on 4 December 1957 in Port Augusta and Bourke.

=== Box office ===
The movie was popular at the Australian box office, although reviews were poor. It did not make the list in Kinematograph Weekly of the most successful films at the British box office in 1957 (whereas The Shiralee did). Josh Billings of that magazine called the film's performance "a bit of a disappointment. I had high hope of this husky melodrama of life down-under, particularly as it starred Peter Finch, but there you are."

Filmink called the underwhelming reception to the movie "a real shame, especially as a more successful version of Robbery Under Arms might've encouraged Rank and Peter Finch to make more movies in Australia (Finch never came back here to work, even after the late '60s revival)."

=== Critical ===
The Guardian called it "a very good 'Western'" with "one weakness - a dispersal of dramatic interest among several characters." The Observer thought "the film's chief fault is that there isn't nearly enough of" Peter Finch.

Alexander Walker of The Birmingham Post called the film "messy... Were some of the key scenes lost on the way back? Were they left on the cutting room floor? Were they ever filmed at all?... The main charge I level against Robbery Under Arms is that no one has decided in advance on the state of the film."

The Monthly Film Bulletin wrote: "This film makes disappointing use of Rolf Boldrewood's picaresque novel; eventually, it just fails to command the attention. Technically it is precise, right from the neat, plain credit titles; but the narrative is slow, blunted, rambling. The characterisation is paste-board; the acting (excepting, occasionally, David McCallum) shaky; and the treatment is never clearly romantic nor, on the other hand, naturalistic. Nothing can reconcile the genuine Australian accents of the supporting players with the spurious drawls of the British artists."

Kinematograph Weekly declared it "contains all the thrills of the traditional Western yet has a distinct flavour of its own."

Variety called it:

A well-made, straightforward drama which should click okay in British houses. As is so often the case, its American impact will depend entirely on whether its stars are sufficient magnets to attract patrons outside the British domain. The picture is part of the Rank Organization's current policy of spotlighting the Commonwealth. Its main problem is whether it does not follow a bit too soon after "The Shiralee," which also starred Peter Finch and the wide, open Aussie spaces... The acting is less important than the situations. With fist- fights, gunfight and a near-lynching, there is plenty of* meat for good, solid thrills.

Filmink magazine called it "not a very good movie", due mostly to the script, but said "there are many things to admire about it, such as the photography, location work, and the sheer novelty of it being a big budget movie shot in 1950s Australia. It contains a genuinely sensational bank robbery sequence, and the final shoot-out has visual flair."

== See also ==
- Cinema of Australia
