= Jim Gerald =

Australian comedian

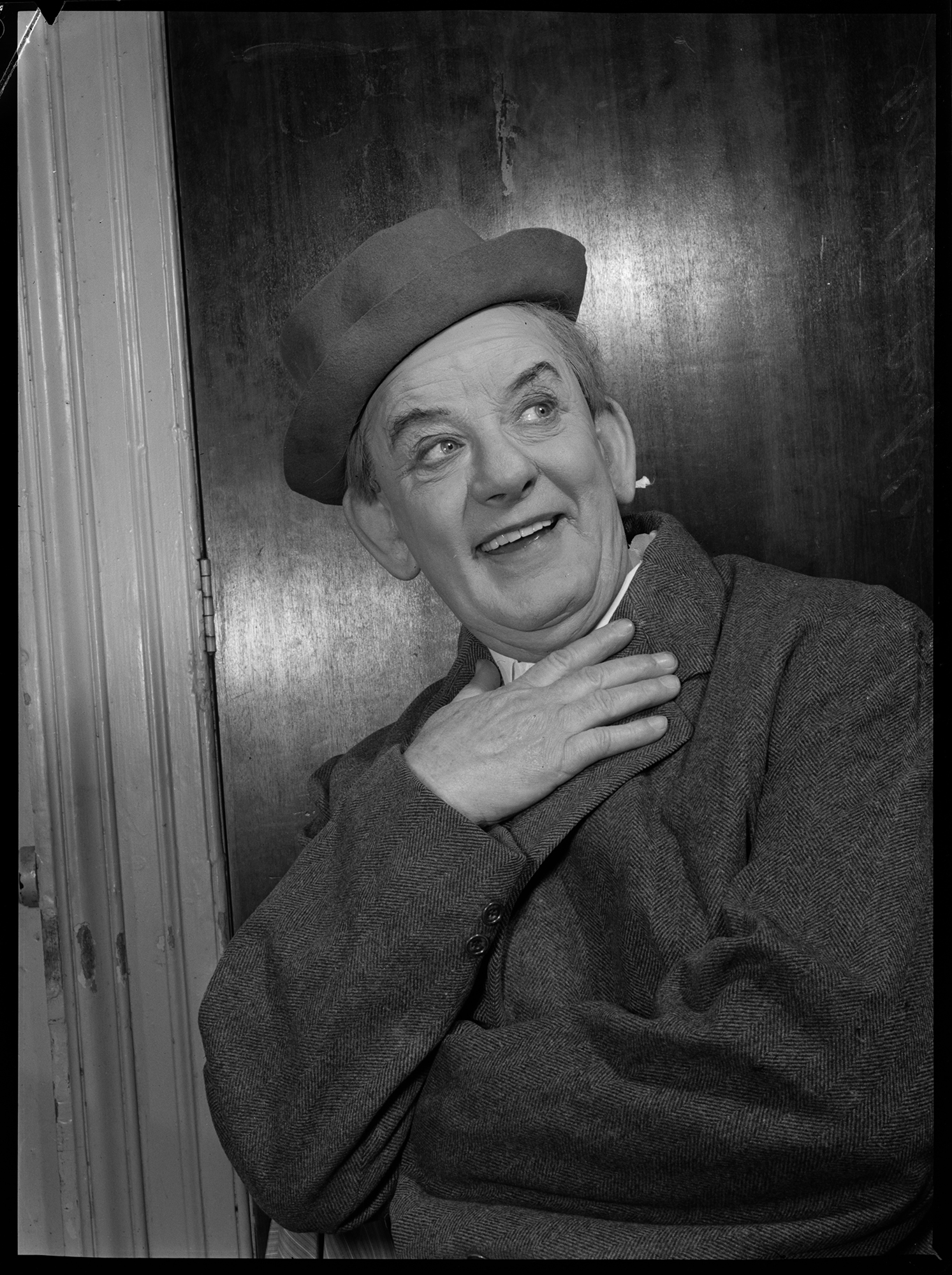
- Jim Gerald, Melbourne, 2 June 1951, by Gordon F. De Lisle.jpg
- Born: James Fitzgerald; 1 January 1891; Darlington, New South Wales
- Died: 2 March 1971 (aged 80); Melbourne, Victoria, Australia
- Occupations: Comedian; circus clown; acrobat; writer; director; trope leader; filmmaker; actor; radio producer
- Years active: 1907-1969
- Spouse: Esther Patience Futcher

Comedy career
- Medium: Theatrical, Circus, film
- Genres: Observational comedy, physical comedy, self-deprecation

Jim Gerald (1 January 1891 – 2 March 1971) born James Fitzgerald was an Australian comedian, circus clown, acrobat, writer, director and troupe leader and filmmaker. Theatre Historian Frank Van Straten has described Gerald as "the quintessential clown... [with] rubbery face... and the loose-limbed body of an acrobat." He is generally cited as one of the leading post-World War I comedians to work the Australasian variety circuits, the others being Nat Phillips, Roy Rene, and George Wallace.

== Biography ==
Born at Darlington, New South Wales, Gerald was the seventh son of Stephen Australia Fitzgerald, a tailor turned actor, and his wife Mary Ann, née Ingram. In his youth Gerald reportedly played truant from school to learn from acrobats practising on the sandhills behind Centennial Park. Three of his brothers also went on the stage using the names 'Max Clifton', 'Lance Vane' and 'Cliff Stevens'. In 1898 his father apprenticed him to Oscar Pagel, a strongman and acrobat. He subsequently toured South Africa, the Far East and North America with Pagel. Back in Australia by 1907, Gerald found employment with several circuses and was billed as 'Diabolo,' "the first man to loop the loop (inside a cage) on a motorcycle."

While still appearing in the circus industry, in 1907 he and two of his brothers, Lance Vane and Max Clifton, appeared in Charles MacMahon's Robbery Under Arms and in 1910 in another bushranger film The Life and Adventures of John Vane, the Notorious Australian Bushranger, directed by his father, S.A Fitzgerald.

Gerald's move into variety entertainment began in 1912 when he toured with his father's "All Stars" drama and vaudeville company as both comedian and acrobat. Clay Djubal suggests that after years of strenuous circus routines, his physical health may have necessitated the change. Later in 1912 he signed with Fullers' Theatres vaudeville circuit and Djubal suggests his early turns were often "comic routines that utilised his circus skills." In July 1913, while in New Zealand, he married fellow performer Essie Jennings (Esther Patience Futcher) and together they developed a highly popular knockabout comedy sketch act, appearing for Fullers in sketches such as "The Actress and the Paperhanger." Whilst working for Stanley McKay in 1914, Gerald developed his irascible pantomime dame characters, for which he became famous.

Gerald joined the Australian Army in May 1916, serving in the Middle East until his discharge in 1918, when he returned to the Fuller circuit. With Jennings he wrote the sketch The New Recruit or The Raw Recruit which proved to be a popular favourite. Over the next ten years he wrote and performed, often with his own company in numerous revues around Australia. He visited the US for several months in mid 1928, but it is impossible to verify the claim that he made thirty silent films while in Hollywood. Djubal suggests he came back with two films, one of which he exhibited as part of his performances. Staging and lighting of his shows changed as a result of what he observed during the trip.

Van Straten has described his "1935 attempt to conquer London" as unsuccessful. He appeared at the Garrick Theatre in Don't Spare the Horses in late 1935, where, although his skills as a comedian were acknowledged, reviews were mixed. He returned to Australia in May 1936. In the later 1930s, he became involved in radio, signing a contract with the Australian Broadcasting Commission in 1939.

In 1940 he rejoined the Australian Army, being given the rank of Lieutenant-Colonel and put in charge of the Entertainment Unit being set up to service troops in the Middle East. Michael Pate recalled Gerald's considerable ability as an organiser and producer in his history of Wartime Australian entertainment. Gerard chose performers "from the old school he knew best, [from] vaudeville and the musical stage." Following a recurrence of malaria he returned to Australia in October 1942 and returned to variety. Van Straten notes that after the war he also tried his hand at farce and drama.

He continued to perform in revues and variety until the 1960s, and was present when the Tivoli Theatre, Melbourne closed in 1966. After retiring from the stage Gerald moved to Rosebud, Victoria. He died there on 2 March 1971, Essie having predeceased him in 1969.

Djubal cites a reviewer for the Brisbane Courier who attempted to define Gerard's style of comedy in 1927: "The reason for Mr Gerald's success is not hard to find. His comedy does not depend upon knock-about antics...Jim Gerald's comedy is the outcome of a whimsical humour of his own... Such comedy playing is a gift, it is born in a man."
