= The Miner's Right : A Tale of the Australian Goldfields =

1880 novel by Rolf Boldrewood

- Author: Rolf Boldrewood
- Language: English
- Genre: Novel
- Publisher: The Australian Town and Country Journal
- Publication date: 1880
- Publication place: Australia
- Media type: Print

The Miner's Right : A Tale of the Australian Goldfields (1880) is a novel written by Australian author Rolf Boldrewood. It was originally serialised in The Australian Town and Country Journal in 47 weekly instalments between 3 January and 18 December 1880.

Its first print edition was published by Macmillan in the United Kindgom in 1890.

== Plot summary ==
Set in the 1850s and 1860s, the novel follows the story of Hereward Pole, an Englishman who has travelled to Australia to try his luck on the Turon goldfields in New South Wales, with the aim of returning home to marry Ruth Allerton, a local squire's daughter.

== Critical reception ==
Reviewing the first edition of the novel from Macmillan in 1890 The Sydney Morning Herald noted that, while this novel was not up to the standard of the author's classic Robbery Under Arms, what the author "tells his readers in this book is true to fact, faithful in description, and perhaps chiefly faulty from an artistic point of view in the ultra-propriety of its leading characters."

In his volume A History of Australian Literature, H. M. Green commented that, as a novel, "The Miner's Right is a failure, in spite of an interesting and sometimes exciting story and a fresh and lively style".

The Oxford Companion to Australian Literature states that the novel "has weaknesses of plot, style and characterization that led Joseph Furphy to parody it in The Buln-Buln and the Brogla (1948)". The Companion went on to note that the reason the novel has endured at all "derives from the strength of the minor characters", together with the fact that Boldrewood drew on his own experiences on the Gulgong goldfields for the plot.

== Publication history ==
After the novel's initial serialisation by The Australian Town and Country Journal in 1880, and its publication by Macmillan in 1890 it was reprinted as follows:

- 1890 Macmillan, UK
- 1891 Macmillan, UK
- 1893 Macmillan, UK
- 1895 Macmillan, UK
- 1898 Macmillan, UK
- 1899 Dymocks, Australia
- 1899 Whitcombe and Tombs, New Zealand
- 1899 Macmillan, UK
- 1899 E. W. Cole, Australia
- 1903 Macmillan, UK
- 1922 Macmillan, UK
- 1973 Sydney University Press, Australia
- 2004 Sydney University Press, Australia
