= Run, Chrissie, Run! =

- DVD cover
- Directed by: Chris Langman
- Screenplay by: Graham Hartley
- Based on: the novel When We Ran by Keith Leopold
- Produced by: Harley Manners
- Starring: Carmen Duncan; Michael Aitkens; Red Symons; Annie Jones; Nicholas Eadie
- Cinematography: Ernest Clark A.C.S.
- Edited by: Andrew Prowse
- Music by: Robert Kretschmer
- Production company: South Australian Film Corporation
- Distributed by: Australian Video (Australia); EuroVideo (Germany)
- Release date: 1984
- Running time: 95 minutes
- Country: Australia
- Language: English
- Budget: A$1,646,000

Run, Chrissie, Run! (also known as Money Hunters and Moving Targets in the US) is a 1984 Australian action thriller film, directed by Chris Langman. Graham Hartley adapted the script from the novel When We Ran by Keith Leopold. During production it was known as Reunion. Interior scenes were shot in the Adelaide suburb of Hendon.

The film is not connected in any way with the unproduced radio play Run, Chrissie, Run by Fay Weldon.

== Plot ==
"London"
Two Irish Republican Army hitmen are pursuing Riley because he killed one of their number.
"Sydney"
Riley is pursuing Eve, a German former terrorist, who is on the run in Australia with her teenage daughter Chrissie and the proceeds of an old bank robbery in Germany. The two IRA hitmen, accompanied by an angry biker, track Eve and Chrissie to the Barossa Valley. Riley arrives on the scene in time for an explosive finale.

== Cast ==
- Carmen Duncan as Eve
- Michael Aitkens as Riley
- Shane Briant as Terrier
- Redmond Symons as Pitt
- Nicholas Eadie as Toe
- Annie Jones as Chrissie
- David Clencie as Paul
- Peter Stratford as Meyerdahl
- Glen Boswell
- Hans Van Gyen
- Johnny Hallyday as Toe's Mates
- Simone Buchanan as Cathy
- Sarah de Teliga as Sue
- Roger L. Howell as Frank
- Allen Lyne as Pilot
- Edward Caddick as Clough
- Conor McDermotroe as Collins
- Heather Steen as Landlady
- Tony Gordon as Reporter
- Keith Hind as Bank Security
- John Hamblin as Cathy's Father
- Emma Salter as Principal
- Joanna Moore as Cricket Coach
- Melanie Saloman as Wicket Keeper
- Faith Kleinig
- Phyllis Burford as Gossips
- Dominic Bianca as Sydney Toughs

== Release ==
The film was made in 1984 but was not released theatrically as originally intended. It screened on Australian TV in 1988. It has been called an 1986 film in some references.

== See also ==
- Australian films of 1984
- Cinema of Australia
- List of Australian films
- South Australian Film Corporation
