= The Miner's Right =

Play by Alfred Dampier and Garnet Walch

- Original language: English
- Written by: Alfred Dampier; Garnet Walch
- Genre: Melodrama

Premiere
- Date: 14 February 1891
- Place: Alexandra Theatre, Melbourne

The Miner's Right is an 1891 play by Alfred Dampier and Garnet Walch based on a story by Rolf Boldrewood. It was highly successful and one of the most popular Australian plays of the 1890s.
