= Robbery Under Arms (1985 film) =

- Soundtrack cover
- Based on: Robbery Under Arms by Rolf Boldrewood
- Written by: Michael Jenkins
- Directed by: Donald Crombie; Ken Hannam
- Starring: Sam Neill; Steven Vidler; Christopher Cummins; Liz Newman; Jane Menelaus; Andy Anderson; Deborah Coulls; Susie Lindeman; Elaine Cusick; Ed Devereaux; Tommy Lewis; Robert Grubb
- Music by: Garry McDonald; Laurie Stone
- Country of origin: Australia
- Original language: English

Production
- Producers: Mace Neufeld; Jock Blair
- Cinematography: Ernie Clark
- Running time: 140 minutes
- Production company: South Australian Film Corporation
- Budget: AU$7.3 million

Original release
- Release: 28 March 1985

Robbery Under Arms is a 1985 Australian action adventure film starring Sam Neill as bushranger Captain Starlight.

There were two versions shot simultaneously – a feature film and a TV mini series. They were based on the 1888 novel of the same name by Rolf Boldrewood.

== Plot ==
Joined by bush larrikin, Ben Marston (Ed Devereaux), and Ben's two adventure-hungry sons (Steven Vidler and Christopher Cummins), Starlight leads his gang of wild colonial boys in search of riches, romance – and other men's cattle.

== Cast ==
Major characters

- Sam Neill as Captain Starlight
- Steven Vidler as Dick Marston
- Christopher Cummins as Jim Marston
- Liz Newman as Gracey Storefield
- Jane Menelaus as Aileen Marston
- Andy Anderson as George Storefield
- Deborah Coulls as Kate Morrison Mullockson
- Susie Lindeman as Jeannie Morrison
- Elaine Cusick as "Mum" Marston
- Ed Devereaux as Ben Marston
- Tommy Lewis as Warrigal
- Robert Grubb as Sir Frederick Morringer

Secondary cast

- David Bradshaw as Sergeant Goring
- John Dick as Trooper Fall
- Michael Duffield as Mr. Falkland
- Keith Smith as Trooper Spring
- Joe D'Amato as Trooper Sheerer (as David Hills)
- David Jobling as Rourke Bounty Hunter
- Edwin Hodgeman as Jack Benson
- Paul Chubb as Mungo
- Peter Cummins as Moran

== Production ==
Jock Blair first had the idea to remake the story in 1981 when he was working at the South Australian Film Corporation. It was originally envisioned that it would be a mini series but it was budgeted at a million dollars an hour which was felt to be too expensive. So it was decided to make a film as well at the same time, based on separate scripts.

There were two writers and two directors. Writing the script took two years.

The film was shot partly on location in the Flinders Rangers and at the SAFC studios in Adelaide. The two directors collaborated well together, and Ken Hannam was relieved to work with the SAFC again after the difficulties on Sunday Too Far Away.

Production took 20 weeks.

== Box office ==
Robbery Under Arms grossed $226,648 at the box office in Australia.

== Home media ==
Robbery Under Arms has been released twice by Umbrella Entertainment: as a two-part dual-layer DVD in a 16:9 transfer (DAVID 0477), also as a three-part two-disc DVD pack in the original 4:3 aspect ratio (DAVID2852) released September 2017.

=== Extras ===
Included is a 45-minute "special feature" On Location with Robbery Under Arms, filmed separately by SA Telecasters (Channel 10, which later became Channel 7). It shows much of the art, techniques and social atmosphere involved in the making of the film at Wilpena Pound and Hahndorf, as well as commentary by the major participants.

Producer/Director: Lou Sedivy
Technical producer: Greg Cameron
Technical directors: Mike McAuliffe and David Bates
Executive producer: Trevor Lanyon

== See also ==
- Cinema of Australia
