= The Life and Death of Captain Cook =

1888 play by Australian playwright John Perry

- Original language: English
- Written by: Alfred Dampier

Premiere
- Date: 28 January 1888
- Place: Gaiety Theatre, Sydney

The Life and Death of Captain Cook is an 1888 Australian play by John Perry presented by Alfred Dampier to celebrate Australia's centenary.

The play won a prize for the best play depicting the life of Captain James Cook.

== Critical reception ==
According to Leslie Rees, "Sydney had waxed happily excited from its public festivities, but even the genial tolerance of the Cook play’s first-night audience could not disguise a failure."

The Sydney Morning Herald said "As a literary production its dialogue is tame and mediocre, as a dramatic work the plot is loose and disjointed, and as a historical sketch the story is inaccurate and misleading."

The Daily Telegraph called it "a feeble play of the conventional type, lacking in continuity, in interest and in dramatic effect. The dialogue is bald and slipshod, and the actors and actresses were to be pitied as they bravely struggled through their evidently uncongenial task."
