= Garnet Walch =

Australian writer

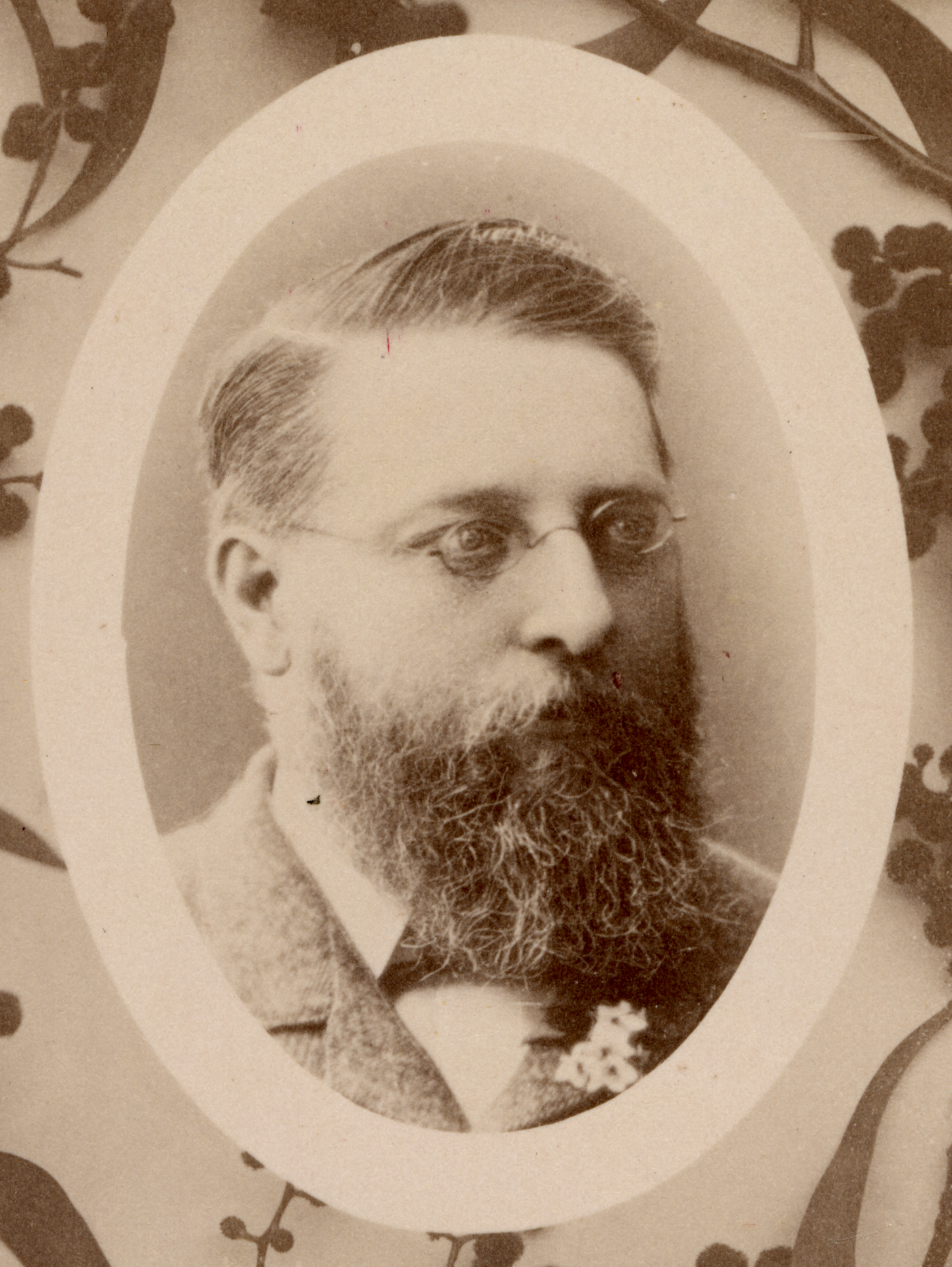
- Born: 1 October 1843; Broadmarsh, Van Diemen's Land
- Died: 3 January 1913 (aged 69); Surrey Hills, Melbourne, Victoria, Australia
- Resting place: Box Hill Cemetery, Melbourne
- Occupations: dramatist; journalist; publisher
- Spouse: Ada Kate Mullen (m. 1867)
- Children: 8
- Writing career
- Language: English
- Period: 1869–1897
- Genres: pantomime; burlesque; melodrama; comedy
- Notable works: Australia Felix (1873); Robbery Under Arms (1890); Victoria in 1880 (1881)

Garnet Walch (1 October 1843 in Broadmarsh, Van Diemen's Land – 3 January 1913 in Melbourne), was an Australian writer, dramatist, journalist and publisher. He wrote for The Australian stage during the 1970s and 1880s, across a wide range of genres and forms, including dramatic works, comedies, pantomimes, burlesques and variety sketches. While many of his works were localised and updated adaptations (notably his pantomimes), it was his ability to tap into the public's mood and desires by expressing sentiments and making satirical allusions that made his works so popular.

== Early life and education ==
Walch was born 1 October 1843 in Broadmarsh, Van Diemen's Land, the youngest son of Major J. W. H. Walch, of H.M. 54th Regiment. After this father died in 1852, Walch was educated at Denmark Hill Grammar School, London. He continued his schooling at a private college at Hamelin, on the Weser in Germany. He returned to Tasmania in 1860 to pursue work as a journalist. His elder brothers James and Charles had taken over their father's book selling and publishing business, J.Walch & Sons.

== Journalism ==
Walch moved to Sydney, where his first full-time writing position was with the Sydney Punch, whose editor, George Ross Morton, was himself an occasional dramatist. He contributed regularly to several Sydney papers and in 1867 took over editorship of The Cumberland Mercury at Parramatta and began his own newspaper, The Cumberland Times. The same year he published his first novel, The Fireflash (1867). In addition to his theatre work Walch was secretary to the Melbourne Athenaeum between 1873 and 1879.

== Theatrical career ==
A marked increase in theatrical production in Sydney during the late 1860s created opportunities for writers to adapt, localise and update overseas material. Throughout his career as a dramatist, Walch wrote for, and collaborated with, many of Australia's leading theatre industry practitioners of the period. His list of creative associations reads like a Who's Who of late 19th century Australian theatre: Harry Rickards, George Darrell, Alfred Dampier, Richard Stewart, William Saurin Lyster, J. H. Rainford, Mrs G. B. W. Lewis (aka Rose Edouin), and Alfred Sylvester.

He also wrote a stream of works for the Melbourne Theatre Royal's rather fluid management of Henry R. Harwood, Richard Stewart, J. R. Greville, John Hennings, and George Coppin, as well as for J. C. Williamson and scenic artist-turned manager W. J. Wilson. Several high-profile actors also benefited from Walch's writing talents, none more so than Bland Holt.

Walch and Alfred Dampier began a sustained creative partnership in 1889, after Dampier moved his operations from Sydney's Royal Standard Theatre to Melbourne's Alexandra Theatre. One of their first collaborations was a topical drama Marvellous Melbourne (1889), followed by an adaptation of Alexandre Duams's The Count of Monte Cristo (1890). Their greatest success is considered an adaptation of Rolf Boldrewood's novel Robbery Under Arms. First staged at the Alexandra Theatre in 1890, Robbery Under Arms proved to be a major contributor to the development of Australian drama.

Several of Walch's works were adapted by others, including Archibald Murray's Harlequin Blue Beard, The Great Bashaw (1872); Samuel Lazar's Hey Diddle Diddle The Cat and the Fiddle, the Cow Jumped Over the Moon (1878); and the burlesque Sinbad the Tailor (1881), adapted from Walch's 1880 pantomime Sinbad the Sailor. Walch's non-music theatre works include Heart and Head (sketch, 1881), Proof Positive (comedietta, 1883), and possibly the Harry Rickards-produced comic play In A Fog (1890).

The drought and economic depression of the early 1890s forced an end to Walch's theatrical writing career.

== Writer and publisher ==
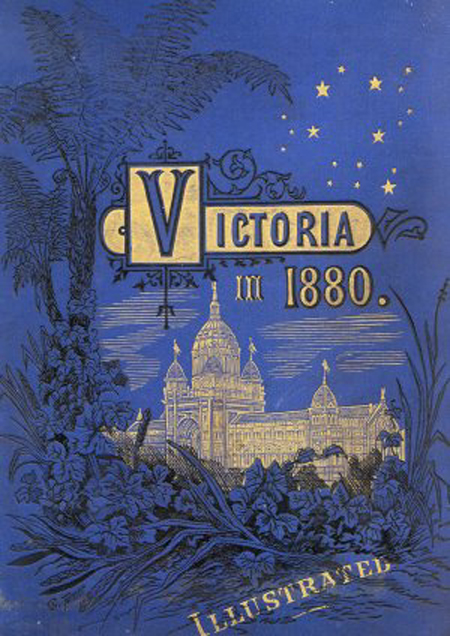
Book cover of Victoria in 1880 by Garnet Walch

As a publisher, his most outstanding work was Victoria in 1880, a de luxe book with lavish engravings by Charles Turner, compiled by Walch and published by George Robertson in Melbourne, celebrating the 1880–1881 International Exhibition. The book was inscribed to The Honourable William John Clarke, President of the Victorian International Exhibition Commission.

In 1883 he travelled to Madagascar for the Australasian and the Argus and as special correspondent. Upon his return he continued to write musical entertainments, pamphlets, articles, producing two books of verse, popular annuals, a number of miscellanies and biographies. In 1887 he became editor of the Centennial Printing and Publishing Company.

== Financial difficulties ==
In 1880 Walch sponsored a clandestine performance of Marcus Clarke's banned play The Happy Land, a political burlesque adapted by Clarke, with Robert P. Whitworth, from the 1873 English satire of the same name by Gilbert Arthur à Beckett and W. S. Gilbert (the latter writing as "F. Latour Tomline"). Clarke's localised version, which caricatured serving members of the Victorian government, was suppressed by the Premier and Chief Secretary Graham Berry, in January 1880 after only two performances. It was the first use of the government's power to prohibit a play in the colony of Victoria. To get around this, Walsh had chartered a steam boat at his own expense to carry the company to Frankston, which proved to be a financial disaster and he was declared bankrupt in October 1880.

Overwork and financial strain brought about a collapse for Walch early in 1882.

== Personal life ==
Walch married Ada Kate Ellard (died 13 July 1921) Their children included Kittie, Lizzie, Emily Clairellen ("Clair"), Albert Henry (died 28 May 1923), and Richmond. They had a home "Rubra" on Mont Albert Road, Mont Albert, Victoria.

He belonged to the bohemian circle of Melbourne along with Marcus Clarke. The poet Hugh McCrae recalled him as "a tremendous talker" and "shabbily dressed and distracted looking."

Walsh lived in retirement for many years at Surrey Hills, Melbourne. He died on 3 January 1913 of heart failure .

== Selected works ==
- A Little Tin Plate and other verses (1881)
- Silver Chimes (1892 play) – for the Greenwood family players
- Jack the Giant Killer or, Harlequin Fe-Fi-Fo-Fum, the Demon Spider and the Fairies of the Silver Lake (1891)
- The Trapper (1891) – with Alfred Dampier
- The Scout (1891) – with Alfred Dampier
- The Miner's Right (1891) – with Alfred Dampier
- Robbery Under Arms (1890) – with Alfred Dampier
- The Count of Monte Cristo (1890) – with Alfred Dampier
- Sleeping Beauty or, Harlequin Mother Goose and the Seven Champions of Christendom (1885)
- Bric-a-Brac, a musical comedy in two acts (1885)
- Dyk Whyttyngtonne and Hys Catte or, Arlekyn Lyttel Bo-Peepe and Ye Faerie Chymes of Bowe-Bells (1881)
- Gulliver or, Harlequin King Lilliput (1881)
- Sinbad the Sailor; or The Pet of the Pearl; The Old Man of the Sea; and the Dwarf of the Diamond Valley (1880)
- The Babes in the Wood (1879)
- Helen's Babies (1877)
- Beauty and the Beast, or Harlequin King Glorio the Millionth, the Island of Apes, and the Fairies of the Magic Roses (1875)
- Adamanta, the Proud Princess of Profusia, and her Six Unlucky Suitors (1874)
- Australia Felix or, Harlequin Jackass and the Magic Bat (1873)
- Orpheus (1872)
- Trookulentos, the Tempter or, Harlequin Cockatoo, the Demon of Discontent (1871)
- Prometheus or, The Man on the Rock (1870)
- Conrad the Corsair or, Conrad and Medora (1870)

=== Books ===
- The Fireflash
- The Australian Birthday Book (1887)
- A Life of General Gordon (1885)
