= Alfred Dampier =

Australian actor (circa 1843-1908)

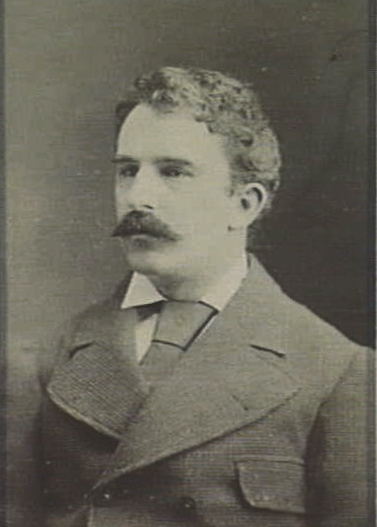
- Born: 28 February 1843; Horsham, Sussex, England
- Died: May 24, 1908 (aged 64–65); Paddington, New South Wales, Australia
- Occupations: Dramatist, actor, manager, director, producer.
- Years active: 1873–1908

Alfred Dampier (28 February 1843? 1847? – 23 May 1908) was an English-born actor-manager and playwright, active in Australia.

Dampier was born in Horsham, Sussex, England, the son of John Dampier, a builder, and his wife Mary, née Daly. Dampier had a stage career in Manchester before moving to Melbourne, Australia in 1873, under contract to the Harwood syndicate, consisting of H. R. Harwood, George Coppin, Richard Stewart (father of Nellie Stewart), and John Hennings, managers of Melbourne's Theatre Royal.

His first role was as Mephistopheles in his own adaptation of Goethe's Faust, followed by leading roles in Shakespearean dramas. After three years he undertook his own management and toured major towns in Australia and New Zealand, followed by America and England. He appeared in the Australian play All for Gold.

On his return to Australia, Dampier formed his own company, often producing plays with an Australian theme. He staged five plays by F. R. C. Hopkins between 1876 and 1882, and adapted For the Term of His Natural Life (1886), Robbery Under Arms (1890), and The Miner's Right (1891). A good number of actors stayed with Dampier through his changing fortunes — Carrie Bilton, Alfred Harford, Regel Rede, Alfred Rolfe, George Buller, Edmund Holloway, Julia Merton, Helen Nugent, J. B. Atholwood, Walter Baker, Watkin Wynne, Alfred Boothman, Ada Rochfort, May Holt (sister of Bland Holt), Harry Stoneham and Barry Marschall.

The two roles with which Dampier was most associated were Jean Valjean in Valjean, an adaptation of Les Misérables, and Captain Starlight in Robbery Under Arms.

He wrote (as "Adam Pierre") the jingoistic Briton and Boer, which was a "hit" at the Alexandra in 1900.

The Popular Australian Dramatic Company (1889–1890) and Australian Dramatic Company (1890–1897), not to be confused with George Darrell's "Australian Dramatic Company" (1878–1888), were affiliated with the Holloway company.

Dampier died at his residence in Paddington, Sydney on 23 May 1908.

== Family ==
In 1866 Dampier married the actress Katherine Alice Russell (c. 1848 – 8 March 1915), who continued using that name professionally. She was author of a play, The Phantom Ship. She died from a stroke in Reading, Pennsylvania while touring America with her daughter Rose and son Fred. They had two daughters and one son.

- Katherine Annabel Lily Dampier, known as Lily Dampier (died February 1915) was a noted actor in her own right. She was briefly married to actor William Watkins, known as Watkin Wynn. She subsequently married actor and director Alfred Rolfe, who adapted several of Dampier's plays to the screen.
- Rose Dampier died while on tour in Nebraska in May 1919.
- Alfred Julian "Fred" Dampier was also an actor, but never as successful as his father, sisters or brother in law. Fred had a secret marriage to one Vera (born c. 1885), also an actor, in 1905. They never lived together and she was granted a divorce in 1914.

== Select writing credits ==
- Valjean (1869) – adaptation of Les Misérables
- Faust and Marguerite (1873) – adapted from the legends
- Saint or Sinner (1876)
- Uncle Tom's Cabin (1879) - adapted from the novel
- The Nihilists (1880)
- Under the Southern Cross (1885)
- Uncle Tom's Cabin (1886) – with John F Sheridan, adapted from the novel
- Our Emily (1886)
- An English Lass (1886)
- Jess (1886)
- For the Term of His Natural Life (1886) – with Thomas Somers, adapted from the novel – later filmed as The Life of Rufus Dawes (1911)
- Marvellous Melbourne (1886) – with J H Wrangham and Thomas Somers
- Shamus O'Brien (play) (1889)
- East Lynn (1889)
- The Count of Monte Cristo (1890) – with Garnet Walch, adapted from the novel
- Robbery Under Arms (1890) – with Garnet Walch, adapted from the novel the novel – filmed as Captain Starlight, or Gentleman of the Road in 1911
- For Love and Life (1890)
- The Miner's Right (1891)
- The Scout (1891) - later revised as The Trapper
- This Great City (1891)
- Wilful Murder (play) (1892)
- Help One Another (1892)
- Slaves of Sydney
- Thou Shalt Not Steal (1896)
- To the West (play) (1896)
- The Bush King (1901) – rewrite of 1893 play – filmed in 1911
- Fortune's Fool

== Other plays presented ==
- The Life and Death of Captain Cook
- The Duchess of Coolgardie
