= William Blakeney =

William Blakeney may refer to:

- William Blakeney, 1st Baron Blakeney (1672–1761), Irish soldier in the British army
- William Blakeney (died 1804) (1735–1804), Irish British Army officer and politician
- William Theophilus Blakeney (1832–1898), Registrar-General of Queensland
