= Keith Leopold =

Australian author

- Born: July 30, 1920; East Maitland, New South Wales, Australia
- Died: 1999 (aged 78–79); Australia
- Occupations: Author, novelist, language textbook writer
- Writing career
- Genres: Young adult, Language Reference
- Notable work: When We Ran

Keith Leopold (30 July 1920 - 1999) was an Australian author of English, French and German language adventure novels for children and young adults, and German Language Reference books. He was born in East Maitland, New South Wales in 1920 and died in 1999.

== Biography ==
=== Early life ===
Leopold completed a German Honours course at the New England University College of the University of Sydney in 1942. The campus would later become the University of New England, effectively making him an alumnus of both universities.

He went on to serve in Australian Special Intelligence and later joined the Department of External Affairs.

In 1946 he joined the German Department of the University of Sydney as academic staff, and in 1947 became head of German at Queensland University.

He travelled extensively in Europe, especially Germany and spent time living there. In 1973 he was awarded the Distinguished Service Cross of the Order of Merit of the Federal Republic of Germany for his services to the study of German in Australia.

== Bibliography ==
- The time levels in Thomas Mann's Joseph the Provider (Published 1958)
- Meyer and M'erim'ee (1960) Queensland University Press
- Ricards Huch's Der letate Sommer : an example of epistolary fiction in the twentieth century (1962) Queensland University Press
- Ein Abenteuer in Deutschland; illustrated by H.E. Oiderman (1963) Angus & Robertson
- Introducing German (1964) Angus & Robertson
- Germany and the European novel : inaugural lecture delivered at the University of Queensland, 27 April 1965 (1966) Queensland University Press
- Andreas Gryphius and the Sieur de Saint-Lazare : a study of the tragedy Catharina von Georgien in relation to its French source (1967) Queensland University Press
- Nora aus der Fremde; Illustrated by Julie Mattox (1968) Angus & Robertson
- Introducing German (1969) Angus & Robertson
- Deutsche Teenager von heute : one hundred German passages for reading, comprehension and translation (1969) Angus & Robertson
- My Brow is Wet (1969) Angus & Robertson
- Key to 'Introducing German' (1972) McGraw Hill
- Die vier Kidnapper (1977) McGraw Hill
- Holly et les Terroristes
- When We Ran; Illustrated by Eva Wickenberg (1981) Rigby
- Fleur (1993) Eldorado
- Came to Booloominbah : a country scholar's progress, 1938–1942; edited and with an introduction by J.S. Ryan (1998) University of New England Press

=== Film adaptations ===
In 1986, the novel When We Ran was adapted as a screenplay by Graham Hartley for the film Run, Chrissie, Run!, directed by Chris Langman and starring Carmen Duncan and Red Symons.

== Awards ==
In 1985 When We Ran won the Avis Page award from WAYBRA, the West Australian Young Readers Book Award for Highest ranked Australian book on the older readers' list.
