= Ernie Clark (cinematographer) =

Ernie Clark, ACS is an Australian cinematographer known for the feature films Peaches, Run, Chrissie, Run! and Robbery Under Arms. He became president of the South Australian Branch of the Australian Cinematographers Society and assistant treasurer on the Federal Executive. He was inducted into the A.C.S. Hall of Fame in 2006.

== Career ==
Clark joined the film industry in 1971 as a trainee in the camera department at Browning Productions in Melbourne at the age of seventeen, where he was given an education in the film industry by director Mike Browning.

In 1976 Clark joined Total Film & Video Productions as lighting cameraman. A few years later he went freelance, filming TV commercials, as well as drama. His first major drama production was the mini series about Ned Kelly, The Last Outlaw, shot in 1980.

He shot a mini series for the South Australian Film Corporation and Adelaide became his adopted home. Apart from a stint as Director/DOP at Great Southern Films Melbourne in 1985–86, it was his base ever since.

During the early eighties Clark was involved in many feature film projects including the TV miniseries Robbery Under Arms and Under Capricorn, and the feature films Indecent Obsession and Run, Chrissie, Run!. Between these projects he filmed TV commercials for Directors Film & Video in Adelaide.

In 1986 he established the commercial production company Great Southern Films Adelaide.

Australian Cinematographers Society accreditation was bestowed on him in 1983.

In 2006 was inducted into the ACS Hall of Fame.

In 2003 the Adelaide Art Directors Club awarded Clark the President's Prize for services to the advertising industry. He has gained numerous awards for cinematography and direction including the AADC Master's Chair Craft Award in 2010.

He was actively involved in the SA branch of the ACS, joining the committee in 1996.

He became SA president in 2003 and was president and sponsorship co-ordinator from 2008.

Clark became one of the National Vice Presidents in 2008 and was involved in committees including Policy, Hall of Fame and Awards Categories. He judged many State and National ACS awards and was on a number of Accreditation panels.

Clark has a long history in advertising, working with some of the "world’s biggest brands and in particular automotive commercials such as Volkswagen, Mazda, Ford, Holden, Mitsubishi and Subaru",

== Awards ==
Clark won the A.C.S. Features Gold award for Peaches in 2004.

He was inducted into the ACS Hall of Fame in 2006.

In March 2010, he won the "highly coveted Masters Chair award" at the 33rd Annual Adelaide Advertising and Design Club Awards.

Most recently (2010), Clark won the A.C.S. Gold award for the Rural Bank "Symphony" Television Commercial.

== Selected filmography ==
=== Cinematographer ===
- The Last Outlaw (TV mini-series) (1980)
- The Coast Town Kids (TV series) (1980)
- Sara Dane (TV movie) (1982)
- Chase Through the Night (TV movie) (1983)
- Under Capricorn (TV mini-series) (1983)
- The Settlement (1984)
- Run, Chrissie, Run! (1984)
- An Indecent Obsession (1985)
- Robbery Under Arms (1985)
- Body Business (TV movie) (1986)
- Vaudeville (TV documentary) (1992)
- Peaches (2004)
- You Better Watch Out (short) (2006)
- The Agreement (short) (2006)
- A World Away (short) (2008)
- Injury Time (short) (2014)

=== Director ===
- Spank! (1999)
- Moloch (2001)
