= Robber (disambiguation) =

A robber is someone who engages in robbery.

Robber(s) or The Robber(s) may also refer to:

- Robber (TV series), a 2008 South Korean TV series
- The Robber, a 2010 German film directed by Benjamin Heisenberg
- The Robbers, a 1782 play by Friedrich Schiller
- The Robbers (film), a 1962 Spanish crime film directed by Francisco Rovira Beleta
- The Robber (novel), a novel by Robert Walser written in 1925
- "Robbers" (The 1975 song), 2014
- "Robbers" (Youngblood Hawke song), 2017
- Die Räuber (opera) or The Robbers, a 1957 opera by Giselher Klebe
- Robber (film), a 2025 Tamil crime thriller film
- "The Robbers" (Outnumbered), a 2009 television episode

== See also ==
- Brycinus or robber tetras, a genus of ray-finned fish in the family Alestiidae
- David "Robber" Lewis (1790–1820), American criminal
- Robber barons (disambiguation)
- Robbery (disambiguation)
