= Robbery Under Arms (play) =

Play by Alfred Dampier and Garnet Walch

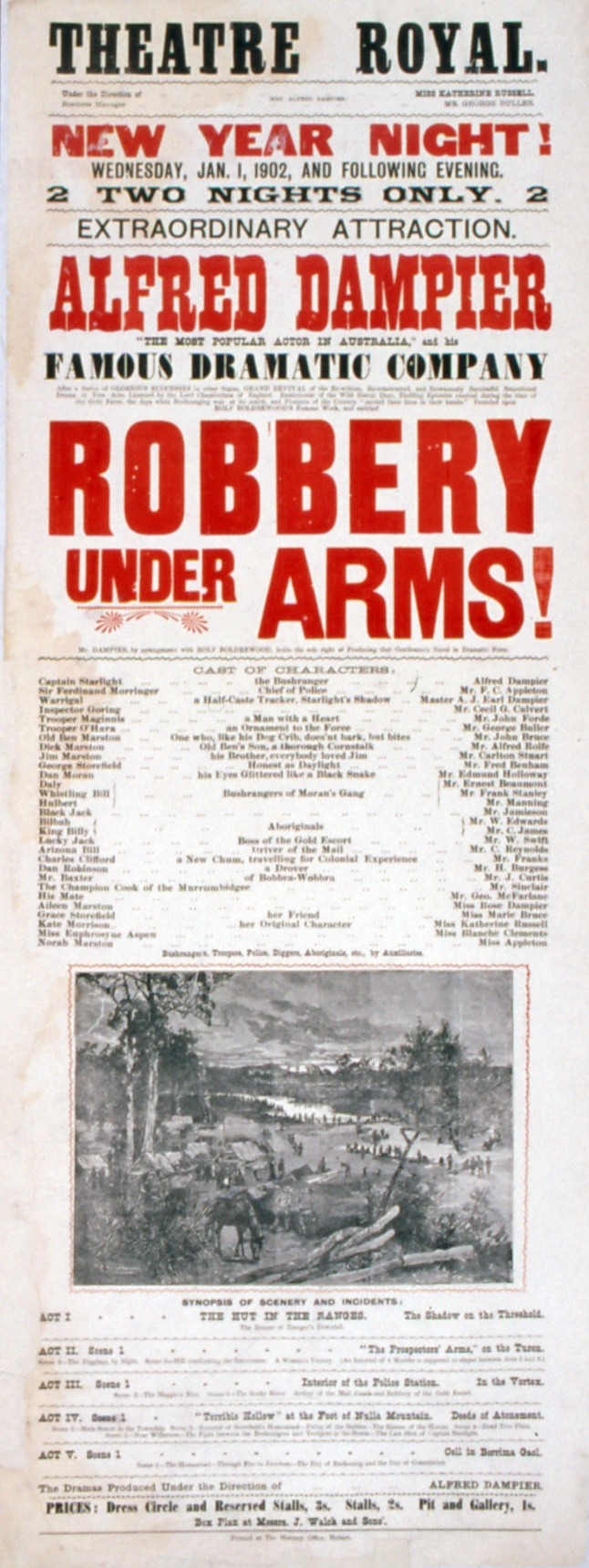
- Poster from a 1902 production
- Written by: Alfred Dampier; Garnet Walch
- Original language: English
- Genre: Melodrama

Premiere
- Date premiered: 1 March 1890
- Place premiered: Alexandra Theatre, Melbourne

Robbery Under Arms is an 1890 play by Alfred Dampier and Garnet Walch based on the novel of the same name by Rolf Boldrewood.

== History ==
In 1889 Dampier secured the exclusive rights to prepare a dramatization of the Boldrewood novel.

This was not an easy task, as the novel is mostly first person descriptive, with very little dialogue, and great sections had to be omitted, notably the opening chapter, in which "Captain Starlight" takes 2000 head of stolen cattle overland from country New South Wales to Adelaide.

The play premiered on March 1, 1890, following Walch's dramatization of Victor Hugo's Count of Monte Cristo.

== Opening night ==
The play was staged on 1 March 1890 at the Alexandra Theatre, Melbourne, which Dampier had on a long lease. T. A. Browne and family were guests of honour in a stage box. The following were principal players that evening:

- Alfred Dampier as Captain Starlight
- Walter E. Baker as Dick Marston, his loyal lieutenant
- Watkin Wynne (Note: Watkin Wynne was stage name for actor/architect William Watkins who was briefly married to Lily Dampier. Nothing further has been found.) as Jim Marston, the amiable reluctant outlaw
- Edmund Holloway as Ben Marston
- Lily Dampier as Aileen Marston
- Alfred Boothman as George Storefield, an industrious settler
- Carrie Bilton as Billy the Boy
- Harry Stoneham as the cold-blooded villain Dick Moran
- J. B. Atholwood as Warrigal, the Aboriginal hero
- Katherine Russell as the vengeful Kate Morrison
- Julia Merton as elderly spinster Euphrosyne Aspen, a comic character
- J. Caesar, as trooper Maginnis, another comic character
- Reg Rede, trooper O'Hara, also a comic character

Six years later the play had evolved somewhat with a couple of new characters but very few cast changes:

- F. C. Appleton as Sir Ferdinand Merringer
- Charles Field as Inspector Goring
- George Buller as trooper O'Hara
- Belcher as trooper Maginnis
- Alfred Rolfe as Dick Marston
- Herbert Forrest as Jim Marston

== Background ==
In collaboration with journalist Garnet Walch, Dampier adapted the novel into a play in 1890. The play made some key changes to the story, such as:

- making Dick Marston and Captain Starlight both innocent of murder, enabling them to be both pardoned;
- Starlight was no longer killed and Dick Marston did not serve 12 years in gaol;
- Sub Inspector Goring, a relatively minor character in the novel was turned into more of a villain, harassing Aileen Marston;
- the major villain was bushranger Dan Moran;
- the climax involves Moran holding Sir Ferdinand captive in Terrible Hollow, rescued by Starlight;
- it ends with Moran attempting to stab Dick Marston, killing Kate Morrison who saves Dick's life;
- the addition of comic Irish policemen, O'Hara and Maginnis, plus a comic maid, Miss Euphrosyne Aspen (variations on these characters appeared in plays based on the Kelly Gang);
- changing the character of Warrigan from a villainous type loyal to Starlight to a comic character.

The play drew heavily on the story of Ned Kelly and his family – in particular Constable Fitzpatrick's harassment of Kate Kelly, which inspired Goring's treatment of Martson – as well as the themes of the novel Les Misérables.

It is considered likely Garnet Walch's main contribution to the play was providing a comic subplot.

== Impact ==
The play was highly successful and was much revived during the 1890s and 1900s, including performances in London in 1894. Dampier played the role of Captain Starlight on stage many times to great acclaim, and it was the role he was most identified with during his career.

Alfred Rolfe, who later directed the movie adaptation, was well versed with the play, having played Sir Ferdinand Morringer in its first production, George Storefield in a revival, and Dick Marston in later productions. In 1893 he married Dampier's daughter Lily, who played Aileen Marston in numerous productions of the play.

The play was highly influential on bushranging drama as a genre, leading to a number of imitators such as Arnold Denham's The Kelly Gang (1899), which was likely the basis for the film The Story of the Kelly Gang (1906).

== Sources ==
- Fotheringham, Richard, "Introduction", Robbery Under Arms by Alfred Dampier and Garnet Walch, Currency Press 1985
