= Robbery Under Arms (1907 Tait film) =

1907 film

- Based on: Robbery Under Arms by Rolf Boldrewood
- Produced by: John Tait; Nevin Tait; Johnson & Gibson
- Release date: 31 October 1907
- Running time: over 5,000 feet or nearly two hours
- Country: Australia
- Languages: Silent; English intertitles

Robbery Under Arms is a 1907 Australian film based on the popular 1888 novel. It was from the team of John and Nevin Tait and Millard Johnson and William Gibson, who had just made The Story of the Kelly Gang. It is considered a lost film.

Another film based on the same the book came out the same year, from the MacMahon brothers, which was filmed in Sydney. This has led to some confusion as to whether the Tait-Johnson-Gibson film even existed.

== Plot ==
According to a contemporary newspaper report, "All the incidents of the romantic bushranger Starlight are enacted, from the first incident, the branding of stolen cattle, to the "Last stand of Starlight and the Marston boys." An advertisement for the film, to be shown at the Oddfellows' Hall in Wagga Wagga on the 8th and 9 January 1908, describes Robbery Under Arms as "The Greatest Series of Dramatic moving Pictures Ever Taken". It details the major scenes in the film as "such well-known and famous incidents as – The First Downward Step, Captain Starlight Wounded by Police, The Cattle Sale, Terrible Hollow, The Runaway and Rescue, The Marstons at St. Kilda, Berrima Gaol, Sticking up the Goulburn Mail, Kate Morrison's Revenge, Robbing the Gold Escort, The Bushranger's Last Stand, and numerous other great and dramatic situations".

The action was condensed into six scenes.

== Production ==
The film was completed by 10 October 1907. It was shot in Melbourne

The film was reportedly made at "enormous expense" and included location filming.

== Reception ==
The film was typically screened on a program including film of the 1907 Melbourne Cup and a film of snake catching.

The film often screened in the same city as the 1907 Charles MacMahon version.

Table Talk wrote the film had "an almost startling realism."

The Age said "The pictures were clear and convincing, and the series was well arranged and capitally shown."

The Fremantle Empre said "the scenes are entirely Australian. They give one a most comprehensive and picturesque series of scenes of the bush of our own land, and the incidents of the bushranging drama enacted in this gi£at wild naturetheatre is thrilling in. its realism, and true even to the minutest details. The story is elaborately told on the screen, and so numerous are the incidents that the major part of the programme is devoted to it, and/yet one tires not, and -rttien the end comes wished for more."

The West Australian called it "undoubtedly the finest Australian picture yet exhibited."
