= MacMahon brothers =

Australian theatre entrepreneurs

The MacMahon brothers were entrepreneurs in Australian show business. Chief among them were James MacMahon (1856 or c. 1858 – 29 April 1915) and Charles MacMahon (c. 1861 – 27 June 1917), who together and separately toured a large number of stage shows. Their younger brothers, Joseph (died November 1918) and William (died August 1923), were involved in many of those activities.

In later years James acquired the nickname "Mighty Atom", perhaps a reference to Marie Corelli's novel. and Charles had some success as a filmmaker.

== History ==
The MacMahon brothers were born in Sandhurst, Victoria (later Bendigo), sons of Patrick MacMahon, contractor, and his wife Mary Ann, née Delany. (Note: Dr Williams was a researcher with the School of Theatre and Film Studies, University of New South Wales.)

James MacMahon was early attracted to the theatre, and at age 17 joined a stage management company that brought the tragedienne Mrs Scott-Siddons to the Academy of Music, Ballarat for a two-night season of dramatic readings on 21–22 October 1876.

Scott-Siddons' 1876 Australian tour began on 4 May when she arrived aboard the City of San Francisco, under contract to Samuel Lazar. She played Rosalind in As You Like It at the Theatre Royal, Sydney from 13 May. followed by Juliet in Romeo and Juliet, Lady Teazle in The School for Scandal, Portia in The Merchant of Venice, and so on, all to capacity crowds. Her season at the Theatre Royal, Melbourne began on 15 July for Harwood, Stewart, Hennings and Coppin. She played the name role in Edmund Phipps' adaptation of King Rene's Daughter and Juliana in Tobin's The Honey Moon. After her brief appearance at Ballarat she returned to Melbourne's Theatre Royal in time for the racing season.

She performed a series of readings at the Masonic Hall, Bendigo for MacMahon on 29–30 November 1876 before leaving for New Zealand. She returned to Melbourne in May 1877, then shortly to Adelaide for a three-day program of readings at White's Rooms, then to the Theatre Royal to poor attendance figures, and country centres before returning to the Rooms. She returned to Melbourne with a poorly-attended matinee at the Athenaeum Hall, Melbourne and more country recitals, culminating in four evenings of plays, organised by MacMahon at the Royal Princess Theatre, Bendigo, 3–6 October 1877. He acted as her business manager for the country appearances, then was appointed for her Tasmania season. After a "brilliant season, which he managed so successfully", MacMahon was retained as her manager and as her husband's personal assistant, leaving Australia with them in July 1878 on the SS City of Sydney, and remained her manager for seven years, touring the world. Siddons retired from the stage in 1884 and after negotiating rights to Henry Irving's production of Romeo and Juliet, James MacMahon returned to Australia by the SS Rome.

His brother Charles MacMahon was lessee and manager of Royal Princess Theatre, Sandhurst (Bendigo) 1881–1883 and one of his first acts was to bring Madame Boema to Bendigo. He was lessee of Princess's Theatre, Melbourne from 1883, and managed Grattan Riggs' first Australasian tour in 1883.

=== MacMahon Leitch company ===
In December 1884 George Leitch joined the MacMahon brothers, taking a lease on the Theatre Royal, Hobart. They secured rights to Called Back; (Note: The thriller Called Back was written by "Hugh Conway" and adapted by J. Comyns Carr) Joseph Derrick's Confusion; The Private Secretary; (Note: This farce was adapted in 1883 by Charles Hawtrey from the German Der Bibliothekar by Gustav von Moser, as was Leitch's own The Librarian, first staged in Australia in 1886.) Merritt and Harris's Youth, The Lights o' London, and Moths, (Note: Henry Hamilton's adaptation of the Ouida novel of the same name) as well as plays written by Leitch before he left England. They toured Australia's eastern States and New Zealand with The Silver King 1885–1886. During the tour they brought out His Natural Life, Leitch's stage version of T. A. Browne's novel For the Term of His Natural Life, and claimed to be the only authentic version, opened on 26 April 1886 at the Theatre Royal, Brisbane, followed by Adelaide 29 May 1886, Sydney 5 June 1886, Melbourne 26 June 1886. The MacMahon-Leitch Company disbanded in Auckland at the end of their New Zealand tour and the principals took a holiday in Fiji. They then successfully sued Wellington Evening Post and the Press Association for publishing a report implying they had left Hamilton with debts unpaid.

The combination was again active in Australia two years later, playing His Natural Life in February 1889, with Leitch, Alice Deorwyn, G. R. Ireland, Wilson Forbes, and Blanche Lewis at the Theatre Royal, Hobart, and March 1889 with The Silver King at the Academy of Music, Ballarat.

=== John Sheridan ===
They arranged John Sheridan's Australian tour of August 1889 – October 1890.

=== Evangeline ===
In 1890 James MacMahon and his brother Joseph MacMahon visited America, and contracted a company led by Virginia Earle, George K. Fortescue (the 20 stone (130 kg) female impersonator), and Joseph Harris, to stage a revival of Edward E. Rice's burlesque Evangeline in Australia. The company arrived by the SS Alameda in March 1891 and opened in Melbourne at the Opera House, Melbourne on 27 April, the Criterion Theatre, Sydney on 20 June and Her Majesty's Opera House, Brisbane on 8 August. A feature of Evangeline was "The Lone Fisherman" part, played by Harris. This character appeared in every scene but said nothing and took no part in the proceedings, but was always doing something, whether fishing, playing cards with himself or cheekily interacting with the audience, and Harris became a crowd favorite. Rice's opera bouffe The Corsair opened in Brisbane 24 August, Melbourne 3 October, Sydney 14 November. They lost money on Evangeline and The Corsair, they closed the season at the Theatre Royal in December 1891, and paid off the actors and stage crew.

=== The County Fair ===
In 1891 they brought out from America Neil Burgess's The County Fair, starring Frank J. Currier and Sadie Stringham. The production featuring a horse race on stage, with real galloping horses, the illusion provided by a treadmill stage and moving backdrop. These American imports were expensive however, and though popular at first could not sustain public interest and, like Evangeline, County Fair lost money for the Macmahons, resulting in their bankruptcy.

In 1892 James MacMahon organised a concert party which had a successful tour of British India, Burma, The Strait Settlements and Java. Among the company was the Australian violinist Lydia Elizabeth "Bessie" Doyle, later known as Eileen O'Moore.

John L. Sullivan, the popular boxer, failed to draw the crowds when he played in Willing Hands and Honest Hearts, written by his manager Duncan B. Harrison. The sad irony was that MacMahon was compelled to take Sara Bernhardt off the stage to make way for Sullivan.

In 1894 they joined with Richard P. Kenna to produce Morocco Bound, viewed by some as the first musical comedy, at the Lyceum Theatre with William Elton and Wilfred Shine in the cast.

In 1897 James MacMahon took over the Lyceum Theatre, which had been idle for some time, and instituted a series of quality productions at modest prices, featuring such actors as Alfred Dampier.

=== Novelties ===
In 1890 the MacMahon brothers brought to Melbourne one Professor Douglas Archibald MA Oxon to demonstrate Edison's phonograph, first demonstrated 26 June at the Athenaeum, and at the Centenary Hall, Sydney in October. Among the cylinders he brought with him was a message recorded by Gladstone for Lord Carrington, Governor of New South Wales, recorded in London on 2 March 1890:

"My Dear Lord Carrington,— I gladly avail myself of this opportunity to assure you with how much pleasure I hear of you and your career as Governor in New South Wales. I am also alike honored and gratified in being the first person to make a communication through the phonograph to Australia as worthily represented by the great colony at whose head you have been placed. For the phonograph is a new bond of amity between Australasia and the United Kingdom, and I regard each addition to these free and friendly ties as an Imperial benefit and a fresh guarantee for the endurance of a connection alike honorable and beneficial on that side of the water and on this.— I have the honor to remain, my dear Lord Carrington, faithfully W. E. Gladstone".

It has been asserted that four months earlier, James MacMahon imported an Edison phonograph which was not publicly exhibited but shown to a few influential people, including Sir Henry Parkes, for whom Agent-General Sir Saul Samuel had recorded a personal message.

In 1892, when in financial difficulties, the MacMahons sold to George Kelly their exclusive right to exhibit Edison's phonograph.

They also brought an early kinetoscope to Sydney, demonstrating the instrument with some of Lumiere's moving pictures, the first of the kind.

=== New Zealand ===
The MacMahon brothers became closely identified with New Zealand, both as theatrical and picture-show managers.

In 1899 the MacMahon brothers were sued by a stage carpenter who was underpaid when an opera season failed to turn a profit.

=== 20th-century ===
The MacMahons gave a demonstration of moving pictures at a Pitt Street store, claimed the first such in Sydney, close to where Film House later stood.

James MacMahon returned to Sydney around 1910. He died of pneumonia in a private hospital at Petersham on 29 April 1915, and was buried the following day.

Charles MacMahon made several silent feature films, including the first film versions of Robbery Under Arms (1907) and For the Term of His Natural Life (1908). Both are considered lost films.

Charles MacMahon died in Melbourne.

== Family ==
Patrick MacMahon, contractor, and his wife Mary Ann, née Delany, had four sons involved in theatre management:

- James "Mighty Atom" MacMahon (c. 1856 or c. 1858 – 29 April 1915), with whom Charles was partner in many theatre business ventures.
- Charles MacMahon (c. 1861 – 27 June 1917) formerly co-lessee of "New Theatre" with brother Joe.
- Joseph "Joe" MacMahon (c. 1861 – 22 November 1918) theatre manager in New Zealand, most recently the Queen's Picture Theatre, Auckland.
- William MacMahon (died August 1923), schoolteacher; also silent partner and occasional business manager for Charles. From 1885 he acted as manager for Dion Boucicault and other artists, later as theatre manager in Sydney.
