= Robbery Under Arms (1907 MacMahon film) =

1907 film

- Directed by: Charles MacMahon
- Written by: Charles MacMahon
- Based on: Robbery Under Arms by Rolf Boldrewood
- Starring: Jim Gerald
- Cinematography: C. Byers Coates
- Release date: 1 October 1907
- Running time: 5,000 feet (over 60 min.)
- Country: Australia
- Languages: Silent; English intertitles
- Budget: £1,000

Robbery Under Arms is a 1907 Australian silent western/drama film based on the 1888 novel by Rolf Boldrewood about two brothers and their relationship with the bushranger Captain Starlight. It was the first film version of the novel and the third Australian feature ever made.

It is considered a lost film, and is not to be confused with another version of the novel that came out the same year.

== Synopsis ==
Key scenes of the film included the branding of the stolen cattle by the Marstons, the stealing of the horse 'Marquis of Lorne', the capture of Starlight and Dick Marston, the robbery of the mail coach, the bail up of the gold escort, the sticking up of Whitmans', the attack on Keightley station, the ride of Mrs Keightley to raise the ransom, the escape from Berrima Gaol and Starlight's last stand.

== Cast ==
- J. Williams as Starlight
- Jim Gerald ("S. Fitzgerald") as Warrigal
- Mrs W. J. Ogle as Mrs Keighley
- George Merriman as warder
- Lance Vane as Inspector of Police
- William Duff as trooper
- Arthur Guest as curate
- Rhoda Dendron

== Production ==
Charles MacMahon made the movie after working for five years in New Zealand. It seems likely that the script was taken directly from the novel, and not any stage adaptation of the book (which was the case with the 1911 version, Captain Starlight, or Gentleman of the Road).

Shooting took place over six weeks with a cast of twenty five. Locations included Narrabeen, Hornsby, Moss Vale, Wollongong racecourse, Bathurst, the Turon, and Flemington sale yards, among other places.

The cinematographer was C Byers Coates, who worked for the film firm of Osborne and Jerdan. Coates shot 10,000 feet of film all up which was later processed at Osborne and Jerdan's premises in George Street, Sydney.

The budget has been given as £900 or £1,000.

The role of Warrigal, the aboriginal tracker, was played by Jim Gerald who later became a major vaudeville star; it was one of his few film roles. (He may have been billed as "Fitzgerald".)

== Reception ==
The movie was often shown on a double bill with a live vaudeville show, sometimes with two actors dressed up in costume.

It was a popular success at the box-office, seen by 30,000 people in Sydney ("hundreds turned away") and ran for 12 weeks in Melbourne during its initial season. It ran in cinemas for three years.

The critic for the West Australian said that "some of the bush scenes are very beautiful, and at the same time intensely interesting. Mrs. Keightley's ride to Bathurst in quest of the ransom for her husband's life and the 'sticking up' of the Eugowra gold escort were realistic items."

The Sunday Sun wrote, "the picture was extremely well conceived, and was shown with a commendable degree of clearness."

In New Zealand, screenings were accompanied by opera sung by Howard Vernon and Vinia de Loitte.

== See also ==
- List of Australian films before 1910
