= Robbery (disambiguation) =

Robbery is the attempt to take the property of another by threat of force.

Robbery may also refer to:

== Film and television ==
=== Film ===
- Robbery (1897 film), a British silent comedy short directed by Robert W. Paul
- The Robbery (film), a 1953 Turkish film directed by Sami Ayanoglu
- Robbery (1967 film), a British crime film directed by Peter Yates
- Robbery (1985 film), an Australian television film

=== Television episodes ===
- "The Robbery", an episode of Seinfeld
- "The Robbery" (Kitchen Confidential)
- "The Robbery" (Laverne & Shirley)

== Music ==
- Robbery (album), by Teena Marie, 1983
- "Robbery" (Juice Wrld song), 2019
- "Robbery" (Lime Cordiale song), 2019
- "Robbery", a song by Biffy Clyro, a B-side of the single "Mountains", 2008
- "The Robbery", a song by Anne Dudley from the Buster film soundtrack, 1988
- "Robberies" (song), by King Von, 2023

== Sports ==
- "Robbery", the 2010s FC Bayern München combination of Frank Ribéry and Arjen Robben

== See also ==
- Robber (disambiguation)
- Robbery Under Arms (disambiguation)
