= Frank Pearson =

Australian bushranger (c. 1837–1899)

Frank Pearson (c. 1837–22 December 1899) was an Australian bushranger, operating under the pseudonym Captain Starlight.

Pearson claimed he was the inspiration for the character Captain Starlight in Rolf Boldrewood's novel of 1882–1883, Robbery Under Arms. Boldrewood denied the claim and stated that the character was a composite of several bushrangers of the era, including Henry Readford, and primarily Thomas Smith, alias Captain Midnight. The cattle thief Readford did not use a pseudonym himself and had no connection with Pearson.

== Early life ==
Pearson's early life is a mystery as he gave a range of different versions of his background. In his earlier prison records he claimed he was born in London and that he had arrived in Australia in 1866. Later he claimed to be from America; he also told friends that he was born in Mexico of a Spanish mother and Irish father. He used so many aliases that his origins are obscure; however, he may have been connected to a family with the surname Arnold.

== Notoriety ==
In September 1868, as Doctor Frank Pearson, he teamed up with stockman Charley Rutherford and robbed the shop, the Yarrambah Post Office, and Angledool Station in New South Wales before heading to Enngonia also in New South Wales, some 100 km (62 mi) from Bourke, New South Wales. Two police constables, McCabe from New South Wales and McManus from Queensland, set out from Walgett, New South Wales to catch the bushrangers but became lost. The Police patrol stopped for supplies in Enngonia and were making a purchase at the Shearer's Inn when Pearson and Rutherford entered the inn yelling Bail Up. Both constables opened fire hitting Pearson in the arm and wrist while Pearson returned fire hitting McCabe in the chest. The two bushrangers then fled to Belalie where they stole fresh horses before continuing down the Darling River to near Pooncarie where they split up and went their separate ways. Pearson travelled north, robbing several stations along the way before heading toward Mount Gunderbooka, 70 km (43 mi) south of Bourke.

A police party tracked Pearson to Mount Gunderbooka but he eluded them in the thick scrub of the mountain. Based at the foot of the mountain and stationing men at the waterholes to prevent Pearson from access to water, the party chased him for three days before capturing him on Christmas Day, in a small cave, weakened from lack of water and badly bitten by bull ants. Constable McCabe had died from his injury in November and Pearson was charged with murder. Committed for trial on 4 January 1869 Pearson was found guilty at trial on 3 May 1869 and sentenced to death. The sentence was later commuted to life imprisonment and he was released in 1884 after fifteen years. The commutation of his sentence was controversial. There is some evidence to suggest that William Munnings Arnold, Parliamentary Speaker of the time, may have influenced the decision.

According to legend, in 1884 bushrangers stopped at the local police station in Barmera, South Australia, where they locked the police in their own cells. The leader of the gang then rode his horse into the bar of the Overland Corner Hotel and carved his name into the wall. No trace remains of the name and his identity is disputed with some claiming it was Captain Moonlite. However it is known that Pearson was active in the area at the time.

== Later life ==
Pearson returned to Queensland and in 1887 was arrested for forgery and false pretences, under the name of Frank Gordon (alias Dr Lamb), tried in Rockhampton and sentenced to a year in prison in Brisbane. He was admitted to Boggo Road Gaol and shortly afterwards, transferred to St. Helena Island. It was while in prison here that Pearson boasted that he was the inspiration for Boldrewood's Captain Starlight. While in prison he met fellow prisoner Major Patrick Edward Pelly and, from his release, Pearson adopted that name. Upon his release from St Helena, Pearson was re-arrested, tried at Toowoomba, and imprisoned (again as Frank Gordon) in the Toowoomba Gaol for another three months. As Patrick "Frank" Pelly he lived in South Australia for around two years, working as a drover. He is not known to have committed any serious crimes during this time. In 1896 he moved to Perth where, as Major Patrick Frances Pelly he was employed on the recommendation of the WA Premier, Sir John Forrest, as a clerk-accountant with the Geological Survey of Western Australia. In Perth he often related elaborate and false stories of his past as a major in the British army and a member of the Russian Czar's bodyguard.

== Death ==
On 22 December 1899, Pearson died after accidentally swallowing cyanide. He was drunk and mistook it for his medicine. He is buried in Karrakatta Cemetery, Western Australia.
