= Thomas Alexander Browne =

Australian author (1826–1915)

Commissioner Thomas Alexander Browne
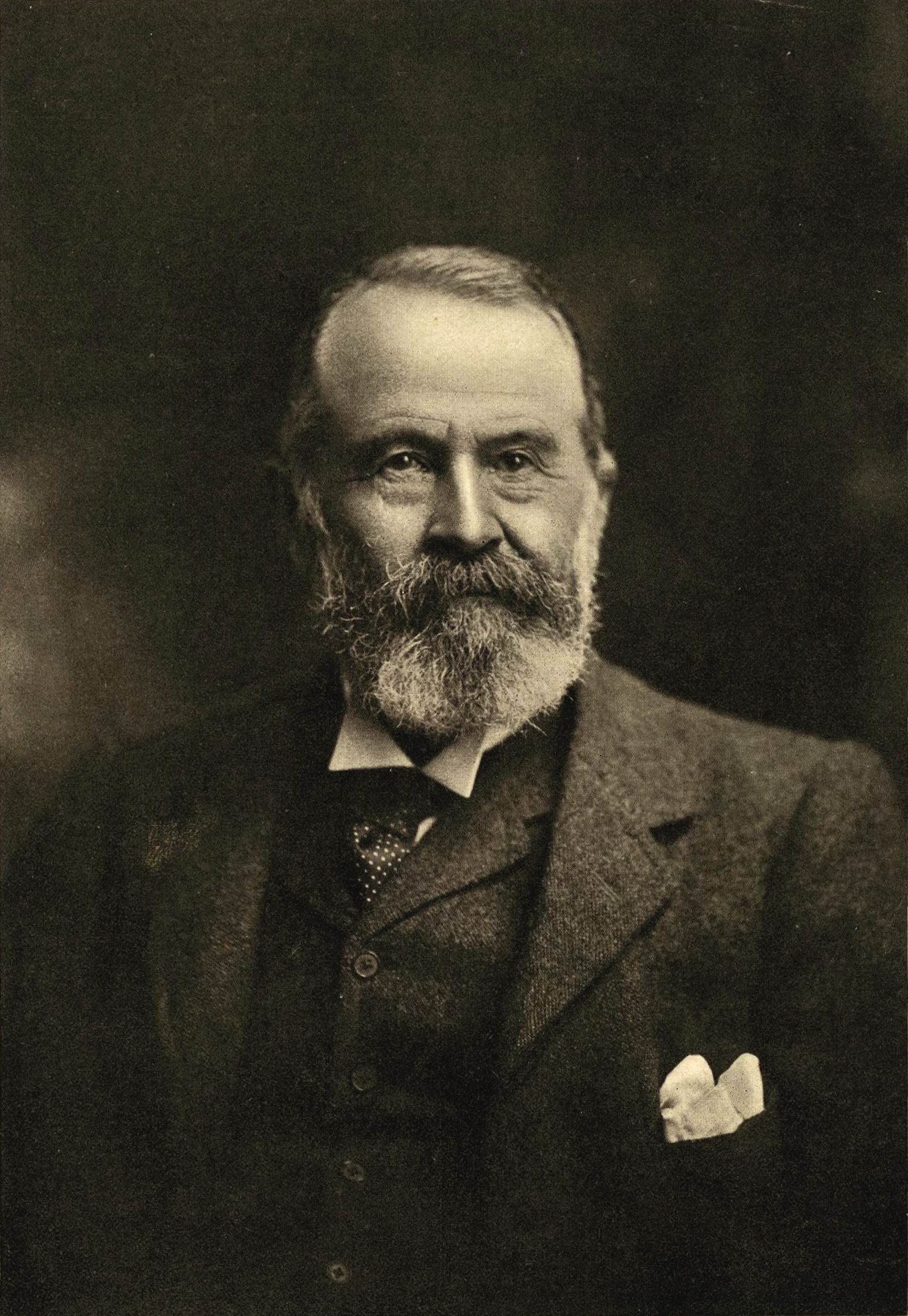

Personal details
- Born: 6 August 1826 London, England
- Died: 11 March 1915 (aged 88) South Yarra, Victoria, Australia
- Education: Sydney Grammar School

Thomas Alexander Browne (born Brown, 6 August 1826 – 11 March 1915) was a British-born Australian police magistrate and author. He published many of his works under the pseudonym Rolf Boldrewood. He is best known for his 1882 bushranging novel Robbery Under Arms. He served as the goldfields commissioner in New South Wales. In his capacity as police magistrate and warden of goldfields, he was entrusted with the administration of justice at Gulgong, Dubbo, Armidale, and Albury. He acted as police magistrate during the period between 1870 and 1895.

== Early years ==
Browne was born in London, England. He was the eldest child of Captain Sylvester John Brown, a captain of the East India Company, and Elizabeth Angell Browne (née Alexander). His mother was his "earliest admirer and most indulgent critic . . . to whom is chiefly due whatever meed of praise my readers may hereafter vouchsafe" (Dedication Old Melbourne Memories). Thomas added the 'e' to his surname in the 1860s. After his father's barque Proteus had delivered a cargo of convicts in Hobart, the family settled in Sydney in 1831. Sylvester Brown took up whaling and built a stone mansion, Enmore, which gave its name to the suburb of Sydney. One of Browne's closest school friends was a son of Colonel John George Nathaniel Gibbes, MLC, the Collector of Customs for New South Wales, and according to the Dulhunty Papers, Browne spent carefree holidays staying with the Gibbes family at their grand waterside residence on Sydney's Point Piper.

When his father moved to Melbourne in 1839, Browne remained at Sydney College as a boarder until 1841 and then was taught by Rev. David Boyd in Melbourne. He visited England in 1860 and in 1862–1863 had a property, Murrabit run at Lake Boga near Swan Hill, followed by Bundidgaree station on the Murrumbidgee River near Narrandera in the Riverina in 1864. After living in Sydney a short time, in April 1871 he was appointed a police magistrate at Gulgong and gold commissioner in 1872.

Browne was an experienced justice of the peace, having acted as chairman of the bench of justices at Narrandera, but in his first years at Gulgong, then one of the richest and largest goldfields in New South Wales, his ignorance of mining and the complicated regulations drew criticism of his competence as commissioner. He was persistently attacked by the Gulgong Guardian until in 1873 it published an anonymous letter accusing him of bias and corruption. Its editor Thomas Frederic De Courcy Browne was thereupon convicted in Sydney of criminal libel and sentenced to six months gaol. The charges against Browne were disproved, and he won favour with the miners by magnanimously interceding with the judge for a light punishment of his libeller. In 1881, Browne was transferred as magistrate and mining warden to Dubbo and to Armidale in 1884. He moved to Albury as chairman of the Land Licensing Board in 1885, serving there as magistrate and warden from 1887 to 1895 until retiring to Melbourne. He died on 11 March 1915 in Melbourne and was buried in Brighton Cemetery.

Browne married Margaret Maria Riley (daughter of W. E. Riley and granddaughter of Alexander Riley) in 1860. Fourth daughter Louisa Browne married mine manager Robert Silvers Black on 11 June 1903.

His sister, Emma, married Molesworth Richard Greene of Woodlands, near Sunbury. His brother Sylvester John Browne was a mine manager. His daughter Emma Browne married Ernest Street, the son of Australian politician John Street, who was the patriarch of the Street family. He is the namesake of the Rolf Boldrewood Literary Awards were awarded annually from 2006 to 2017 by the Macquarie Regional Library.

== Literary career ==
Browne spent around twenty-five years as a squatter and about the same time as a government official, but his third career as author extended over forty years. In 1865, while recovering from a riding accident, he wrote two articles on pastoral life in Australia.

The name Boldrewood came from a line in the poem Marmion by Browne's favourite author, Sir Walter Scott.

At the beginning of the novel Robbery Under Arms, the narrator, Dick Marston, is awaiting execution for crimes committed whilst he was a bushranger. He goes on to tell the story of his life and loves and his association with the notorious Captain Starlight. Some of the events in the book are based on actual incidents carried out by contemporary bushrangers like Daniel Morgan, Ben Hall, Frank Gardiner, James Alpin McPherson and John Gilbert. Robbery under Arms has remained popular since its first publication in 1888; the novel was filmed in 1907 (a version by Tait brothers and a version by Charles MacMahon), 1920 and 1957. A television series was made in 1985. The novel has also been serialised on radio in both Australia and Britain.

== Bibliography ==
=== Novels ===
- My Run Home (1874)
- The Squatter's Dream: A Story of Australian Life (1875) [aka Ups and Downs : A Story of Australian Life]
- A Colonial Reformer (1876)
- Babes in the Bush (1877) [aka An Australian Squire]
- The Miner's Right : A Tale of the Australian Goldfields (1880)
- Robbery Under Arms (1882)
- The Sealskin Coat (1884–1885) [aka The Sealskin Mantle]
- The Crooked Stick, or, Pollie's Probation (1885) [aka The Final Choice, or, Pollie's Probation]
- The Sphinx of Eaglehawk: A Tale of Old Bendigo (1887)
- A Sydney-Side Saxon (1888)
- Nevermore (1889–1890)
- A Modern Buccaneer (1894)
- Plain Living: A Bush Idyll (1898)
- War to the Knife', or Tangata Maori (1899)
- The Ghost-Camp, or, The Avengers (1902)
- The Last Chance: A Tale of the Golden West (1905)

=== Short story collections ===
- A Romance of Canvas Town and Other Stories (1898)
- In Bad Company and Other Stories (1901)

=== Autobiography ===
- Browne, Thomas (1896), Old Melbourne Memories (2nd ed.), London: Macmillan Publishers, Wikidata Q19084469 – via Wikisource

=== Non-fiction ===
- S. W. Silver & Co's Australian Grazier's Guide : 1. Sheep [and] II. Cattle (1879)
- S. W. Silver & Co.'s Australian Grazier's Guide (1879)
- S. W. Silver & Co.'s Australian Grazier's Guide : No. II – Cattle. (1881)
