= List of Australian films before 1910 =

This is a chronological list of Australian films by decade and year for years 1890s–1910s. For a complete alphabetical A-Z list, see Category:Australian films.

A list of films produced in Australia by year, from the 1890s to the end of the 1910s, in the List of Australian films.

== Pre 1910s ==
Title	Director	Cast	Genre	Notes
1896
Passengers Alighting from Ferry Brighton at Manly	Marius Sestier		Short	27 October IMDb
The Melbourne Cup	Marius Sestier	Henry Walter Barnett, Lord Brassey	Sports documentary	24 November IMDb a series of 10 films about the Melbourne Cup Carnival
New South Wales Horse Artillery in Action	Marius Sestier		Short documentary	IMDb
Patineur Grotesque	Marius Sestier		Short comedy	Not released until 28 March 1897 (Lyon) IMDb
1897
Prince Ranjitsinhji Practising Batting in the Nets	Henry Walter Barnett	Ranjitsinhji	Sports documentary	IMDb one of a series of 4 cricket films
1898
Melbourne Street Scene	Joseph Perry		Short	ABC Wayback machine
Social Salvation	Herbert Booth		Short documentary	1 July IMDb
Torres Strait Islanders	Alfred Cort Haddon		Short documentaries	
1899
North Shore Steam Ferry	Frederick Wills		Short	Sydney
Newtown Railway Station	Frederick Wills		Short	Sydney
Dipping Sheep	Frederick Wills		Short documentary	Queensland Department of Agriculture
South Sea Islanders Cutting Cane	Frederick Wills		Short documentary	Queensland Department of Agriculture
Sugar Mills, Nambour	Frederick Wills		Short documentary	Queensland Department of Agriculture
Threshing at Allora	Frederick Wills		Short documentary	Queensland Department of Agriculture
Wheat Harvesting with Reaper and Binder	Frederick Wills		Short documentary	Queensland Department of Agriculture
SS Katoomba Unloading	Frederick Wills		Short	Queensland Department of Agriculture
Building Construction	Frederick Wills		Short	Queensland Department of Agriculture
Boer War Transvaal Contingent	Frederick Wills		Short documentary	Troops leaving for the Boer War
Loading Horses on the SS Cornwall	Frederick Wills		Short	Horses for the Boer War
Darnley Islanders Pay Tribute	Henry Mobsby		Short documentary	Torres Strait
Opening of Queensland Parliament	Frederick Wills		Short	
Government Party Boards SS Lucinda	Frederick Wills		Short	Brisbane
Queen Street and Victoria Bridge	Frederick Wills		Short	Brisbane
Roma Street Station	Frederick Wills		Short	Brisbane
1900
Second Victorian Contingent Leaving Melbourne	Joseph Perry		Documentary	Troops leaving for the Boer War
Soldiers of the Cross	Herbert Booth, Joseph Perry	Beatrice Day, Harold Graham	Christian drama	13 September IMDb
1901
Inauguration of the Commonwealth	Joseph Perry		Documentary	1 January IMDb
Royal Visit to Open the First Commonwealth Parliament	Joseph Perry		Documentary	9 May IMDb
Aboriginal Life	Walter Baldwin Spencer		Documentary	
1902
Under Southern Skies	Joseph Perry		Documentary	
Lazarus	Joseph Perry		Christian drama	
1904
The Melbourne Cup	Franklyn Barrett		Sports documentary	1 November IMDb first film of the whole race from start to finish
1906
The Story of the Kelly Gang	Charles Tait	Elizabeth Tait, John Tait	Biography drama	26 December Considered the first full-length feature film ever made IMDb
1907
Eureka Stockade	Arthur Cornwall, George Cornwell		Short	19 October IMDb
Robbery Under Arms	Charles MacMahon	Jim Gérald, George Merriman, Lance Vane	Drama	1 October – Based on novel IMDb
Robbery Under Arms	John Tait, Nevin Tait		Drama	31 October – Based on novel; considered lost
1908
The Grand Memorial Service	Joseph Perry		Documentary	
The Great White Fleet Visits the Antipodes	Joseph Perry	Great White Fleet	Documentary	August–September IMDb
For the Term of his Natural Life	Charles MacMahon	Martyn Keith, Rosie Knight Phillips	Short	8 August IMDb
The Burns-Johnson Fight	Ernest Higgins	Jack Johnson, Tommy Burns	Sports documentary	28 December IMDb
1909
Heroes of the Cross	Joseph Perry	Vida Dutton	Christian drama	IMDb
The Scottish Covenanters	Joseph Perry	Iza Crossley, Beatrice Day	Christian drama	IMDb
