= List of Australian films =

== 1890s–1930s ==
Australian filmmakers were at the forefront of cinema and film, having created what is considered the first feature-length narrative film with the release of The Story of the Kelly Gang and other early films by directors John Gavin, W. J. Lincoln and Alfred Rolfe.

Notable Australian films of the 1890s:

- Passengers Alighting from Ferry Brighton at Manly (1896) – first film produced and screened in Australia
- The Melbourne Cup (1896) – multiple reel sports documentary of the Melbourne Cup Carnival
- Patineur Grotesque (1897) – comedy roller-skater routine originally filmed in 1896
- Prince Ranjitsinhji Practising Batting in the Nets (1897) – featuring Ranjitsinhji one of the earliest surviving cricket films
- Social Salvation (1898) – documentary about living conditions produced by Herbert Booth for the Salvation Army in Australia

Notable Australian films of the early 1900s:

- Soldiers of the Cross (1900) – religious drama produced by the Limelight Department of the Salvation Army
- Inauguration of the Commonwealth (1901) – multiple reel documentary of the Federation of Australia
- The Story of the Kelly Gang (1906) – world's first feature-length film
- Moora Neya, or The Message of the Spear (1911) – one of the first films to depict Indigenous Australians
- The Sentimental Bloke (1919) – made by Raymond Longford and Lottie Lyell, one of the first, best known and most successful silent era films with a first-person narrative, the best-known partnership in Australian film at that time
- Robbery Under Arms (1920)

Director - Kenneth Brampton. Captain Starlight - Kenneth Brampton. Ben Marsden - Stephen Australia Fitzgerald

- For the Term of His Natural Life (1927) – based on the novel by Marcus Clarke; the most expensive Australian silent film ever made

Notable Australian films of the 1930s:

- On Our Selection (1932) – comedy based on the Dad and Dave stories by Steele Rudd
- In the Wake of the Bounty (1933) – first film to star Errol Flynn, an iconic Australian "swashbuckler" character
- The Squatter's Daughter (1933) – directed by Ken G. Hall, one of the most popular Australian films of the 1930s

== 1940s–1970s ==
The mid-1900s had a slow start for Australian film, although the first Academy Award was won for an Australian film, Kokoda Front Line!. The industry picked back up during the 1970s with one of the first internationally released films, Picnic at Hanging Rock, and with the success of the series of Mad Max franchise films.

Notable Australian films of the 1940s–1950s:

- Forty Thousand Horsemen (1940) – one of the most successful films of its day
- Kokoda Front Line! (1942) – first Australian film to win an Oscar, for Best Documentary Feature in 1942
- Sons of Matthew (1949) – popular drama by Charles Chauvel
- Jedda (1955) – first Australian film to have two indigenous lead actors
- Conquest of the Rivers (1958) – AFI winner for Best Film
- Hard to Windward (1958) – AFI winner for Best Film
- Edge of The Deep (1959) – AFI winner for Best Film
- The Power Makers (1959) – AFI winner for Best Film

Notable Australian films of the 1960s:

- Three in a Million (1960) – AFI winner for Best Film
- Bypass to Life (1962) – AFI winner for Best Film
- Night Freighter (1962) – AFI winner for Best Film
- The Land That Waited (1963) – AFI winner for Best Film
- The Dancing Class (1964) – AFI winner for Best Film
- I, the Aboriginal (1964) – AFI winner for Best Film
- The Legend of Damien Parer (1965) – AFI winner for Best Film
- Stronger Since The War (1965) – AFI winner for Best Film
- Clay (1965) – Cannes Festival official entry
- They're a Weird Mob (1966) – said to have been one factor leading to the founding of the Australian film industry; based on the novel of the same title
- Concerto for Orchestra (1966) – AFI winner for Best Film
- Cardin in Australia (1967) – AFI winner for Best Film
- The Change at Groote (1968) – AFI winner for Best Film
- The Talgai Skull (1968) – AFI winner for Best Film
- Jack and Jill: A Postscript (1969) – AFI winner for Best Film
- Skippy and the Intruders (1969) – spin-off of the Skippy the Bush Kangaroo TV series

Notable Australian films of the 1970s:

- Three To Go: Michael (1970) – AFI winner for Best Film
- Nickel Queen (1970)
- Homesdale (1971) – AFI winner for Best Film
- Walkabout (1971) – first film appearance of David Gulpilil
- Stork (1972) – AFI winner for Best Film
- Wake in Fright (1971)
- Marco Polo Jr. Versus the Red Dragon (1972) – Australia's first animated feature film
- Libido (1973) – AFI winner for Best Film
- 27A (1973) – AFI winner for Best Film
- The Cars That Ate Paris (1974) – directed by Peter Weir
- Stone (1974) – directed by Sandy Harbutt
- Sunday Too Far Away (1975) – AFI winner for Best Film, acclaimed for its realistic character portrayal
- Picnic at Hanging Rock (1975) – one of the first Australian films to reach an international audience; based on the book of the same title
- The Devil's Playground (1976) – AFI winner for Best Film
- The Chant of Jimmie Blacksmith (1976) – multi-award-winning film
- Don's Party (1976) - won six AFI Awards, including Best Direction and Best Screenplay. Based on the 1971 play of the same name
- Storm Boy (1977) – AFI winner for Best Film
- The Getting of Wisdom (1977) – nominated for 5 AFI Awards and winner of Best Adapted Screenplay
- Newsfront (1978) – winner of 8 AFI awards including Best Film and Best Actor: Bill Hunter.
- Mouth to Mouth (1978) – AFI nominee Kim Krejus
- Mad Max (1979) – held world record as the highest profit-to-cost ratio of a motion picture; introduced Mel Gibson to an international audience
- My Brilliant Career (1979) – AFI winner for Best Film
- Tim (1979) – winner of 3 AFI Awards, including Best Actor: Mel Gibson

== 1980s ==
The Man from Snowy River was a highly acclaimed Australian film released in the 1980s, along with Crocodile Dundee which boosted the nation's economy and tourism industry. The Year My Voice Broke is also held in high regard.

Notable Australian films of the 1980s:

- Breaker Morant (1980) – nominated for an Oscar for Best Screenplay; AFI winner for Best Film
- Gallipoli (1981) – AFI winner for Best Film; Gallipoli is an important historical Australian event
- Mad Max 2 (1981) – AFI winner for Best Direction, Costume Design, Editing, Production Design and Sound
- Lonely Hearts (1982) – AFI winner for Best Film
- Running on Empty (1982) – classic Australian drag racing movie
- The Man from Snowy River (1982) – award-winning, iconic film
- BMX Bandits (1983) – earliest film appearance of Nicole Kidman
- Careful, He Might Hear You (1983) – AFI winner for Best Film
- Phar Lap (1983) – based on the successful New Zealand racehorse
- The Slim Dusty Movie (1984) – based on the Australian country musician and singer Slim Dusty
- Annie's Coming Out (1984) – AFI winner for Best Film
- Fortress (1985) – won American Cinema Editors for direction of Photography in 1986
- Bliss (1985) – AFI winner for Best Film
- Burke & Wills (1985) – AFI nominations for Best Music Score and Best Cinematography
- Crocodile Dundee (1986) – received international acclaim; nominated for an Oscar for Best Screenplay
- Malcolm (1986) – AFI winner for Best Film; one of the first films starring Colin Friels
- For Love Alone (1986) – five AFI Award nominations; nominated for a Golden Bear at the Berlin Film Festival; starring Hugo Weaving, Sam Neill, and Naomi Watts in her first film appearance
- The Lighthorsemen (1987) – about an Australian Light Horse unit
- The Year My Voice Broke (1987) – often cited by critics as the best Australian film in the past 25 years; AFI winner for Best Film
- Dogs in Space (1987) – cult film set in the post-punk "little band scene" in Melbourne in 1979.
- Ground Zero (1987) – Aboriginals and service personnel exposed to dangerous radiation levels, either carelessly or as "human guinea pigs"
- Rikky and Pete (1988) – directed by Nadia Tass
- Ghosts… of the Civil Dead (1988) – directed by John Hillcoat
- Sebastian and the Sparrow (1988) – directed by Scott Hicks
- Evil Angels (A Cry in the Dark) (1989) – AFI winner for Best Film and Meryl Streep Best Actress Oscar Nominee
- Houseboat Horror (1989) – featuring Alan Dale from Neighbours
- Dead Calm (1989) – included on The New York Times Top 1000 Movies list
- Sweetie (1989) - Directed by Jane Campion. With Geneviève Lemon, Karen Colston, Tom Lycos, Jon Darling. An introspective young woman's life is upturned by the arrival of her maladjusted sister.

== 1990s ==
The 1990s saw the release of the successful Muriel's Wedding and The Adventures of Priscilla, Queen of the Desert in 1994 and The Castle in 1997. Strictly Ballroom was also a successful and influential release.

Notable Australian films of the 1990s:

- Death in Brunswick (1990)
- Flirting (1990) – AFI winner for Best Film
- The Big Steal (1990) – AFI winner for Best Actor, Best Score, and Best Screenplay
- Proof (1991) – AFI winner for Best Film; one of the first major films starring Russell Crowe and Hugo Weaving
- Romper Stomper (1992) – multi-award-winning film; one of the first major films starring Russell Crowe
- Strictly Ballroom (1992) – nominated for Golden Globe, with additional 16 wins and 11 further nominations; AFI winner for Best Film
- The Piano (1993) – New Zealand co-production; won 3 Oscars and received a further 5 nominations; AFI winner for Best Film
- Sirens (1994) – starred Hugh Grant, Tara Fitzgerald, Sam Neill and Elle Macpherson
- Bad Boy Bubby (1994) – won four AFI awards: Best Director (Rolf de Heer), Best Actor in a Leading Role (Nicholas Hope), Best Original Screenplay and Best Editing
- Metal Skin (1994) – FCCA award for best actor Aden Young, Ben Mendelsohn; AFI award for best achievement in sound and best achievement in production design
- Muriel's Wedding (1994) – AFI winner for Best Film; had worldwide success; the first major film for Toni Collette and Rachel Griffiths
- The Adventures of Priscilla, Queen of the Desert (1994) – cult classic; now a performing musical production; the first large-scale appearance of Guy Pearce and Hugo Weaving
- The Sum of Us (1994) – Russell Crowe, Jack Thompson
- Dad and Dave: On Our Selection – Leo McKern, Joan Sutherland and Geoffrey Rush
- Angel Baby (1995) – AFI winner for Best Film
- All Men Are Liars (1995) – starred Toni Pearen, David Price, and John Jarratt
- Babe (1995) – won an Oscar for Best Achievement in Visual Effects; nominated for a further six
- Così – AFI winner for best screenplay; 2 other nominations; ensemble piece starring Barry Otto, Toni Colette, David Wenham and Ben Mendelsohn
- Shine (1996) – AFI winner for Best Film; Geoffrey Rush won Best Actor Oscar
- Idiot Box (1996) – starring Ben Mendelsohn and Jeremy Sims
- Hotel de Love (1996) – Aden Young, Saffron Burrows
- Love and Other Catastrophes (1996) – nominated for 5 AFI awards
- Dating the Enemy (1996) – starring Guy Pearce and Claudia Karvan
- Romeo + Juliet (1996) – a modern version of the Shakespeare tragedy, directed by Baz Luhrmann
- Love Serenade (1996) – director/writer Shirley Barret with actors Miranda Otto and Rebecca Frith
- Kiss or Kill (1997) – AFI winner for Best Film
- Doing Time for Patsy Cline (1997) – 10 AFI nominations; winner of 4, including Best Actor
- The Castle (1997) – low-budget box-office success, received national acclaim
- Year of the Dogs (1997) – documentary film; AFI winner of Best Editing in a Non-Feature Film
- Road to Nhill (1997) – won the Golden Alexander award at the International Thessaloniki film festival
- The Wiggles Movie (1997)
- Blackrock (1997) – nominated for 5 AFI awards; the movie debut of Heath Ledger
- Oscar and Lucinda (1997) – nominated for an Oscar for Best Costume Design; nominated for 7 AFI Awards and winner of 5; starring Ralph Fiennes and Cate Blanchett
- Crackers (1998)
- Dead Letter Office (1998) – Miranda Otto
- Radiance (1998) – nominated for 6 AFI Awards; winner for Best Actress: Deborah Mailman
- The Boys (1998) – nominated for 13 AFI awards; winner of 5, including Best Director
- The Interview (1998) – AFI winner for Best Film
- Paperback Hero (1998) – Hugh Jackman, Claudia Karvan
- Two Hands (1999) – AFI winner for Best Film
- Soft Fruit (1999) – written and directed by Christina Andreef

== 2000s ==
The 2000s in the history of Australian film have seen mixed success, including Moulin Rouge! revitalizing the musical film genre, award-winning short film Harvie Krumpet, and box office success Happy Feet.

Notable Australian films of the 2000s:

- The Dish (2000) – internationally successful film which presents a somewhat fictionalised account of the Parkes Observatory's role in the Apollo 11 Moon landing
- Bootmen (2000) – multi-award-winning film, one of the first films starring Sam Worthington and Adam Garcia
- Better Than Sex (2000) – David Wenham, Susie Porter
- The Magic Pudding (2000) – Sam Neill, Geoffrey Rush, Hugo Weaving, Jack Thompson, Toni Collette and John Cleese
- He Died with a Felafel in His Hand (2001) – Noah Taylor
- Chopper (2000) – multi-award-winning, influential film based on the character of Mark Brandon "Chopper" Read
- On the Beach (2000) – two AFI nominations (Armand Assante, Rachel Ward, Bryan Brown, Jaqueline McKenzie, Grant Bowler, Steve Bastoni)
- The Wog Boy (2000) – Nick Giannopoulos, Vince Colosimo, Lucy Bell
- Looking for Alibrandi (2000) – AFI winner for Best Film
- The Bank (2000) – high-tech thriller capitalising on strong anti-bank sentiment
- Silent Partner (2001) – low-budget film about mateship between two losers
- Lantana (2001) – AFI winner for Best Film
- Moulin Rouge! (2001) – widely credited with revitalising the musical genre of film; won 7 major awards and 10 nominations
- Crocodile Dundee in Los Angeles (2001)
- The Man Who Sued God (2001) – AFI nomination for Best Original Screenplay (Don Watson); starring Billy Connolly, Judy Davis and Colin Friels
- One Night the Moon (2001) – AFI winner and New York International Independent Film & Video Festival Genre award winner; a musical (winner, Screen Music Awards, Australia) based on the true story of a young girl who went missing in the Australian outback in 1932
- WillFull (2001) – willful ghost of a parent returns
- The Tracker (2002) – AFI winner for Best Actor: David Gulpilil
- Rabbit-Proof Fence (2002) – AFI winner for Best Film; based on the book Follow the Rabbit-Proof Fence; stirred debate over its historical accuracy
- Crackerjack (2002) – Mick Molloy, Bill Hunter
- Australian Rules (2002)
- The Nugget (2002)
- Dirty Deeds (2002) – 3 wins and 9 nominations
- The Master of Disguise (2002)
- The Hard Word (2002) – 5 wins and 8 nominations
- Swimming Upstream (2002) – Geoffrey Rush, Judy Davis, Jesse Spencer, Tim Draxl
- Trojan Warrior (2002) – Stan Longanidis, Arthur Angel, John Brumpton
- Cracker Bag (2003) – Cannes Palme d'Or winner; AFI winner for both Best Short Fiction Film; Best Screenplay in a Short Fiction Film
- Danny Deckchair (2003) – Rhys Ifans, Miranda Otto
- Harvie Krumpet (2003) – won Oscar for Best Short Film (Animated)
- Gettin' Square (2003) – AFI winner for Best Film; AFI winner for Best Actor: David Wenham
- Take Away (2003)
- Japanese Story (2003) – AFI winner for Best Film
- Undead (2003)
- Love's Brother (2004)
- Strange Bedfellows (2004)
- Peaches (2004) – Hugo Weaving, Jacqueline McKenzie, Emma Lung, Matthew Le Nevez
- Somersault (2004) – AFI winner for Best Film
- One Perfect Day (2004) – FCCA winner Best Music Score, IF winner Best Sound, ASDA winner Best Director of a First Feature, eight AFI Nominations
- Wolf Creek (2005) – seven AFI Nominations, including Best Director (John Jarratt, Nathan Phillips)
- Look Both Ways (2005) – AFI winner for Best Film
- The Proposition (2005)
- Ra Choi (2005)
- The Illustrated Family Doctor (2005) – Samuel Johnson, Colin Friels, Jessica Napier, Sacha Horler
- The Magician (2005)
- Three Dollars (2005) – based on the novel by Elliot Perlman; starring David Wenham and Frances O'Connor
- Monster-in-Law (2005)
- Little Fish (2005) – Cate Blanchett, Hugo Weaving and Noni Hazlehurst all won AFI awards for this film set in Sydney
- Opal Dream (2006) – Vince Colosimo, Jacqueline McKenzie, Christian Byers, Sapphire Boyce
- BoyTown (2006) – Glenn Robbins, Mick Molloy, Bob Franklin, Wayne Hope, Gary Eck
- Kenny (2006) – AFI winner for Best Actor
- Ten Canoes (2006) – first film made with entirely native Australian Aboriginal spoken languages; AFI winner for Best Film
- Candy (2006) – Abbie Cornish, Heath Ledger and Geoffrey Rush in a film about love and how drugs affect one's life
- Jindabyne (2006) – set in Jindabyne, starring Laura Linney and Gabriel Byrne
- Happy Feet (2006) – first Australian film to win an Oscar for Best Animated Feature Film
- Who Killed Dr Bogle and Mrs Chandler? (2006) – an answer to Australia's largest murder mystery and winner of Most Outstanding Documentary in the 2007 Logies
- Last Train to Freo (2006)
- Kokoda (2006)
- Romulus, My Father (2007) – Australian Film Institute Award for Best Film winner, starring Eric Bana
- Lucky Miles (2007)
- The Final Winter (2007)
- The Jammed (2007) – winner, Best Film, Best Music, Best Script IF Awards; 7 AFI nominations; considered by some leading critics to be the best Australian film of 2007; achieved the highest screen average opening week for any independent Australian film in history
- Clubland (2007)
- Noise (2007)
- Rogue (2007)
- Black Water (2007)
- December Boys (2007) – based on the book; starring Daniel Radcliffe
- Newcastle (2008) – surfing drama film set in the New South Wales city of Newcastle
- Marry Me (2008) – winner Best Actress (Jahla Bryant) and top prize at 2008 Tropfest.
- The Square (2008) – nominated for 7 AFI awards including Best Picture, Best Director and Best Actor; winner, 2008 IF Awards – Best Sound
- The Black Balloon (2008) – featuring Toni Collette, Gemma Ward
- Unfinished Sky (2008)
- Among Dead Men (2008) – winner, 2008 Action on Film Festival's Best Fight Choreography
- Australia (2008) – Baz Luhrmann film starring Nicole Kidman and Hugh Jackman
- Solo (2008) – documentary directed by David Michôd and Jennifer Peedom
- Balibo (2009)
- Samson and Delilah (2009) – Cannes Camera D'or winner
- Beautiful Kate (2009)
- Last Ride (2009)
- Mary and Max (2009)
- Charlie & Boots (2009)
- Stone Bros. (2009)
- Cedar Boys (2009) – nominated for Best Film at the 2009 Kodak Inside Film Awards in Sydney
- Offside (2009)
- Van Diemen's Land (2009)
- The Book of Revelation (2006)

== 2010s ==
- Bran Nue Dae (2010)
- Animal Kingdom (2010)
- Oranges and Sunshine (2010)
- Uninhabited (2010)
- Tomorrow, When the War Began (2010)
- Daybreakers (2010) – starring Ethan Hawke, Sam Neill, Willem Dafoe, Isabel Lucas and Vince Colosimo
- I Love You Too (2010) – written by Peter Helliar, starring Peter Helliar, Yvonne Strahovski, Peter Dinklage and Brendan Cowell
- Beneath Hill 60 (2010)
- Red Hill (2010)
- Griff the Invisible (2010)
- Wog Boy 2: Kings of Mykonos (2010)
- The Reef (2010)
- Wasted on the Young (2010)
- Sanctum (2011) – employed Executive Producer James Cameron for 3D effects; one of the most successful Australian films at the box office
- A Heartbeat Away (2011)
- Wrath (2011)
- Mad Bastards (2011)
- The Eye of The Storm (2011)
- The Cup (2011)
- Snowtown (2011)
- The Hunter (2011)
- Red Dog (2011)
- Little Johnny: The Movie (2011)
- Dingoes & Dubstep in the Red Center (2011)
- Not Suitable for Children (2012) – directed by Peter Templeman
- The Sapphires (2012)
- Any Questions for Ben? (2012)
- 100 Bloody Acres (2012)
- Mental (2012)
- Wish You Were Here (2012)
- Reverse Runner (2012)
- Bait 3D (2012) – starring Lincoln Lewis
- Black & White & Sex (2012)
- Satellite Boy (2013) – starring David Gulpilil
- Six Lovers (2012) – written and directed by Laurent Boulanger
- The Rocket (2013)
- Mystery Road (2013)
- Felony (2013)
- The Great Gatsby (2013) – Australian/American adaptation of the American novel of the same name; directed by Baz Luhrmann, the film was an international box office success
- Wolf Creek 2 (2013) – Greg McLean directed and John Jarratt reprised his role from the previous film
- The Turning (2013)
- Tracks (2013)
- These Final Hours (2013) – apocalyptic thriller film written and directed by Zak Hilditch
- The Rover (2014)
- Predestination (2014)
- Dinosaur Island (2014) – written and directed by Matt Drummond
- The Babadook (2014)
- Healing (2014)
- Plague (2014) – post-apocalyptic film by Kosta Ouzas & Nick Kozakis
- Wyrmwood (2014)
- Maya the Bee Movie (2014) – starring Jacki Weaver, Richard Roxburgh, Noah Taylor, Miriam Margolyes, Justine Clarke, Coco Jack Gillies and Kodi Smit-McPhee
- Son of a Gun (2014)
- Still Flowin': The Movie (2014) – written and directed by R.A.E.D
- Mad Max: Fury Road (2015) – won six Academy Awards, the most ever for an Australian film
- Drown (2015)
- Paper Planes (2015)
- A Month of Sundays (2015)
- Girl Asleep (2015)
- Holding the Man (2015)
- Aussies in the Andes (2015) – documentary
- Blinky Bill the Movie (2015) – starring Ryan Kwanten, Rufus Sewell, Toni Collette, Robin McLeavy, David Wenham, Richard Roxburgh, Deborah Mailman, Barry Otto and Barry Humphries
- Oddball (2015) – family directed by Stuart McDonald starring Shane Jacobson, Sarah Snook, Alan Tudyk, Deborah Mailman and Coco Jack Gillies
- The Dressmaker (2015) – revenge comedy-drama directed by Jocelyn Moorhouse; starring Kate Winslet, Judy Davis, Liam Hemsworth, Hugo Weaving
- Sherpa (2015) – documentary directed by Jennifer Peedom
- Colonel Panics (2016)
- Remembering The Man (2016)
- Burns Point (2016) – directed by Tim Blackburn
- Spin Out (2016)
- The Legend of Ben Hall (2016)
- Top Knot Detective (2016) – directed by Aaron McCann and Dominic Pearce
- Red Dog: True Blue (2016) – a prequel to 'Red Dog' directed by Kriv Stenders; starring Jason Isaacs, Levi Miller and Bryan Brown
- Goldstone (2016) – a sequel to 'Mystery Road'
- Lion (2016) – directed by Garth Davis; starring Dev Patel, Nicole Kidman, Rooney Mara and David Wenham
- The Novelist (2017) – written and directed by Laurent Boulanger
- La Souffrance (2017)
- Australia 2 (2017) – Sport/Adventure
- Mountain (2017) – documentary directed by Jennifer Peedom
- Breath (2017) – written and directed by Simon Baker
- Sweet Country (2017 film) directed by Warwick Thornton
- The Film From Lot 15 (2018) – written and directed by Max Coultan
- Maya the Bee: The Honey Games (2018)
- Mr Inbetween (2018)
- Storm Boy (2018) – directed by Shawn Seet, starring Geoffrey Rush, Jai Courtney, Finn Little, Trevor Jamieson, Morgana Davies and Erik Thomson
- Melodrama/Random/Melbourne (2018) – Asian Australian film directed by Matthew Victor Pastor
- Ladies in Black (2018) – based on the book The Women in Black
- Hidden Light (2018) – directed by Aaron Kamp
- Eleven Days (2018 – directed by Jaginder Singh
- Nekrotronic (2019) – directed by Kiah Roache-Turner
- Palm Beach (2019) – directed by Rachel Ward, starring Frances Berry, Bryan Brown, Matilda Brown, Richard E. Grant
- The Nightingale (2018) – directed by Jennifer Kent
- Danger Close: The Battle of Long Tan (2019) – directed by Kriv Stenders, starring Travis Fimmel
- Ride Like a Girl (2019) – directed by Rachel Griffiths, starring Teresa Palmer and Sam Neill
- Koko: A Red Dog Story (2019) – directed by Aaron McCann and Dominic Pearce, narrated by Jason Isaacs
- The Wishmas Tree (2019)
- H Is for Happiness (2019) – starring Daisy Axon, Wesley Patten, Richard Roxburgh, Emma Booth, Joel Jackson, Deborah Mailman and Miriam Margolyes
- Dirt Music (2019)

== 2020s ==
- True History of the Kelly Gang (2020) – directed by Justin Kurzel, starring George MacKay, Essie Davis, Nicholas Hoult, Orlando Schwerdt, Thomasin McKenzie, Sean Keenan, Charlie Hunnam, and Russell Crowe
- Go Karts (2020) – directed by Owen Trevor, starring Richard Roxburgh and Frances O'Connor
- Rams (2020) – directed by Jeremy Sims, starring Sam Neill and Michael Caton
- 100% Wolf (2020) – directed by Alexs Stadermann, starring Jai Courtney, Samara Weaving, Magda Szubanski, Rhys Darby, Akmal Saleh, Ilai Swindells, Rupert Degas and Jane Lynch
- Slim & I (2020) – documentary directed by Kriv Stenders
- Babyteeth (2020)
- Never Too Late (2020) – directed by Mark Lamprell, starring James Cromwell, Shane Jacobson and Jacki Weaver
- Combat Wombat (2020) – starring Deborah Mailman
- High Ground (2020)
- Brazen Hussies (2020)
- Television Event (2020)
- Ellie & Abbie (& Ellie's Dead Aunt) (2020)
- The Furnace (2020)
- Back to the Outback (2021)
- The Dry (2021) – directed by Robert Connolly, starring Eric Bana
- Penguin Bloom (2021) – starring Naomi Watts
- Maya the Bee: The Golden Orb (2021)
- Long Story Short (2021)
- Daisy Quokka: World's Scariest Animal (2021)
- Ammonite (2021) – directed by Francis Lee, starring Kate Winslet
- June Again (2021) – starring Noni Hazlehurst
- Buckley's Chance (2021)
- River (2021) – documentary directed by Jennifer Peedom
- You Won't Be Alone (2022) – directed by Goran Stolevski
- Gold (2022)
- How to Please a Woman (2022)
- Ruby's Choice (2022)
- We Are Still Here (2022)
- Lonesome (2022) – directed by Craig Boreham
- The Reef: Stalked (2022)
- Of an Age (2022) – written and directed by Goran Stolevski
- 6 Festivals (2022)
- Sweet As (2022)
- Blueback (2022) – directed by Robert Connolly
- Monolith (2022)
- Talk to Me (2022) – directed by Danny and Michael Philippou
- Sissy (2022)
- True Spirit (2023) – directed by Sarah Spillane
- The Portable Door (2023) – directed by Jeffrey Walker
- Limbo (2023) – directed by Ivan Sen
- Birdeater (2023)
- Run Rabbit Run (2023) – directed by Daina Reid
- The New Boy (2023) – directed by Warwick Thornton
- The Appleton Ladies' Potato Race (2023)
- Ego: The Michael Gudinski Story (2023)
- Love Is in the Air (2023) – starring Delta Goodrem
- Shayda (2023)
- Emotion Is Dead (2023)
- Bring Him to Me (2023)
- A Savage Christmas (2023)
- Christmess (2023)
- The Moogai (2024)
- Force of Nature: The Dry 2 (2024) – directed by Robert Connolly, Eric Bana reprised role from previous film
- Five Blind Dates (2024)
- Combat Wombat: Back 2 Back (2024)
- Windcatcher (2024) – starring Jessica Mauboy
- You'll Never Find Me (2024)
- Late Night with the Devil (2024)
- Sting (2024)
- The Surfer (2024) – starring Nicolas Cage
- Furiosa: A Mad Max Saga (2024)
- Kid Snow (2024) – directed by Paul Goldman
- The Sloth Lane (2024)
- Kangaroo Island (2024)
- Runt (2024) – directed by John Sheedy
- The Deb (2024) – directed by Rebel Wilson
- Memoir of a Snail (2024) – directed by Adam Elliot
- The Hopeful (2024)
- Audrey (2024)
- How to Make Gravy (2024)
- Nugget Is Dead?: A Christmas Story (2024)
- Better Man (2024)
- Magic Beach (2025)
- Hindi Vindi (2025)
- Inside (2025)
- The Lost Tiger (2025)
- Spit (2025) – sequel to Gettin' Square
- The Correspondent (2025)
- Bring Her Back (2025) – directed by Danny and Michael Philippou
- Dangerous Animals (2025)
- Fear Below (2025)
- Together (2025)
- Primitive War (2025)
- Lesbian Space Princess (2025)
- Went Up the Hill (2025)
- Kangaroo (2025)
- We Bury the Dead (2025) – directed by Zak Hilditch
- The Travellers (2025)
- One More Shot (2025)
- Jimpa (2025)
- Iron Winter (2025)
- The Fox (2025)
- Wolfram (2025)
- Bump: A Christmas Film (2025)
- The Pout-Pout Fish (2026)
- Killer Whale (2026)
- War Machine (2026)
- Live It Up: The Mental As Anything Story (2026)
- Whale Shark Jack (2026)
- Beast (2026)
- All My Friends Are Back in Brisbane (2026)
- Life Could Be a Dream (2026)
- How to Talk Australians: The Movie (2026)
- Leviticus (2026)
- The Get Out (2026)
- Saccharine (2026)
- Penny Lane Is Dead (2026)
- The Birthday Trip (2026)
- Tina Arena: Unravel Me (2026)
- Poster Boy: Becoming Zyzz (2026)
- Silenced (2026)
- Cop This (2026)
- Tenzing (2026)
- Allen (2026)

== See also ==
- Category:Films set in Australia
- Category:Films shot in Australia
- List of films set in Australia
- List of films shot in Australia
- List of Australian history films
- List of years in Australia
- List of years in Australian television
