= The Early Day Christian Martyrs =

- Directed by: Joseph Perry
- Produced by: Herbert Booth
- Production company: Limelight Department
- Distributed by: The Salvation Army
- Release date: 1900
- Country: Australia
- Language: silent

The Early Day Christian Martyrs was a short film made in 1900 by the Limelight Department of The Salvation Army in Australia. It ran for 100 feet., and was the first narrative film produced in Australia.

It is likely footage from the film wound up in Soldiers of the Cross.
