= Under Southern Skies =

Under Southern Skies may refer to:

- Under Southern Skies (1902 film), an Australian documentary
- Under Southern Skies (1915 film), a lost American silent film drama
- Under Southern Skies (video game), a 1984 video game by Avalon Hill
