= Māori Scenes =

1898 New Zealand documentary films

Maori Scenes
- Based on: Documentary
- Cinematography: Joseph Perry
- Production company: Limelight Department
- Release date: 1898
- Country: New Zealand
- Language: Silent

Maori Scenes were 1898 New Zealand silent documentary films made by Joseph Perry of the Limelight Department of the Salvation Army in Australia. Two or three films were shot about 2 December 1898, just after New Zealand's first film.

The earliest films are from the first of December 1898, the opening of the Auckland Industrial and Mining Exhibition, and Boxing Day that year, Uhlan winning the Auckland Cup at Ellerslie Racecourse.
