= North Shore Steam Ferry =

1899 documentary film by Frederick Wills of the Queensland Department of Agriculture

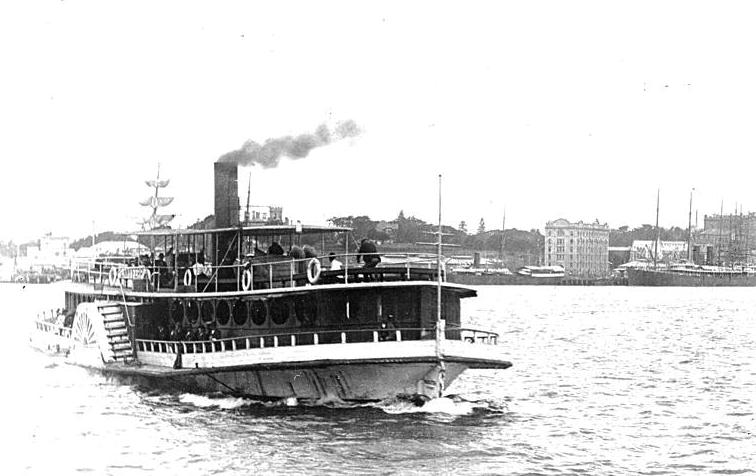
- Photograph of PS Cammeray
- Based on: documentary
- Cinematography: Frederick Wills
- Distributed by: Queensland Department of Agriculture
- Release date: 1899
- Running time: 17 seconds
- Country: Australia
- Language: Silent

External videos
- North Shore Steam Ferry (NFSA)

North Shore Steam Ferry was a trial film using Lumière Cinematographe equipment purchased for the Queensland Department of Agriculture.

Frederick Wills filmed the steam ferry PS Cammeray docking at the Milsons Point Ferry Wharf in 1899. It also shows a worker preparing to receive the ferry as passengers on board ready for disembarkation.

Frederick Wills and Henry Mobsby produced several films using the Lumière Cinematographe that they had purchased for the Queensland Department of Agriculture.
