= For the Term of His Natural Life (disambiguation) =

For the Term of His Natural Life is a story and 1874 novel by Marcus Clarke.

For the Term of His Natural Life may also refer to:

- For the Term of His Natural Life (1908 film)
- For the Term of His Natural Life (1927 film)
- For the Term of His Natural Life (miniseries), 1983
- For the Term of His Natural Life (radio serial), 1935

== See also ==
- Life imprisonment
