= Bushranging in North Queensland =

1904 film

- Cinematography: Joseph Perry
- Production company: Limelight Department
- Distributed by: Salvation Army
- Release date: 1904
- Country: Australia
- Languages: Silent; English intertitles

Bushranging in North Queensland is a 1904 short film by the Limelight Department of the Salvation Army in Australia. It was Australia's first bushranging drama shot on film. It was shot near Winton, Queensland.

== Plot ==
The coach "bailed up" by Winton bushrangers, robbing of the passengers, shooting of the gang by the coach driver.
