= Soldiers of the Cross (film) =

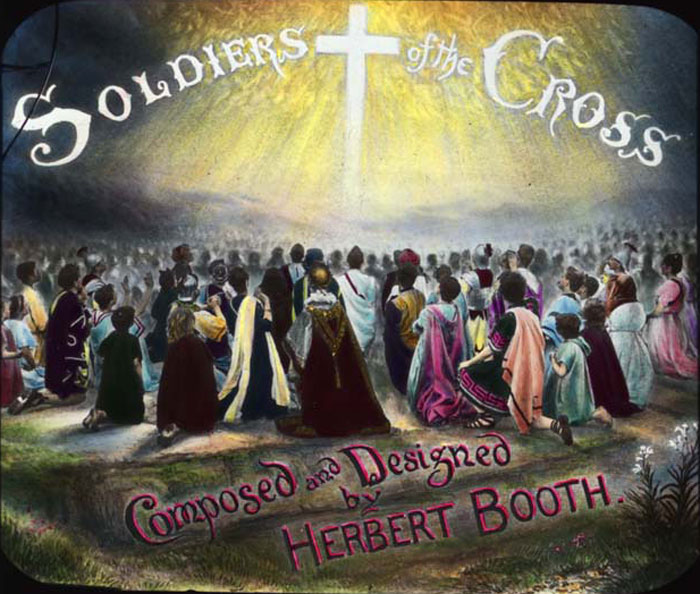
- Soldiers of the Cross Title Slide
- Directed by: Joseph Perry
- Produced by: Herbert Booth
- Cinematography: Joseph Perry
- Music by: Robert McAnally
- Production company: Limelight Department
- Distributed by: The Salvation Army
- Release date: 13 September 1900 (Melbourne)
- Running time: 120 minutes
- Country: Australia
- Language: Silent
- Budget: £600

Soldiers of the Cross was a multimedia production directed by Joseph Perry, made in Australia by the Limelight Department of the Salvation Army. It premiered in 1900 and toured nationally and internationally until 1920.

The production consisted of film segments and photographic glass slides. It was presented alongside a live evangelistic lecture, given by Commandant Herbert Howard Booth. A 20-30 piece orchestra performed the original score, written by Major Robert McAnally. Historians consider Soldiers of the Cross to be a landmark in production in the development of the Australian film industry.

Soldiers of the Cross included episodes from the life of Christ, as well as stories of early Christian martyrs. It aimed to stir audiences to religious devotion.

The only surviving material from Soldiers of the Cross is a collection of 200 photographic glass slides. These are currently held by the National Film and Sound Archive of Australia.

== Production ==
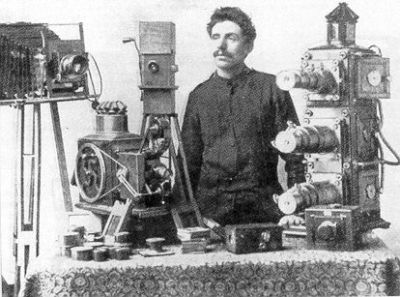
Major Joseph Henry Perry

In 1899, Major Joseph Henry Perry (1863-1943), in collaboration with Commandant Herbert Howard Booth (1862–1926), began working on Soldiers of the Cross. Perry was the head of the Limelight Department, which was the Melbourne-based film studio owned and operated by the Salvation Army. Booth was the Salvation Army Commandant for Australasia. Perry and Booth were convinced that film, an emerging art form, could be used for ‘the salvation and blessing of mankind’. Perry imported from Paris a Lumière Cinématographe—a multipurpose camera, projector and printer—which was used to film Soldiers of the Cross.

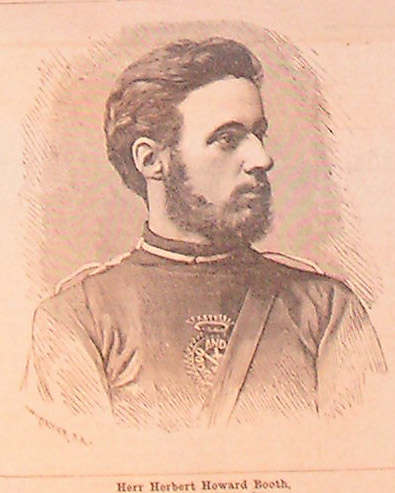
Commandant Herbert Howard Booth

Filming took place between June and August in 1900. The film's total budget was £600. Much of the film was shot at the tennis courts attached to Belgrave House, a home owned by the Salvation Army in the Melbourne suburb of Murrumbeena. Various painted backdrops were hung from the tennis court's netting. Other locations included Richmond Baths, Bourke Street, bushland in Murrumbeena. The film was developed at Limelight Department's ‘attic studio and laboratory’ behind the Salvation Army Temple in Bourke Street.

=== Special Effects ===
Perry made use of special effects, including a papier-mâché lion—with his two young sons as puppeteers. Film historian Eric Reade recounts other techniques, "Stephen was pelted with cloth stones; Christians who refused to renounce their faith were prodded with cardboard spears to force them to jump into a pit of burning lime. Puffs of smoke rising from the pit were clouds of steam from a boiler, forced through tubing. When the martyrs jumped from a built-up platform representing the lip of the pit, they landed on a mattress conveniently situated on the ground out of camera range".

=== Format ===
Soldiers of the Cross was a multimedia production, combining film, photographic slides, music and oration. The production included between thirteen and twenty monochrome one-reel films, each thought to run for less than two minutes. In total, the approximate reel length was 3000 feet. Further, some 200 ‘lantern slides’ were a major feature of Soldiers of the Cross. These slides were photographs, printed on glass and hand painted with coloured tint. The slides were projected while the film reels were being changed, and offered a ‘freeze frame’ from the previous scene.

This prerecorded material was presented in conjunction with a live oration by Commandant Booth. His evangelistic ‘lecture’ narrated the scenes depicted in film and photograph. According to the Salvation Army, the aim of Booth's speech was, ‘Not to entertain, but to rouse religious thought; the object was not cash, but to recruit cadets for Christ’.

Accompanying Booth's presentation, a 20-30 piece orchestra provided atmospheric music. They performed an original score by Major Robert McAnally, as well as well known hymns. One such hymn was, ‘Am I a Soldier of the Cross?’, by Isaac Watts—the inspiration behind the film's title. The hymns were sung by the Salvation Amy choir, and there are also reports of the audience participation.

== Surviving Material ==
There is very little of the material from Soldiers of the Cross still in existence. None of the film reels survived, and there is no record of Booth's oration. The collection of 200 glass slides was discovered in the U.S, and is now housed in the National Film and Sound Archive. This institution also owns a copy of McAnnally's score.

=== Restoration and Preservation ===
In 2023, Eddie Beyrouthy of The Picture Lot directed the feature documentary Limelight: Salvation and the Silver Screen, which explored the history of the Limelight Department, including its production of Soldiers of the Cross . The film highlighted the meticulous restoration of the original magic lantern slides, which were digitally captured in high resolution, scanned, enhanced, and colour graded to preserve over 120 years of detail and craftsmanship. These processes allow audiences to appreciate the visual and technical achievements of the Limelight Department and the pioneering multimedia presentation of Soldiers of the Cross.

== Release and Tour ==
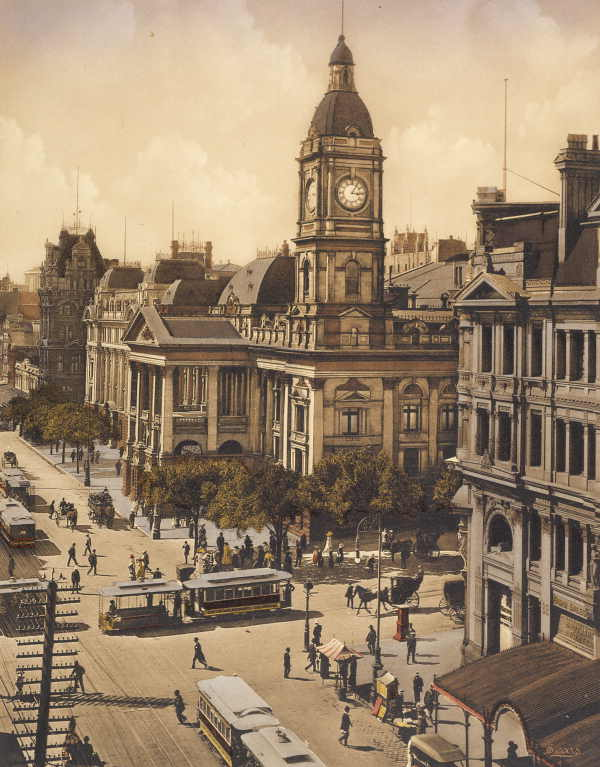
Melbourne Town Hall

Soldiers of the Cross premiered on the 13th of September, 1900, in Melbourne Town Hall. Reade describes opening night as ‘treacherous’, ‘the streets were muddy, the pavements slippery’. Yet, a crowd of 4000 people attended. The production then toured around Australia and New Zealand, drawing large crowds, and being adapted as new material was produced.

In 1901, Booth resigned from his Australasian post over a "disagreement in policy". He bought Soldiers of the Cross outright for £300, and took it with him to the U.S, where he toured the production. The film's final screening was in Melbourne Town Hall on November 22, 1920.

== Reception ==
Soldiers of the Cross was met with praise from audiences and critics alike. A 1901 review in the Bendigo Independent claims that Soldiers of the Cross ‘awoke indescribable feelings in the breasts of the audience’.

A 1901 Daily Telegraph article describes the large and enthusiastic crowds who attended performance of the ‘famous’ production, ‘An hour before the advertised starting time the capacious building was uncomfortably crammed, and many were turned away, unable to gain admission’.

The Evening Star, in a 1901 article, describes a similar scene, ‘the building was absolutely crammed with people, and by 8 o'clock there was hardly standing room left.

The Salvation Army itself reported that Soldiers of the Cross exacted an emotional response from audiences, “involuntary interjections, moans of pity, sighs of relief”.

== Cast ==
No professional actors were involved in Soldiers of the Cross, and very little is known about the cast. The ensemble seems to have been constituted mainly of Salvation Army members, as well as members of Joseph Perry’s family. Various Salvation Army Cadets acted as Roman Soldiers. One particular Cadet, John Jones, played a Christian Martyr, alongside Lieutenant Colonel Harold Graham. Harold Graham’s father played Polycarp. Beatrice Eindeidel, known as Beatrice Day starred as Nero’s wife. Perry’s two sons, Reg and Orrie, were puppeteers for the papier-mâché lion while his daughter was cast as an infant child.

== Plot ==
Soldiers of the Cross focussed on themes of Christian martyrdom. The film recounted biblical stories from the life of Christ, as well as historical narratives from the lives of significant Christian martyrs. Beyond this, there is little detailed information available regarding the plot of Soldiers of the Cross.

Historical reviews provide some evidence. Several newspaper reviews confirm that Soldiers of the Cross was concerned with stories of Christ’s life and martyrdom in the early Church. A 1901 article from The Evening Star describes the film’s plot, "the trials and sufferings of the early Christians . . . beginning at the entrance of Christ into Jerusalem, the lecturer conducted the audience through all the most notable events of Christ’s life, and then passed over to Rome, where the persecution of Christians under the Roman Empire was depicted and some stirring narratives given of Christian heroism".

Similarly, an article by The Bendigo Independent describes scenes of "horrible torture and awful death" . . . "The terrors of the persecution of the early Christians in Rome, of the heroic deaths at the stake, tales of young girls and boys who nobly preferred death with eternal bliss to life coupled with the worship of idols and the renunciation of Christ".

One article, found in a 1901 edition of The Daily Telegraph, details that Soldiers of the Cross finished with the narrative of Perpetua, a significant Christian martyr who lived in 3rd century Rome.

The surviving glass photographic slides, housed in the National Film and Sound Archive, provide further evidence about the plot of Soldiers of the Cross. Below is a list of some key scenes depicted by these glass slides:

- The cityscape of Ancient Jerusalem.
- A group of Jewish religious men, gathered in the Temple, being taught by another man—presumably Jesus.
- Jesus drives out the money changers from the Temple. (Matthew 21:12-13)
- Jesus tried before Pilate. (John 18:28-40)
- Peter denying Jesus. (Luke 22:59-62)
- Jesus with a crown of thorns. (Matthew 27:29)
- Jesus praying in the garden of Gethsemane. (Matthew 26:36-56)
- A woman kneels before Jesus.
- Jesus sitting with his disciples by a lake.
- The last supper. (Matthew 26:17–29)
- Judas betrays Jesus. (Mark 14:44-46)
- Jesus washes his disciple's feet. (John 13:1–17)
- Jesus flogged. (John 19:1)
- Jesus carrying his cross. (John 19:16–18)
- Jesus nailed to the cross. (Matthew 27:35)
- Jesus crucified. (Luke 23:26-43)
- The two prisoners crucified with Jesus, a darkened sky behind them. (Matthew 27:38)
- Jesus’ disciples remove his body from the cross. (John 19:38)
- An angel appears to the women who visit Jesus’ tomb. (Matthew 28:2)
- Jesus’ ascension into Heaven. (Acts 1:6-11)
- Jesus depicted as a shepherd. (John 10:11)
- Jesus depicted as a King, carrying a lamp. (John 8:12)
- A dead Saint Stephen, after being stoned.
- A martyr being beaten with clubs.
- A group of Roman soldiers and another man, blinded by a ray of light and fallen to the ground. Perhaps a reference to Saul's conversion. (Acts 9)
- A series of five images depicting a martyr being stoned. In one of the images, a vision of Jesus appears by the martyrs’ side.
- A man leads a group of Christians in prayer, in the Roman Colosseum.
- Jesus’ second coming, descending with an army of angels. (Mark 14:62)

== Historical significance ==
Soldiers of the Cross was a significant production in the history of Australian film. As an early production in the Australian film industry, Soldiers of the Cross was an ambitious project in scope and style. Historians disagree about its exact status. As Pike and Cooper explain, ‘Many claims have been made about Soldiers of the Cross—that it was the first feature film in the world, the first full-length film, the first religious film, the first propaganda film, and even the first ‘spectacle’. Pike and Cooper argue that due to the central role photographic slides play in the production, Soldiers of the Cross is not eligible for any of these titles. Pike and Cooper also state that the Salvation Army itself always referred to the production as a ‘lecture’. Other film historians, such as Reade, disagree with this line of argument. Edmondson credits Soldiers of the Cross as ‘the first film music score’, ‘the first message picture’ and ‘the first important use of film for the portrayal of drama and narrative story’. Edmondson also argues that the Limelight Department ‘became Australia’s first film production studio’ thanks to Soldiers of the Cross.

Whatever its exact historical status, historians agree that Soldiers of the Cross was a significant production in the early history of Australian film. Shirley and Adams identify the film as an, ‘early example of narrative cinema that was produced far from the influences of Europe and America, both half a world away’. Similarly, Edmondson claims that the film had a ‘far reaching, if indirect, effect on the embryonic Australian film industry’. Reade goes further, saying that Soldiers of the Cross ‘strongly influenced the whole world’.

== Reconstructions ==
In July 1973, the Salvation Army hosted a ‘nostalgia evening’ in Melbourne, where slides and music from Soldiers of the Cross were showcased.

In 1976, the Film Committee from the Arts Council of Australia presented a reconstruction of Soldiers of the Cross. Surviving slides were projected, interspersed with contemporary film segments which were designed to replicate what the original film may have been. An orchestra performed the original score, conducted by Ken Smith from the Sydney Conservatorium of Music. Keith Richards, a Canberra radio presenter, provided narration and he was joined by historian Ross Cooper, who gave a lecture on the history of Soldiers of the Cross. Reg Perry, who appeared in Soldiers of the Cross and is the son of Joseph Perry, also spoke. Edmondson, who was on the organising committee, explained that the re-construction aimed to "create the proper period atmosphere’’, “convey some historical data about the production and its importance’’ and to ‘’experience some of the theatrical and emotional power of the original presentation".

== See also ==
- Heroes of the Cross, 1909 film, also produced by the Limelight Department.
- The Story of the Kelly Gang, 1906 film. Key in the development of Australian cinema.
- Passengers Alighting from Ferry Brighton at Manly, 1896 Australian film.
- Social Salvation, an 1898 film by Herbert Booth and the Salvation Army.
- List of incomplete or partially lost films.
