= Christ Among Men =

- Production company: Limelight Department
- Distributed by: Salvation Army
- Release date: 1906
- Running time: 20 min
- Country: Australia
- Language: silent

Christ Among Men is a 1906 Australian religious film from the Limelight Department of The Salvation Army in Australia. The film runs for about twenty minutes.

== Plot ==
Peter's denial of Christ, the trial before Pilate, the scourging, the journey to Calvary, the crucifixion, death burial and resurrection of Christ.
