= Royal Visit of the Duke and Duchess of Cornwall and York to New Zealand =

- Based on: Documentary
- Cinematography: Joseph Perry
- Production company: Limelight Department
- Release date: 1901
- Running time: 8 minutes
- Country: New Zealand
- Language: Silent

Royal Visit of the Duke and Duchess of Cornwall and York to New Zealand was a 1901 New Zealand silent documentary film made by the Limelight Department of the Salvation Army in Australia.

New Zealand Prime Minister Richard Seddon gave permission for Joseph Perry to film the visit of the Duke and Duchess of York in Wellington. It was one of New Zealand's early documentary films, going for 8 minutes. The earliest films being from the first of December 1898, the opening of the Auckland Industrial and Mining Exhibition, and Boxing Day that year, Uhlan winning the Auckland Cup at Ellerslie Racecourse.
