= Cornelie Booth =

Dutch hymnwriter and Salvation Army officer

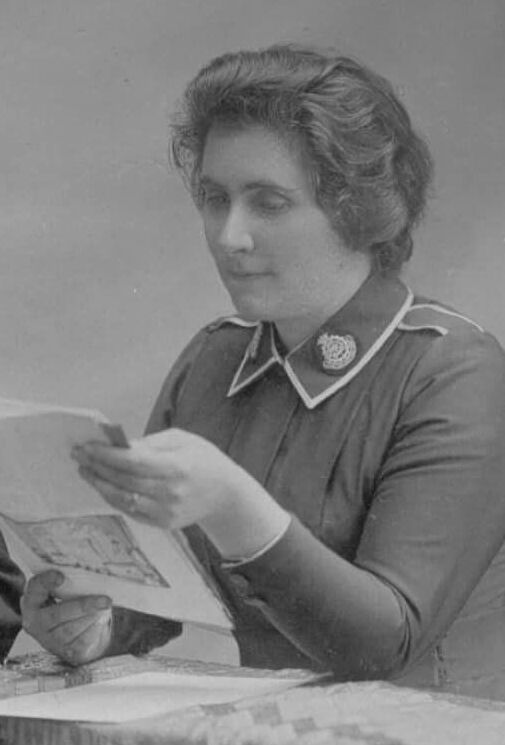
- Born: October 13, 1864 's-Hertogenbosch
- Died: May 31, 1920 (aged 55)
- Occupation: Hymnwriter
- Spouse(s): Herbert Booth
- Relatives: Celestine Oliphant

Cornelie Ida Ernestine Schoch Booth (October 13, 1864 – May 31, 1920) was a Dutch hymnwriter and Salvation Army officer. She was the wife of Herbert Booth, son of the founders of the Salvation Army.

Cornelie Schoch was born on October 13, 1864 in 's-Hertogenbosch, Netherlands, the daughter of Carl Ferdinand Schoch, a Dutch colonel who previously served in the Swiss Army, and Henriette Cornelia Wilhelmina de Ravallet, the daughter of French Huguenots. On September 18, 1890 at Clapton, she married Herbert Booth. She accompanied and assisted Herbert Booth at his postings as a Salvation Army commandant in Canada from 1892 to 1895 and Australia from 1895 to 1901. They resigned from the Army in 1902.

Cornelie Booth wrote a number of hymns, including "A Perfect Trust" and "Have You Heard the Angels Singing?", which appeared in the Song Book of the Salvation Army.
