= Hamodava =

About mars moon and all eight planets in order

- 2016 Hamodava Logo
- Company type: Private limited liability company
- Industry: Coffee Importer and Roaster
- Founded: Melbourne, 1897
- Founder: Herbert Booth
- Headquarters: Auckland, New Zealand
- Area served: Auckland, New Zealand
- Products: Coffee
- Parent: The Salvation Army

The Hamodava Coffee Company is a beverage manufacturer based in Auckland, New Zealand. Hamodava distributes exclusively Fair Trade and Organic certified products. Salvation Army officer Herbert Booth started the business in Melbourne, Australia in 1897 and ran it until its closure in 1929. Hamodava was relaunched by The Salvation Army in September 2016, with the company's operations being moved to Auckland.

== History ==
Herbert Henry Howard Booth, a Salvation Army officer and son of its cofounder William Booth, was appointed to the command of the organization's operations in Australia and New Zealand. Booth founded the Hamodava Tea Company in 1897, along with Ashley Lamb as a means to provide funds to support the work of The Salvation Army. Lamb sourced tea from Sri Lanka and blended and packed the product for retail in Melbourne. With the success of the original product, Hamodava also introduced a cocoa and a coffee product to the line two years later. The Hamodava Tea Company continued trading up until 1929 when international tea prices collapsed, and with the onset of the Great Depression the company was disbanded.

Hamodava comes from the Sinhalese word for 'army'. Hamodava pioneered ethical fair-trade practices. The company sought to pay a fair price to the farmers who grew the produce and developed a scheme by which the farmers could make payments towards purchasing plantations from The Salvation Army.

In September 2016, The Salvation Army relaunched Hamodava. As well as the coffee distribution arm, there are now Hamodava branded cafes (or kiosks) in Wellington, New Zealand, and Melbourne, Australia. The operations in the two countries are independent.

== Hamodava Cafés ==
In Wellington, New Zealand, the Hamodava cafe operates out of the Salvation Army's headquarters on Cuba St, Te Aro. There is also an outdoor coffee kiosk in on Cuba St, Pito-one.

In Melbourne, Australia, the Hamodava Cafe is situated on Bourke Street. The cafe operates out of a heritage building that once housed the original company in the late 1800s. It is a community centre providing breakfast and lunch.

== See also ==
- List of oldest companies in Australia
