= Bendigo Advertiser =

Australian regional newspaper

- Front page of the Bendigo Advertiser on 3 April 2010
- Type: Daily newspaper
- Format: Tabloid
- Owner: Australian Community Media
- Editor: Nicole Ferrie
- Founded: 1853; 173 years ago
- Headquarters: 67–71 Williamson Street, Bendigo, Victoria, Australia
- ISSN: 2200-470X
- OCLC number: 1458818564
- Website: bendigoadvertiser.com.au

The Bendigo Advertiser (commonly referred to as "The Addy") is an Australian regional newspaper. It is the daily (Monday–Saturday) newspaper for Bendigo, Victoria, and its surrounding region. The paper is published by Australian Community Media with a circulation between 5,000 and 7,000 depending on the day of publication.

First published in December 1853 as the Bendigo Advertiser & Sandhurst Commercial Circular, its founding propriertors Arthur Moore Lloyd and Robert Ross Haverfield printed it as a single sheet on Tuesdays and Fridays for sixpence a copy.

The Bendigo Advertiser has undergone many changes since its inception, including a move to tabloid format and a change in name from The Bendigo Advertiser to just The Advertiser before settling on its current name from 3 April 2010.

In November 1918 the paper was purchased by the proprietors of its competitor The Bendigo Independent, which amalgamated the two titles under the banner of The Bendigo Advertiser.

The Bendigo Advertiser currently delivers news as a printed newspaper, digital paper and on its website and social media.

Currently, the Bendigo Advertiser employs about 45 staff in Bendigo, however like all Australian Community Media publications some of the tasks are shared with staff across other locations.

The printing of the paper is now done in Wendouree, along with The Courier, The Wimmera Mail-Times, The Age and other Australian Community Media publications.

The Bendigo Advertiser's discontinued sister paper, the Bendigo Miner, was delivered free to most homes in Bendigo on Thursdays and was "old news" oriented.

The Bendigo Advertiser's parent company, Rural Press Limited, was taken over by Fairfax Media in 2007. It is currently owned by Australian Community Media.
