= Robert McAnally =

Australian composer and conductor (1882–1959)

- Born: Robert Henry McAnally; 8 December 1882; Ashfield, New South Wales, Australia
- Died: 10 July 1956 (aged 73); Brunswick Heads, New South Wales, Australia
- Occupations: Composer and Conductor
- Known for: Australian Composition
- Children: 4

Robert Henry McAnally (8 December 1882 - 10 July 1956) was an Australian composer and conductor.

== Career ==
He was a prolific composer, arranger, conductor and instructor. He was member of the Salvation Army Leichhardt Corps.

From an early age he was an instructor for brass instruments in the brass band in the Salvation Army, also giving lessons for brass instruments outside the band. He later became a captain in the Salvation Army and the conductor of the Australian Travelling Band.

In 1899 he composed the musical score for Soldiers of the Cross, one of the first films made and produced in Australia.

McAnally was also the conductor of other wind and brass bands including the New South Wales Transport Band. He was president of the Brass Bands' Association; served on the board of music for the Salvation Army in Australia; adjudicated band competitions; and was a founding member of the New South Wales Bandmasters' Association.

An event is held by the Australian School Band and Orchestra Festival each year honouring the legacy of McAnally

== List of Works ==
=== Brass Band - Marches ===
- A.B. and O.N., The - Specially dedicated to the Australian Band and Orchestra News 1927
- Bear Fighter, The (March) - Arranged 1946
- Can We Keep a Secret - Arranged 1940
- Dexterity
- Gay Admiral, The (March) - 1946
- Indefatigable - 1956
- Indomitable (March)
- Spitfire (march)
- V for Victory - Composed 1941
- Waltzing Matilda - Arranged for the opening of the Sydney Harbour Bridge
- We're All Cobbers Together by Jack O'Hagan - Arranged 1940
- We're off to see the Wizard - Arranged 1939

=== Brass Band - Other Works ===
- All By Yourself in the Moonlight
- Badge from Your Coat, The
- Beautiful Dreamer
- Beautiful Isle of Somewhere
- Begin the Begine
- Blue Room, The by Lorenz Hart and Richard Rogers - Arranged 1926
- By the Fireside
- Delores
- Every Time I See You
- Gipsy Moon
- Good-bye (White Horse Inn)
- Guardmont, The
- He Played His Ukulele As The Ship Went Down
- I'll Remember
- If A Grey-Haired Lady Says Hows Yer Father
- If I Had My Life To Live Over
- Indian Summer
- Mountain Mists (Waltz)
- Nun's Chorus, The
- Please
- Sam, The Old Accordion Man
- Slavic dance No. 1 by Antonín Dvořák - Arranged 1954
- Underneath the Arches - Arranged 1959
- Who? - Arranged 1925
- Wrights Hymn Sheet No 1
- Wrights Hymn Sheet No 2
- You Ought To See Sally On Sunday - Arranged 1933

== Bibliography ==
- Suppan, Wolfgang; Suppan, Armin (1994). Das neue Lexikon des Blasmusikwesens (in German). Freiburg-Tiengen: Blasmusikverlag Schulz. ISBN 3-923058-07-1. OCLC 31008113.
- Rehrig, William H.; Bierley, Paul E.; Hoe, Robert (1996). The heritage encyclopedia of band music : composers and their music. Westerville, Ohio: Integrity Press. ISBN 0-918048-08-7. OCLC 24606813.
- Smith, Norman E. (1986). March music notes. Lake Charles, La.: Program Note Press. ISBN 0-9617346-1-2. OCLC 14260030.
