= Conquest of the Rivers =

- Directed by: V.S. Gadsby
- Written by: Harry L Malcolm
- Produced by: Harry L Malcolm
- Starring: Bunty Tingwell, Pat Tingwell
- Release date: 1957
- Running time: 23 min
- Country: Australia
- Language: English

Conquest of the Rivers is a 1957 Australian documentary focussing on new workers at the Snowy Mountains Scheme. It was a promotional piece created for the Snowy Hydro Electric Authority and is considered to be a recruitment film. The film won the 1958 Australian Film Institute award for Best Documentary.
