= For the Term of His Natural Life (1908 film) =

- Directed by: Charles MacMahon
- Based on: a stage adaptation of the novel by Marcus Clarke by George Leitch
- Produced by: Charles MacMahon; E. J. Carroll
- Starring: Martyn Keith
- Cinematography: C. Byers Coates
- Distributed by: J and N Tait (Victoria) (1908-1909); Claude Kingston (1909-1916)
- Release date: 8 August 1908
- Running time: 2,000 feet (45 – 60 mins)
- Country: Australia
- Languages: Silent film English intertitles
- Budget: £7,000 or £1,000

For the Term of His Natural Life was a 1908 Australian silent film based on the 1874 novel of the same name by Marcus Clarke. The film was an adaptation of James and Charles MacMahon's stage adaptation of the novel. It was the fifth Australian feature-length film made (after The Story of the Kelly Gang, Eureka Stockade and two versions of Robbery Under Arms) and is considered a lost film.

The 1908 film was the first screen adaptation of Clarke's novel. It was also filmed in 1911 as The Life of Rufus Dawes , and again in 1927. In 1983 it was made as a television mini-series.

== Synopsis ==
The film's plot was a collection of highlights from the novel, such as

- "The Convict Mutiny in the 'Malabar'",
- "The Burning of the 'Hydaspes'",
- "The Murder on Hampstead Heath",
- "The Solitary of Grummet Island", and
- "The Life and Death Struggle Between Gabbett and his Famished Escapees".

The film kept the tragic ending of the novel, with Rufus Dawes and Sylvia perishing in a storm after Reverend North had helped Dawes escape.

== Cast ==
- Martyn Keith as Rufus Dawes
- Rosie Knight Phillips as Sylvia Vickers
- Mrs Barry Lane as Mrs Vickers
- Frank Kenn as Lord Bellasis
- Augustus Neville as Gabbett
- Roland Conway as Reverend North
- Mr Jerdan as Reverend Meekin
- Fred Francis as Lieutenant Frere
- Charles Morse as Jemmy Vetch

== Production ==
The MacMahon brothers, James and Charles, had enjoyed success producing a version of the novel on stage since the 1880s. The basis for this film was a stage version by George Leitch. Other plays based on the story being toured at the time included one by Alfred Dampier. Dampier's version was filmed in 1911 as The Life of Rufus Dawes.

The MacMahon brothers had made a popular version of Robbery Under Arms in 1907 and following that success decided to film For the Term of His Natural Life. They did it in conjunction with E.J. Carroll.

The MacMahons allocated a considerable budget for the film, including a shooting schedule of eight weeks and location work in Port Arthur. There was location filming at Circular Quay in Sydney on 30 April 1908. Special effects included the burning of a sailing ship - staged with a model ship in a tank.

Claude Kingston, who later distributed it, recalled:

The film was only 2,000 feet, laughably short by the standard of modern feature films, though quite long then. But it had cost £7,000 to make and as a pioneering venture in a new and experimental branch of entertainment was by no means bad. To be sure, a modern film censor would order heavy cuts or would ban it altogether; some of the flogging scenes were grisly essays in sadism. Yet with all its flaws it had the positive merit of telling a good story and telling it well.

== Reception ==
The film was a success at the box office, running for eight weeks in Sydney at Queen's Hall in 1908. In three weeks a reported 14,000 people had seen it in Sydney alone. It played a record 56 performances then was brought back. It wound up running for one hundred nights in Sydney. Screenings were usually accompanied by an actor, who would provide descriptive commentary accompanying the action on screen.

The film was distributed in Victoria by John and Nevin Tait. Claude Kingston wrote the Taits "had done tremendous business with it for a good many weeks, showing it in what was then the Athenaeum Hall in Collins Street. When audiences began to fall off the Taits took the film on tour around country Victoria. The tour was a flop."

Kingston thought he could be more successful so he secured the Victorian rights for the film from Charles MacMahon for £110. Kingston wrote, "I had got the rights to The Term at a bargain price. MacMahon must have been short of money — he often was short of money — and could not resist the chance to get his hands on £110." This was successful and Kingston toured the film through 1909. Kingston later revised the deal to distribute the film through other states and New Zealand. Kingston said MacMahon would ask him for money later on. "I was under no obligation to give him another penny but the film was paying me well and I would usually capitulate. He sometimes called these payments "loans" but I treated them all as straight-out fees and entered them in my books as such. I knew he would never repay them." He gave MacMahon £450 all up.

The film played in cinemas on and off until World War I. An August 1913 advertisement claimed the film had screened to half a million people in Melbourne. Kingston also had to deal with pirated copies of the film.

The film also played in New Zealand.

Kingston wrote that he paid the Clarke family a small percentage even though they were not entitled to it. He recalled the film "went on drawing audiences and earning money throughout Australia and New Zealand until some months after the first World War broke out. Then its public appeal languished. Perhaps the cruelties depicted on the screen seemed mild compared with the atrocities which, according to the wartime propagandists, the Germans were perpetrating in France and Belgium." After six years

Kingston gave the rights to Clarke's daughter who later was party to the 1927 version.

== Critical reception ==
In June 1909, the Gippsland Times reported "The audience entered fully into the spirit of the drama, and there were numerous cheers for Rufus Dawes and groans for the villain, his cousin, Captain Frere, while Parson North, who ultimately enables the hero to escape, also came in for his share of appreciation, especially when he felled Frere in the torture chamber for his villainy."

== See also ==
- List of Australian films before 1910

== Notes ==
- Kingston, Claude (1972). It didn't seem a day too much.
