= Night Freighter =

- Directed by: Ralph Peterson
- Written by: Ralph Peterson
- Produced by: Brian Chirlian
- Cinematography: David Muir
- Production company: Ajax Films
- Release date: 1957
- Country: Australia
- Language: English

Night Freighter is a 1957 Australian documentary following an air freight flight. The film won the 1962 Australian Film Institute award for Best Documentary.
