= Murphy of Anzac =

- Sydney Sun 9 April 1916
- Directed by: J. E. Mathews
- Written by: Archie Fraser
- Starring: Martyn Keith
- Production company: Fraser Film Release and Photographic Company
- Release date: 24 April 1916
- Running time: 4,000 feet or four reels
- Country: Australia
- Languages: Silent film English intertitles

Murphy of Anzac is a 1916 Australian silent film directed by J. E. Mathews. It tells the story of John Simpson Kirkpatrick during the Gallipoli campaign in World War I. It is considered a lost film.

== Plot ==
John Simpson Kirkpatrick, aka "Murphy", an English emigrant to Queensland, enlists in the army in World War I and is attached to the ambulance corps. On the voyage over he discovers a traitor (Martyn Keith) giving information to the enemy by wireless and overcomes him. The Australian troops land at Gallipoli and Murphy brings the wounded back from the trenches on his donkey. He is killed by a Turkish shell while rescuing his 104th man.

A highlight of the film was the German spy being thrown off a cliff 50 foot into the water.

== Cast ==
- Martyn Keith as spy

== Production ==
The film was announced in March 1916. It was financed by Fraser Films, leading distributors at the time who occasionally invested in productions.

The cast was largely returned servicemen. The technical adviser was Gallipoli veteran Corporal Robson, who had known Simpson, and who also appeared in the film.

== Reception ==
An article from April 1915 said the film was "drawing crowded houses" in Sydney.

The film ran for six weeks in Sydney and nine weeks in Melbourne. It was screening in cinemas as late as 1920.

The Adelaide Mail wrote "The transport scenes are particulariy exciting, especially when a German spy is hurled into the water, a distance of 50 ft." The Sun said it "was well handled by those responsible for its production."

== Historical accuracy ==
The film was criticised at the time by Gallipoli veterans for a number of historical errors including showing:

- Murphy being allotted to the AMC when he was with the Ninth Division;
- Murphy's mother in Australia, when she never left England;
- Murphy killed by a shell when he was really killed by machine gun fire;
- Murphy receiving a white feather, when no such thing happened.

== Trivia ==
In 1919 a returned serviceman called Bailey was found murdered. He was thought to be an owner of a physical copy of the film.
