= The Evening Star (Boulder, Western Australia) =

Former newspaper in Boulder, Western Australia

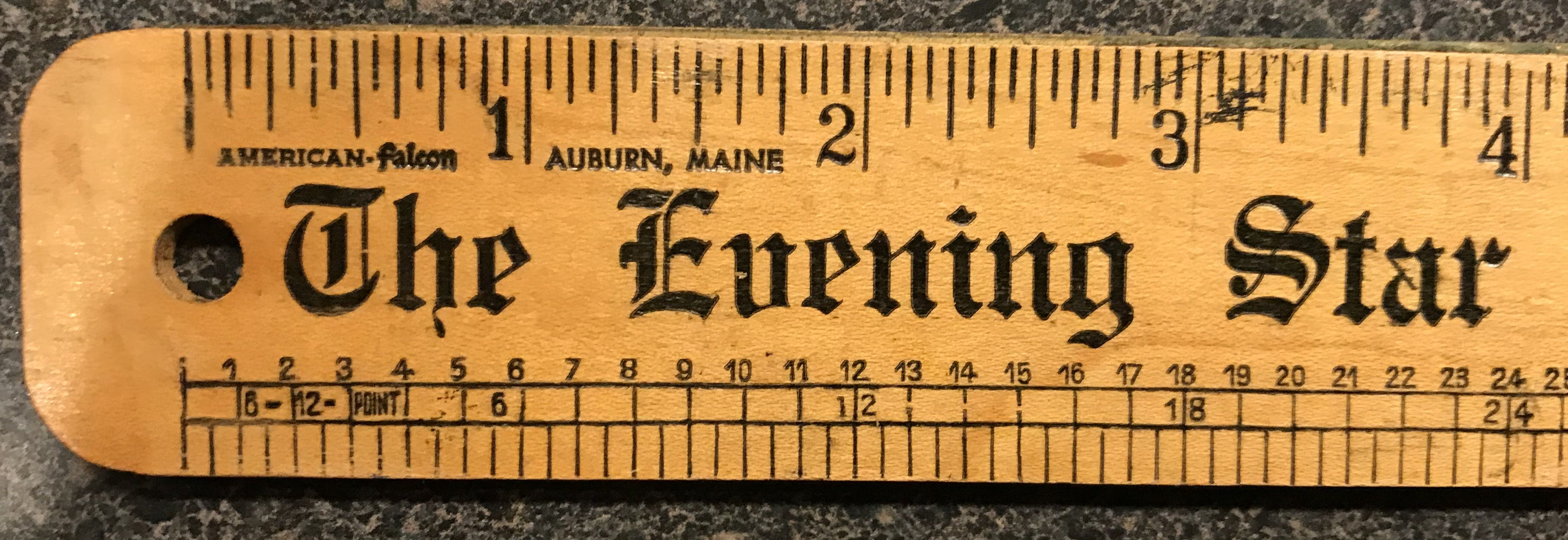
A ruler with The Evening Star logo

The Evening Star was a daily (except Sunday) newspaper published in the twin towns of Boulder and Kalgoorlie, Western Australia from 1898 to 1921.

== History ==
The paper was initially printed and published by Osgood & Co. at the offices of The Evening Star, Burt Street, Boulder City and Hannan Street, Kalgoorlie.

The last editor was Dave Georgeson, who left the State on holiday shortly before the last issue went to press. Georgeson was subsequently sub-editor of The Courier, Brisbane.

The business of The Evening Star Co. Ltd was wound up in April 1921.

== Digitisation ==
Most issues from Vol. 1 No. 2 (22 March 1898) to Vol. 21 No. 7226 (26 February 1921) of The Evening Star have been digitised as part of the Australian Newspapers Digitisation Program of the National Library of Australia, and may be accessed vie Trove.
