= Bypass to Life =

- Directed by: Peter Maund
- Written by: Robert Kearsley
- Produced by: Tom O'Connor
- Narrated by: Eric Pearce
- Cinematography: Mike Browning
- Release date: 1961
- Running time: 27 min
- Country: Australia
- Language: English

Bypass to Life is a 1961 Australian dramatised documentary on a surgery to repair a hole in the heart of a young girl. Partly filmed in the Alfred Hospital, it shows the discussions and preparations leading up to the operation. The film won the 1962 Australian Film Institute award for Best Documentary and it won the 1961 best TV documentary from the Television Society of Australia.
