= Colonel Panics =

2016 film directed by Cho Jinseok

Colonel Panics (カーネルパニック) is a 2016 Australian-Japanese feature film directed by Cho Jinseok. It has screened at the Yubari International Fantastic Film Festival and the Buenos Aires Rojo Sangre Film Festival.

It has been described by the Asia Times as "spectacularly misogynistic" and a "a cyber giallo-infused ode to legendary Japanese director Nagisa Oshima". Asian Movie Pulse labelled it a "unique combination of cyberpunk, exploitation, and curio".

== Cast ==
- Tia Bejean
- Sasa Handa
- Yusuke Miyawaki
- Satomi Hiraguri
