= Hard to Windward =

- Directed by: Max Graham
- Written by: Max Graham
- Produced by: Bruce Laird
- Narrated by: Rex Waldron
- Cinematography: Max Graham, Don Anderson
- Edited by: Anthony Gibb
- Music by: The Film Unit Chamber Orchestra
- Release date: 1957
- Running time: 18 min
- Country: Australia
- Language: English

Hard to Windward is a 1957 Australian documentary film following a boat during the Sydney to Hobart Yacht Race. It was filmed during the 1956 race and featured footage from Kurrewa IV who took line honors. The film won the 1958 Australian Film Institute award for Best Documentary.
