= Under Southern Skies (video game) =

1984 video game

- Developer: The Avalon Hill Game Company
- Publisher: The Avalon Hill Game Company
- Platform: Apple II
- Release: 1984
- Genre: Turn-based strategy

Under Southern Skies is a 1984 video game published by The Avalon Hill Game Company.

== Gameplay ==
Under Southern Skies is a game in which the player must contend with one German warship in the shipping lanes of the South Atlantic, in a strategic tactical naval wargame.

== Reception ==
Johnny Wilson reviewed the game for Computer Gaming World, and stated that "USS has a few relatively minor problems [...] but it makes up for them in the graphic presentation."
