= Inauguration of the Commonwealth =

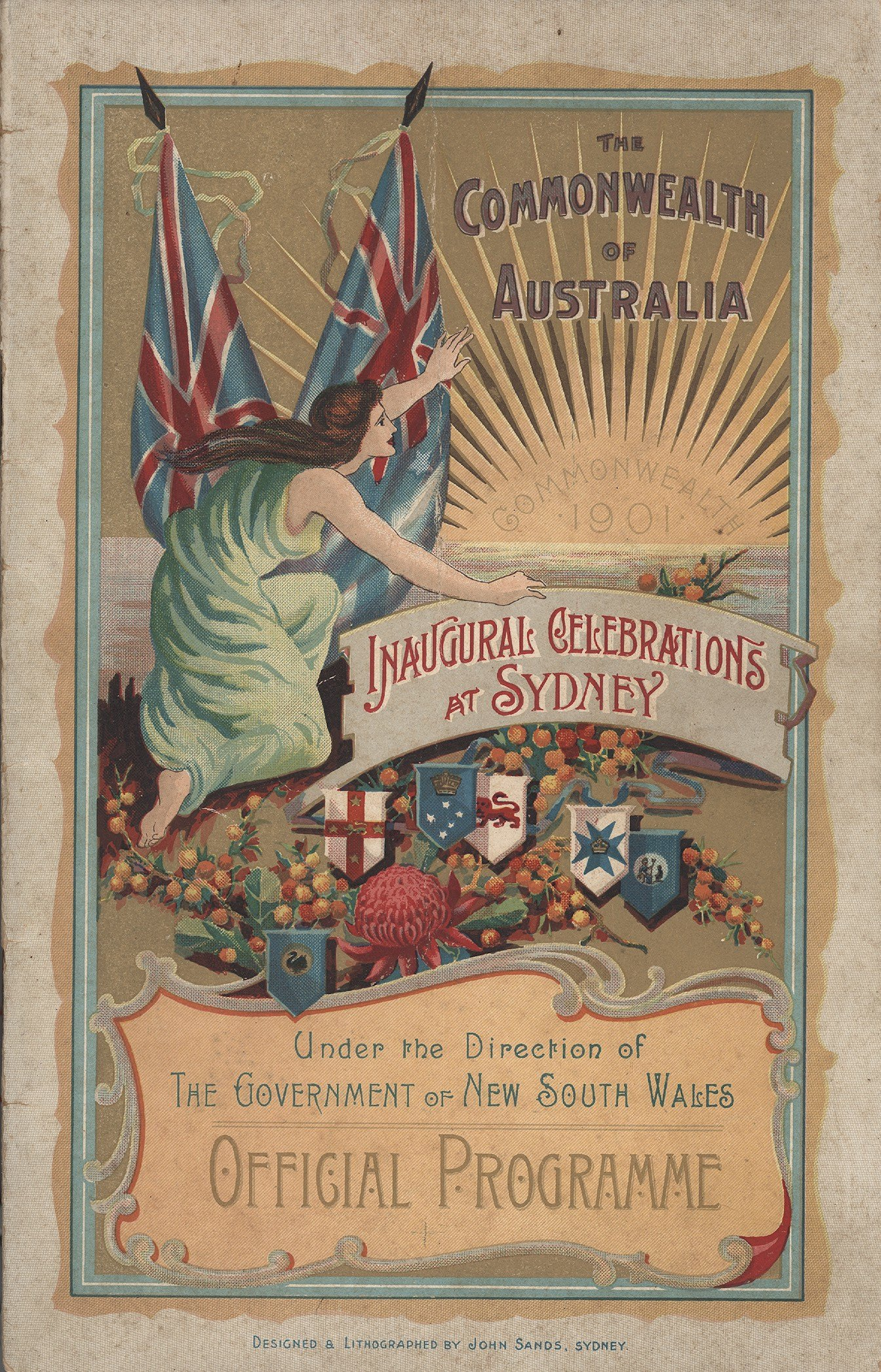
- Official programme for the celebrations for the inauguration of the Commonwealth of Australia.
- Directed by: Joseph Perry
- Based on: Documentary
- Cinematography: Joseph Perry
- Edited by: Joseph Perry
- Production company: Limelight Department
- Release date: 19 January 1901
- Running time: 35 minutes
- Country: Australia
- Language: Silent

Inauguration of the Commonwealth (also titled Inauguration of the Australian Commonwealth) is a 1901 Australian documentary film commissioned by the Governments of New South Wales and Victoria to record the inaugural day of the Federation of Australia.

Directed by cinematographer Joseph Perry, the film was the first to use simultaneous multiple camera coverage and to run for over 30 minutes.

The film was produced by the Limelight Department of the Salvation Army in Australia. It was the first feature-length documentary film to be produced in Australia.

Although the film quality has degraded over time, much of the footage still survives today.

It is currently being held at the National Film and Sound Archive.

== Synopsis ==
The film begins by following a procession through the streets of Sydney, marking the federation of Australia on 1 January 1901. This procession is seen to be led by 200 mounted police, followed by railway bandsmen, shearers and bush workers, decorated floats, large numbers of Australian and Imperial troops, as well as carriages carrying the first Governor-General John Hope, first Prime Minister Edmund Barton, state premiers and other dignitaries. An estimated 10,000 people participated in this procession.

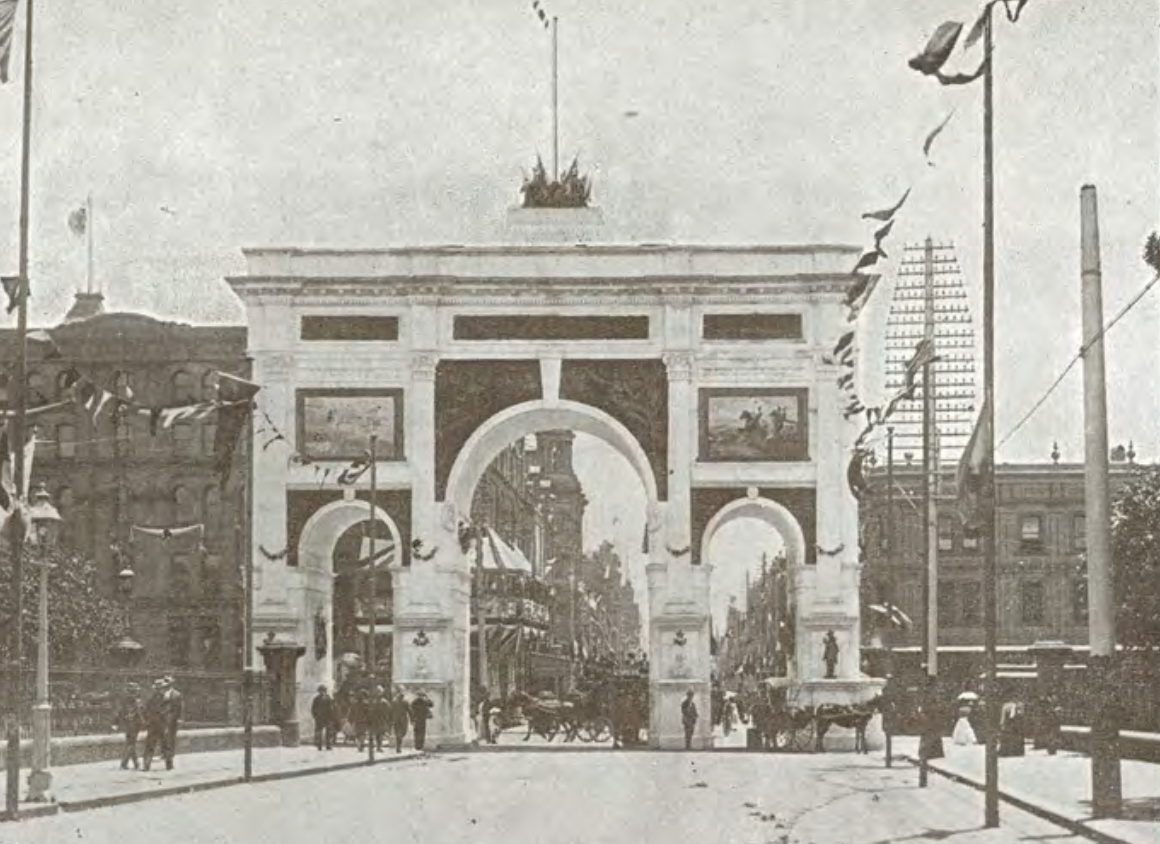
Citizen's Commonwealth Arch, Park Street

The parade is seen to pass under ten elaborate arches which illustrated different aspects of Australian life. The procession placed emphasis on Australia's economic recovery from recession during the 1890s, with several of these arches exhibiting depictions of Australian industries such as the wool industry.

The parade followed a processional route from the public grounds of the Domain, through the central business district and city centre before heading south east towards Centennial Park where a purpose built pavilion was erected for the federation ceremony. Between 250,000 and 500,000 spectators attended the route of the procession. As well as lining the road, people are seen to hang out of windows and climb onto rooftops and awnings in order to get a glimpse of the Procession. Buildings, telegraph poles and streets were festooned with flags, banners, bunting and triumphal arches. These are presented in the film.

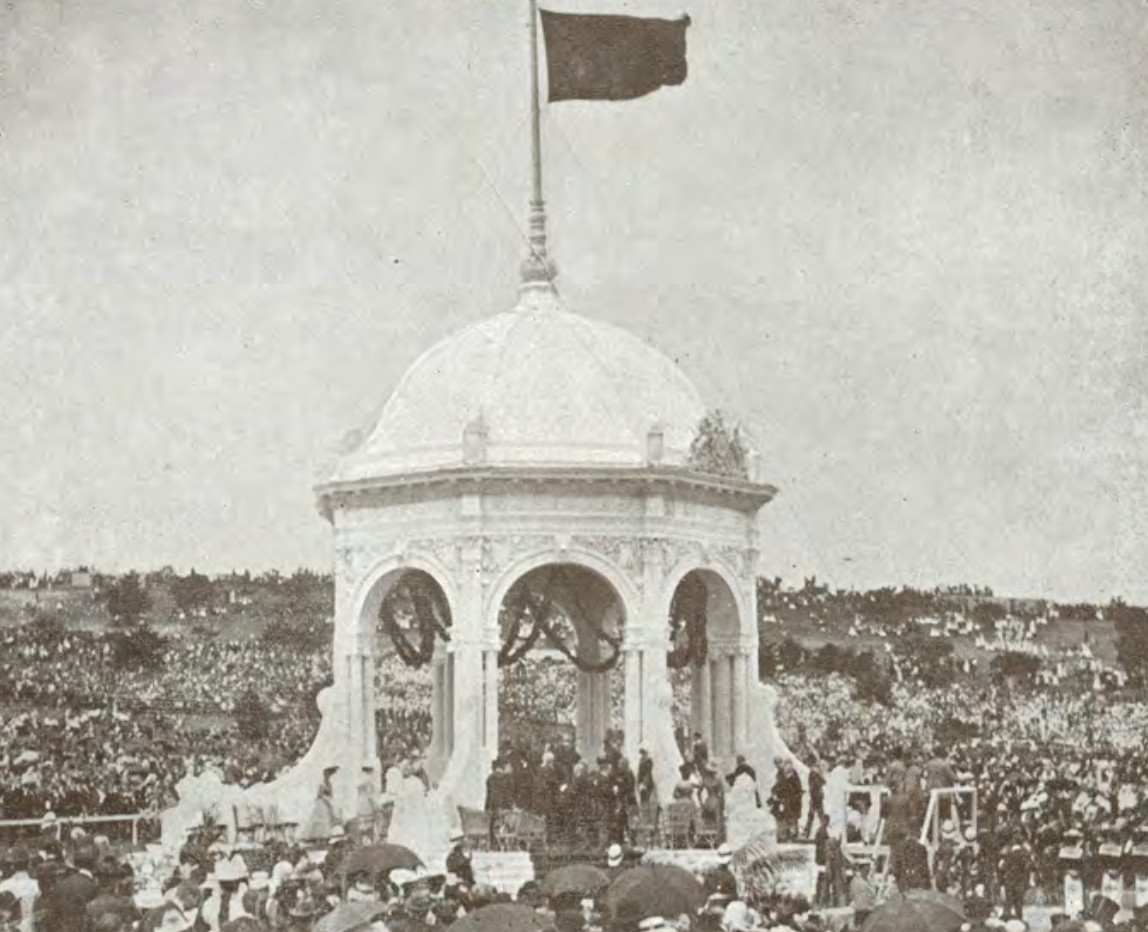
Swearing-in Pavilion, Centennial Park

Within the pavilion at Centennial Park, the Anglican Archbishop of Sydney, William Smith is seen to greet the Governor General John Hope, the Prime Minister Edmund Barton and other dignitaries. Following this, the Governor General directs the swearing in of Australia's first federal cabinet and the reading of the Proclamation of the Constitution. The Governor General and government ministers are depicted signing an oath of allegiance at a table in the centre of the purpose-built pavilion.

The film concludes with footage showing scenes within Centennial Park the day after the events previously mentioned. Within these scenes, the Governor General and leading military figures are seen presiding over large masses of Australian and Imperial troops.

== Production ==
=== Conception ===
Inauguration of the Commonwealth was produced by the Limelight Department of the Salvation Army. The Limelight Department of the Salvation Army was formed in 1891. This corresponded with the founder of the Salvation Army, William Booth, touring Australia for the first time. The Limelight Department was established to create a means by which the Salvation Army could proliferate its message across Australia to a wide audience.

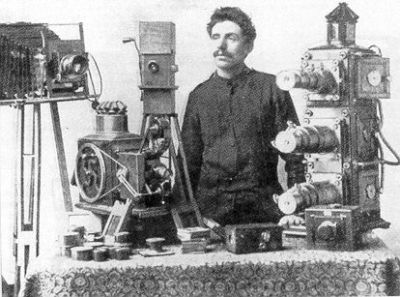
Joseph Perry

The director of Inauguration of the Commonwealth, Joseph Perry, was appointed equipment operator of the Limelight Department soon after its establishment. In this role, he at first directed picture-slide presentations which illustrated the Salvation Army's purpose, and garnered the public to donate to the cause.

Perry directed his first film in 1897, following the Limelight Department obtaining a Lumiere cinematograph camera and projector. Perry directed several films in the four years prior to Inauguration of the Commonwealth, the majority of them illustrating Biblical events.

The Limelight Department of the Salvation Army soon became Australia's largest film producer. Perry and his film crew, known as the First Biorama Company, toured around Australia for months on end presenting films to the public about the Salvation Army in order to build a national identity for the Salvation Army in Australia.

The production of Inauguration of the Commonwealth was commissioned by the New South Wales Premier, Sir William Lyne, in late 1900 as a means of presenting the planned parade for the Federation of Australia to rest of the British Empire.

As The Sydney Morning Herald on 12 November 1900 reported:

“The Premier is of the opinion that the occasion will lend itself to the production of a number of splendid views, and is hopeful that full advantage will be taken of it to secure films that will be viewed with considerable interest by people throughout the British Empire.”

=== Preproduction ===
Prior to the event, several custom-built camera platforms were set up along the route of the procession and in Centennial Park where the federation ceremony was to take place. Each platform was made of timber and offered unobstructed views of both the parade and the ceremony for the cameras mounted on-top. Joseph Perry moved between these platforms on a horse-drawn fire engine, directing three camera crews simultaneously. This was the first instance of simultaneous multiple camera coverage within a film.

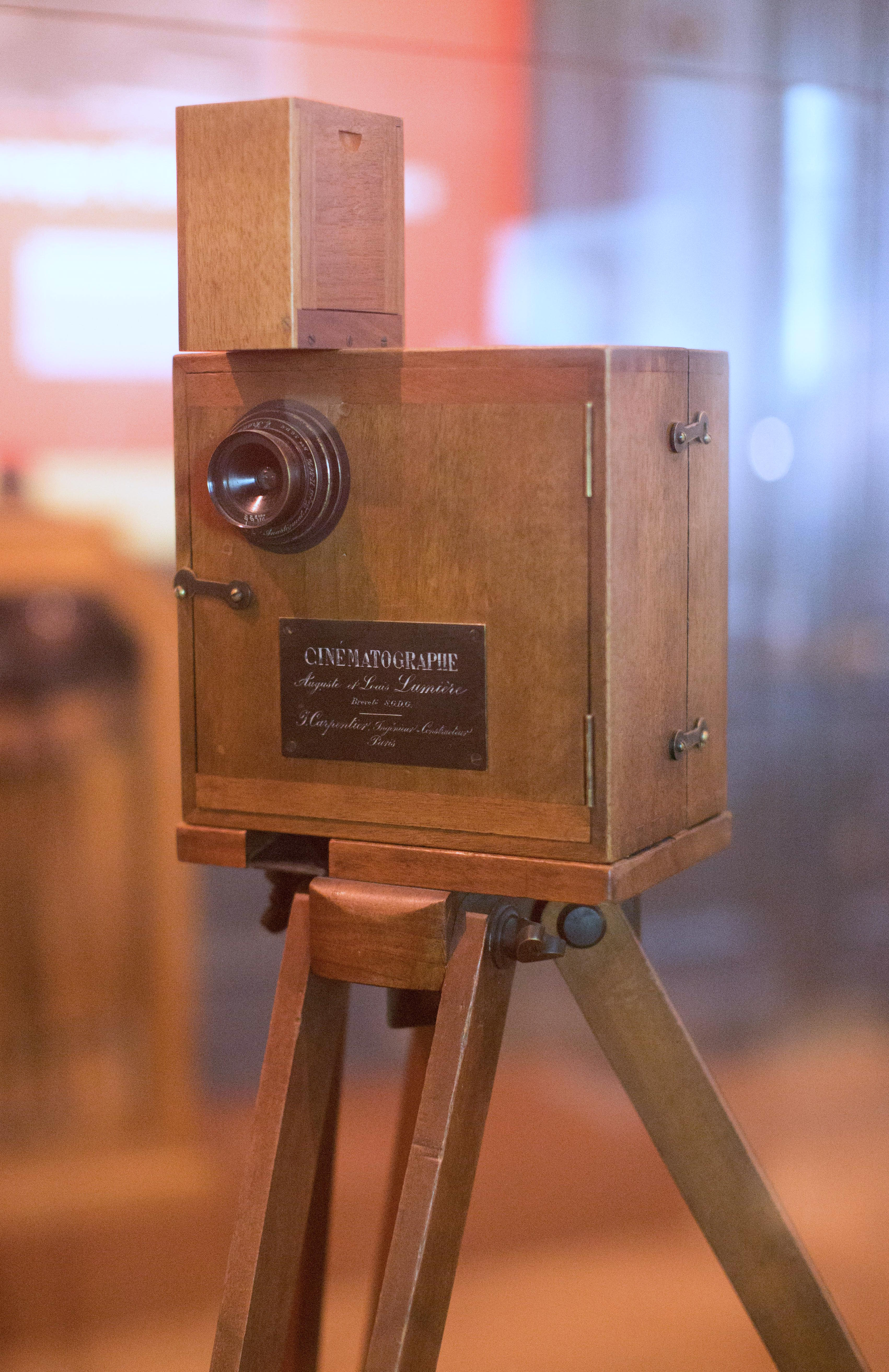
A Lumière Cinematographe Camera

The film was shot using original Lumiere cinematograph cameras, with nearly all the available cameras available in Sydney being in use in production of the film. These cameras were manually operated via a hand crank and utilised a degradable 35mm film. Additionally, these cameras had no pan or tilt capacity and therefore were limited to filming stationary, wide-angled shots.

=== Editing ===
Inauguration of the Commonwealth was edited and printed at the Limelight Department's headquarters in Melbourne. The speed at which the film was edited and printed was unprecedented, with the film's premiere occurring two weeks after its contents being filmed.

== Release ==
Inauguration of the Commonwealth premiered in Sydney at Her Majesty's Theatre on 19 January 1901.

It was the most widely distributed Australian film of its time. It was shown in cinemas across Australia, as well as in Britain and Canada. The success of the film lead the Victorian and New Zealand Governments to commission the Limelight Department to film an upcoming royal visit by the Duke and Duchess of York to Australia and New Zealand to open the first Commonwealth Parliament of Australia. The subsequent film, Royal Visit to Open the First Commonwealth Parliament, was released in May 1901.

== Reception ==
The demand to watch the film was immense, with the Salvation Army establishing ‘The Australian Kinematographic Company’ to manage this demand and separate the unexpected profitability of Inauguration of the Commonwealth from the Salvation Army's charitable mission. Surges in print sales from Australia's major cities led independent film touring companies to distribute the film worldwide.

The proceeds from the film were utilised to support the Salvation Army's mission, as well as to replace the Limelight Department's failing camera equipment.

== Legacy ==
Inauguration of the Commonwealth was the first film to utilise simultaneous multiple camera coverage and to have a run-time of over 30 minutes. With a run time of 35 minutes, it was more than five times longer than any previous Australian film.

Inauguration of the Commonwealth was the first film to contain moving images of a nation being created.

It was the first feature-length documentary film to be produced in Australia. Additionally, it was the most widely distributed Australian film of its time.
