= List of Australian history films =

This is a List of films about Australian history.

== Prior to European settlement ==
- Ten Canoes (2007)

== Early European settlement ==
- The Birth of White Australia (1928)
- Heritage (1935)
- Botany Bay (1953)

=== Convicts ===
- For the Term of His Natural Life (1927)
- Against the Wind (1978) (mini series)

== Gold Rush era ==
- Eureka Stockade (1948)
- Eureka Stockade (1984) (mini-series)

== Bushranger era ==
- The Story of the Kelly Gang (1906)
- Captain Thunderbolt (1953)
- various versions of Robbery Under Arms - ones made in 1957
- The Proposition (2005)

== Up to and around Federation ==
- Wills and Burke (1985)
- Burke and Wills (1985)
- The Chant of Jimmie Blacksmith (1978)
- Oscar and Lucinda (2000)

== Boer War ==
- 'Breaker' Morant (1980)

== World War I ==
=== Gallipoli Campaign ===
- The Hero of the Dardanelles (1915)
- Murphy of Anzac (1916)
- Gallipoli (1981)
- Break of Day (1976)

=== Palestinian Campaign ===
- Forty Thousand Horsemen (1940)
- The Lighthorsemen (1987)

=== Other theatres ===
- How we Beat the Emden (1915)

== World War II ==
=== Australia ===
- The Overlanders (1946)
- Australia (2008)

=== African Campaign ===
- The Rats of Tobruk (1944) - with final sequences in New Guinea

=== Pacific War ===
- Attack Force Z (1981)
- Kokoda (2006)

== Vietnam War ==
- The Odd Angry Shot (1979)
- Vietnam (1988) - mini series
- The Dish (2001)
- Dirty Deeds (2002)
