= Lazarus (1902 film) =

- Production company: Limelight Department
- Distributed by: Salvation Army
- Release date: 1902
- Country: Australia
- Language: silent

Lazarus is a 1902 Australian religious film from the Limelight Department of The Salvation Army in Australia.

== Plot ==
The film details the raising of Lazarus, raising of the son of the widow of Nain, the raising of Jairus' daughter, and the exorcism of the Syrophoenician woman's daughter.
