= Martyn Keith =

Australian film director

Martyn Keith was an Australian actor, writer and director who worked during the silent era.

In 1912 he worked as an acting teacher in Lismore, New South Wales where he also performed in plays for his own company.

== Select filmography ==
- For the Term of His Natural Life (1908) – actor
- 'Neath Austral Skies (1913) – actor
- For Australia (1915) – writer
- The Pioneers (1916) – actor
- Murphy of Anzac (1916) – actor
- The Joan of Arc of Loos – assistant director
- The Woman in the Case (1916) – assistant director
- In the Last Stride (1916) – director
- Showgirl's Luck (1931) – writer

== Select theatre credits ==
- The Living Dead (1906)
- The Little Drummer Boy (1906)
- The Queen of Diamonds (1908)
- The Brand of Cain (1909)
- The Queen of Spies (1910)
- Man's Enemy/The Land of Gold (1910)
- The Night of the Party (1911)
- A Fool There Was (1912)
- A Fool There Was (1912)
- The Scamps of London (1912)
- A Sailor's Sweetheart (1912)
- The Burgular (1916)
- The Scamps of London (1912)
- Capital vs Labor (1916)
- A Remittance Man (1916)
- The Worst Woman in London (1919)
