= The Dancing Class (film) =

- Directed by: Tom Cowan
- Produced by: Tom Cowan
- Starring: Sylvia Palvolgyi
- Cinematography: Nigel Buesst; Tom Cowan
- Edited by: John Richardson
- Music by: George Dreyfus
- Release date: 1964
- Running time: 12 min
- Country: Australia
- Language: English
- Budget: £200

The Dancing Class is a 1964 Australian documentary film made by Tom Cowan. It looks at a ballet class in part focussing on 17 year old dancer Sylvia Palvolgyi. It was filmed in Robert Pomie's ballet studio and featured music composed by George Dreyfus. Cowan shot the film while also working as a camera assistant at the ABC. The film won the 1964 Australian Film Institute Gold Award for Best Documentary.
