= The Scottish Covenanters =

- Directed by: Joseph Perry
- Cinematography: Orrie Perry
- Production company: Limelight Department
- Distributed by: Salvation Army
- Release date: 1909
- Running time: 55 min
- Country: Australia
- Language: silent

The Scottish Covenanters is a 1909 production made by the Limelight Department of the Salvation Army in Australia.

It was shot in a studio in Caulfield. It was the last production made by Joseph Perry for the Salvation Army.

It was released in New Zealand but not Australia.
