= Heroes of the Cross =

- Directed by: Joseph Perry
- Production company: Limelight Department
- Distributed by: The Salvation Army
- Release date: 1909
- Country: Australia
- Language: silent

Heroes of the Cross is a 1909 production by the Limelight Department of The Salvation Army in Australia.

Many items from the production were later mistaken as coming from the 1900 film, Soldiers of the Cross.
