= The Bendigo Independent =

Newspaper published in Bendigo, Victoria, Australia

The Bendigo Independent was a newspaper published in Bendigo, Victoria, Australia.

== History ==
The Independent was founded in Bendigo (also named Sandhurst) in or before March 1862. E. A. Banks (1854–1920) was the editor for many years.

In November 1918 the management of the Independent purchased its competitor The Bendigo Advertiser, and amalgamated the two titles under the banner of the latter.

== Digitization ==
Copies of The Bendigo Independent of most issues from No. 8428 (1 January 1891) to No. 14910 (30 November 1918) have been digitized by the National Library of Australia and may be accessed via Trove. The newspaper was issued daily (except Sundays) during this period.
