= Henry Mobsby =

Henry Mobsby (1860–1933) was a British/Australian artist and photographer, who helped film some of the earliest motion pictures produced in Australia.

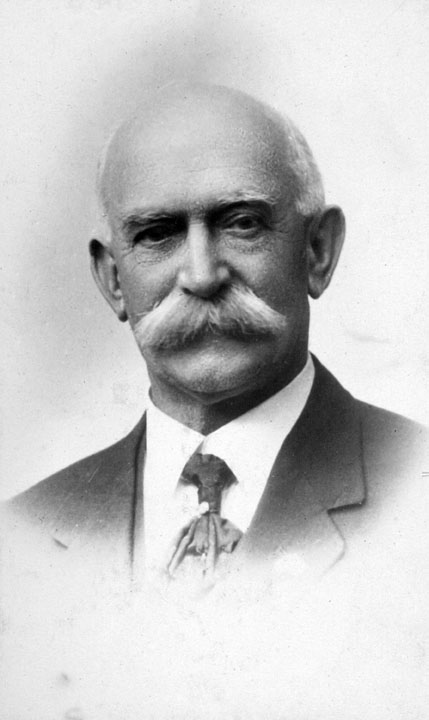
Portrait of Mr Henry William Mobsby, Government Artist and Photographer Department of Agriculture and Stock 1926 Photo courtesy: Queensland State Archives 3761

== Early life ==
Henry William Mobsby (1860-1933) was born on 17 August 1860 in Hove, Sussex, England the son of William Mobsby, a watchman, and his wife Sarah. He was educated at Hampton Place school. He received training in art, design, chemistry and commercial practice at the South Kensington School of Arts, London and the School of Arts, Brighton. He emigrated to Australia in 1883 with artist Isaac Jenner and his family. His brother, Benjamin Mobsby also emigrated with his family to Australia. Henry Mobsby married Jenner's eldest daughter Mary Ellen “Nellie” on 10 September 1884 in Brisbane, Queensland.

== Career ==
Mobsby taught decoration and photography at the Brisbane Technical College. He was appointed an artist and photographer with the Department of Agriculture and Stock in 1897 and the Chief Secretary's Department and the Intelligence and Tourist Bureau in 1907. He became an assistant to Frederick Wills in 1899, who had been charged by the Queensland government to make an early form of motion picture, a cinematograph, celebrating the state's primary industries and resources. Within six months Wills and Mobsby had produced thirty 1 minute films of excursions they took around Queensland, the Torres Straits, and topical events such as the Boer War departure of Queensland troops. By 1900 the technology they had used to film these events had already evolved.

Mobsby took over as official artist and photographer for the Department of Agriculture in 1904 and continued in this role until 1930. He did not continue with film production, preferring to outsource this work to others. He created exhibitions for annual shows and the Royal National Agricultural Exhibition. Mobsby's photography gained international recognition when he represented Queensland at the Franco-British Exhibition in London in 1908. He also exhibited at the Panama Pacific International Exposition in San Francisco in 1915. He undertook a motion picture certificate course during this exposition. He also exhibited at the British Empire Exhibition in Wembley in 1924. He exhibited in Dunedin, New Zealand for the New Zealand and South Seas Exhibition in 1925–1926. Mobsby gave public lectures on Queensland which were illustrated by lantern slides. He also participated in radio broadcasts. He retired in 1930.

== Memberships ==
Fellow, Royal Geographical Society

Fellow, Royal Society of Artists, London

== Legacy ==
Mobsby died on 9 April 1933 in Brisbane. He was survived by his wife and daughter Berta, his son Arthur having pre-deceased him in 1905. The Mobsby Memorial medal was created in his son's name and awarded to Year 8 students at Indooroopilly State School from 1916 to 1950.

Two boxes of his papers, photographs and other materials are held in the University of Queensland Fryer Library and his albums have been digitised. A book describing his life and work was published in 2017. The Lumiere cinematograph is held by the Queensland Museum. Lantern slides of his work are held by the State Library of Queensland.
