= Under Southern Skies (1902 film) =

- Production company: Limelight Department
- Distributed by: The Salvation Army
- Release date: 1902
- Country: Australia
- Language: silent

Under Southern Skies is a 1902 Australian documentary made by the Limelight Department of The Salvation Army in Australia.

It was Australia's first historical documentary.

It consisted of 38 short films and 200 slides and was presented along with a lecture. It told the story of modern Australia's history.
