= Frederick Wills (cinematographer) =

Frederick Charles Wills
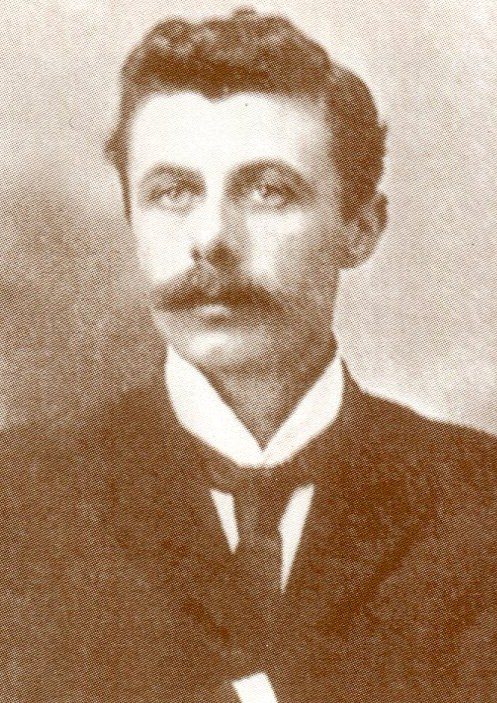
- Born: 14 November 1870; Devon, England
- Died: 8 August 1955 (aged 84)
- Occupations: Illustrator, photographer, cinematographer

Frederick Charles Wills (14 November 1870 – 8 August 1955) was a pioneer of cinematography in Queensland, Australia, recording the first moving images of life in that state between 1899 and 1903.

== Personal life and career ==
Frederick Wills was born in Devon, England, and came to Australia around 1889. He settled in Sydney and lived at Croydon working as an artist. He married in 1895 and moved to Queensland in 1897 where he was employed as an illustrator and photographer for Queensland Department of Agriculture. He worked there until 1903 and it was in this period that he was involved in pioneering cinematography in Queensland. After his resignation in 1903 he operated a photographic studio in George Street Brisbane for two years.

Wills and his family then moved to Toowoomba where he started a photographic equipment business and photo studio in Ruthven Street. This business prospered until 1914 when he left Toowoomba, it is not certain where he went from there as there are no surviving records apart from his obituary in The Sydney Morning Herald in 1955 which noted he had died in Rowena in north-western New South Wales.

There are numerous other surviving images and publications as he was active in doing professional and studio photography until the late 1930s. He also produced many pictorial guides and postcards, plus there remains a large body of work from his time in the Department of Agriculture.

== The story behind the films of Frederick Wills ==
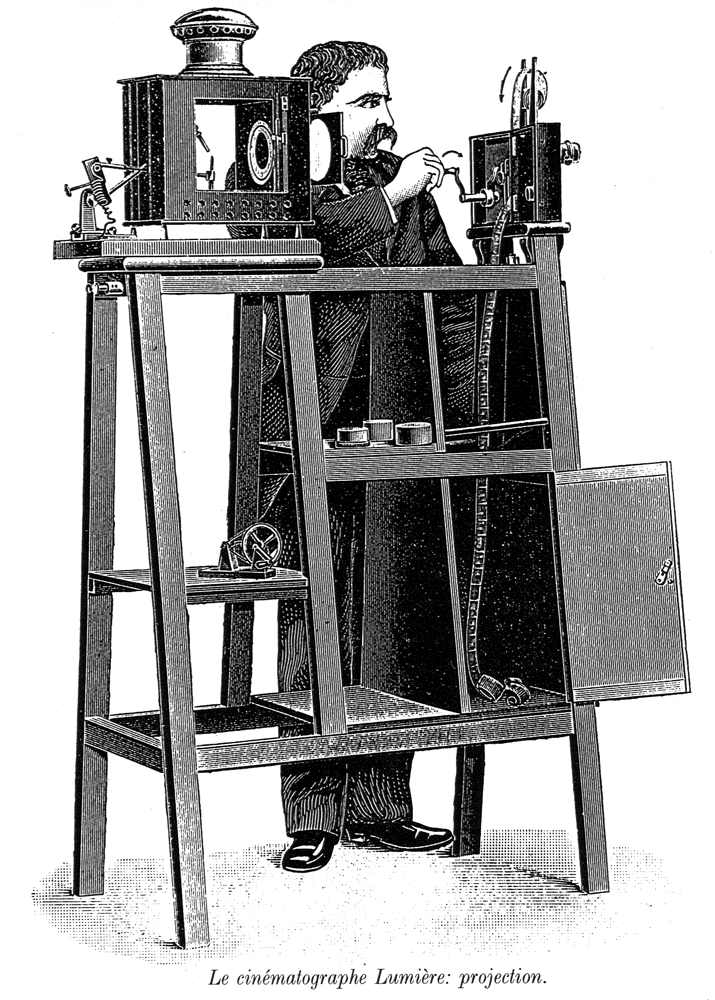
The cinématographe Lumière in projection mode.

In early 1899 Wills purchased a Lumiere Cinematographe for the Department of Agriculture so that films of agricultural scenes could be taken for showing at the 1899 Greater Britain Exhibition to intending immigrants. He was assisted by Henry Mobsby, a photographer with the Department of Agriculture. Thirty one-minute films were taken in 1899, including test footage showing early scenes of Sydney and Brisbane.

The films were screened only once at the Department of Agriculture in Brisbane and were never used again. They were stored away along with the camera and did not re-surface until the building was being renovated in 1955 when they were donated to the Queensland Museum. The films were sent in 1982 to the National Film and Sound Archive where they were copied to modern 35mm stock for preservation. The films are unique due to being the first known films taken by any government agency anywhere in the world. They are the largest surviving collection of Australian colonial films and include the first films taken of Brisbane and some of the earliest footage taken of Sydney. They were the first films to be taken by a Queenslander and are the earliest Australian industrial documentary films and amongst the earliest of their type in the world.

== Centenary rescreening ==
In 1999 there was a rescreening of Wills' films to celebrate the centenary of their production. This was organised by the Department of Primary Industries, the Queensland Museum and the Centenary of Federation - Queensland. Wills' films and photographs are preserved in the Queensland Museum and the National Film and Sound Archive in Canberra.
