= Royal Visit to Open the First Commonwealth Parliament =

- Based on: Documentary
- Cinematography: Joseph Perry
- Production company: Limelight Department
- Release date: May 1901
- Country: Australia
- Language: Silent

Royal Visit to Open the First Commonwealth Parliament was a 1901 Australian documentary film made by the Limelight Department of the Salvation Army in Australia.

The first Commonwealth Parliament was opened by the Duke of Cornwall and York (later King George V) in Melbourne on 9 May 1901.

The film included the arrival of the Duke and Duchess of Cornwall and York at St Kilda pier on 6 May and external views around the opening of Federal Parliament on the 9th. Other activities were shot during their visit, such as the Duke laying the Boer War Memorial Foundation Stone in Ballarat.

Minimal footage still survives today.
