= Beatrice Day =

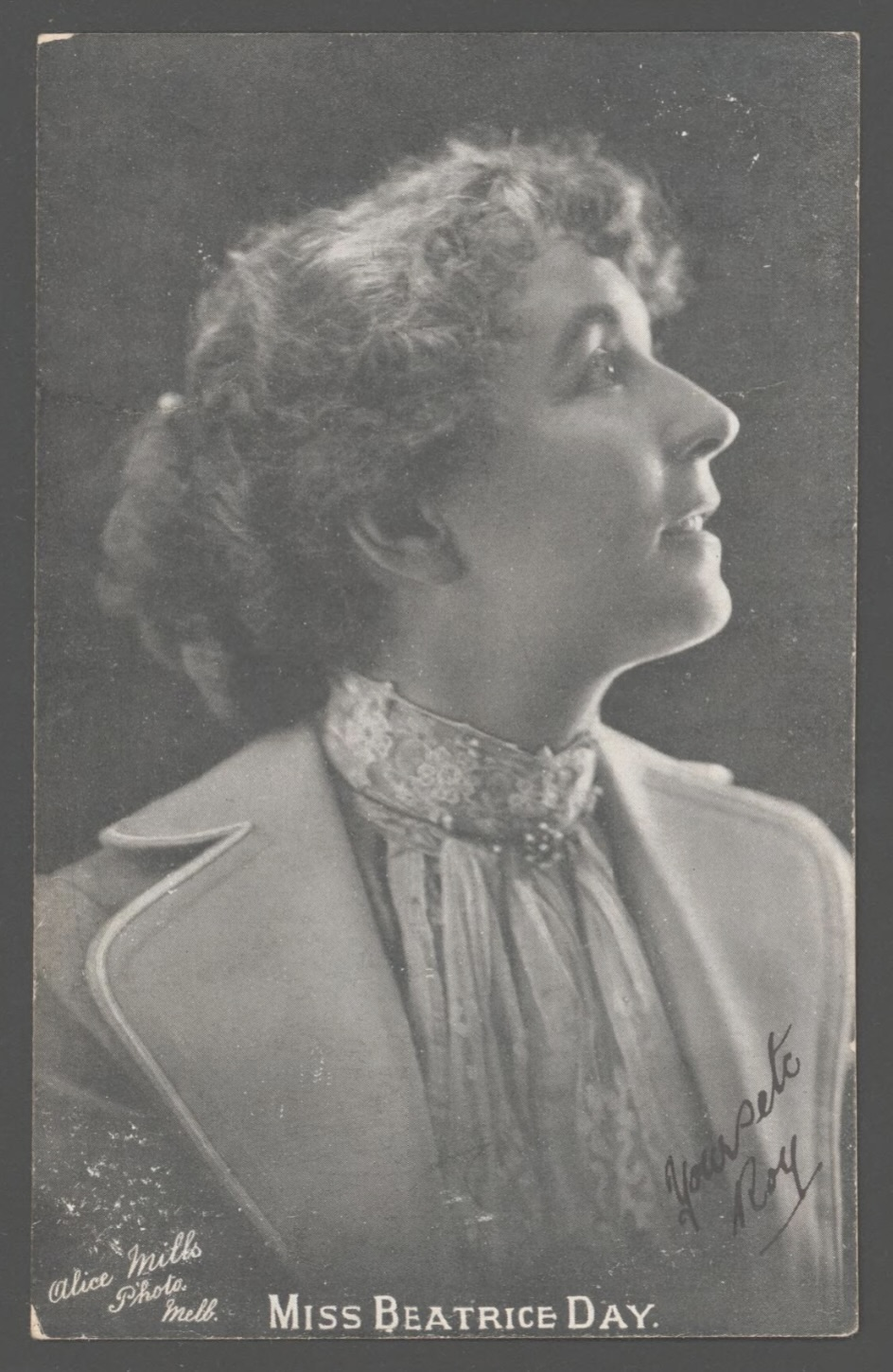
- Day in 1906
- Born: 1864 or 1865; Essex, England
- Died: 4 September 1933 (aged 68)

Beatrice Day (1864/1865 — 4 September 1933) was an English stage actress who toured to South Africa and Australia with the leading companies of the time.

== Life ==
Day was a farmer's daughter, born in 1864 or 1865 in Essex, England. One of 12 children, it was expected she would take up nursing but instead she chose the stage, after which it took three years for her family to accept her decision. Her early theatre work was for Beerbohm Tree on the London stage and she also studied voice production with Emil Banke.

She came to Australia in 1898 under contract to Harry Rickards. Her first appearance was in Melbourne in The Little Minister, adapted for the stage from J. M. Barrie's novel of the same name. She toured South Africa in 1900 with Herbert Flemming where they were caught up in the Siege of Mafeking during the Boer War. The company performed in Johannesburg, Pretoria and Bloemfontain over a 44-week run, during which she played 47 roles, spending Wednesdays entertaining wounded soldiers in hospital. Day returned to Australia in 1903 to join J. C. Williamson's and again in 1905 arriving in Perth with the Brough-Flemming Company, where she appeared as Lady Alethea in The Walls of Jericho.

In Australia, at the outbreak of World War I, Day launched the Beatrice Day Copper Fund, collecting copper coins from theatre-goers and movie patrons to aid the Red Cross. When she left for London in mid-1916, following a tour of New Zealand where she founded the Anti-German League, her fund had raised £1,200.

From the mid-1920s Day worked as a voice coach and drama teacher at Gregan McMahon's acting school. She assessed the talents of would-be actresses, including Thelma Scott and taught "voice production and good diction" to those given new contracts by Efftee Studios.

According to her obituary in The Melbourne Herald, Day was "generally admitted to have the most beautiful speaking voice in Australia". Her final stage appearance was in Disraeli with the Gregan McMahon Repertory.

== Personal and death ==
Day married Edward William Wall, from Devonshire. They had one son, Robin, who was wounded while serving in the 1st Lincolnshire Regiment in World War I. After the war, she settled in Western Australia with her son. After his marriage in 1924, Day returned to the stage.

Day collapsed during the dress rehearsal for Clara Gibbings and died several days later at a private hospital in Melbourne on 4 September 1933. She was 68 years old. Day was buried in the Melbourne General Cemetery after a service at Sleight's chapel led by Canon F. E. C. Crotty.
