= Limelight Department =

Film studio of the Salvation Army from 1898 to 1910

- Company type: Subsidiary
- Industry: Motion pictures
- Founded: Melbourne, Australia (1891)
- Headquarters: Melbourne, Australia
- Parent: The Salvation Army

The Limelight Department was one of the world's first film studios, beginning in 1898, operated by The Salvation Army in Melbourne, Australia. The Limelight Department produced evangelistic material for use by the Salvation Army, including lantern slides as early as 1891, as well as private and government contracts. In its 19 years of operation, the Limelight Department produced about 300 films of various lengths, making it one of largest film producers of its time.

== Beginnings ==
The Salvation Army Limelight Department unofficially started in 1891, when Adjutant Joseph Perry started a photographic studio in Ballarat, Victoria, to supplement the income of the Salvation Army's Prison Gate Home. At the time, Perry was on compassionate leave from active ministry, as his wife Annie had died earlier that year, leaving Perry to raise their three children. In September 1891, Perry was temporarily reassigned to the Australasian Headquarters in Melbourne to assist Australasian commander, Commissioner Thomas Coombs, in putting together a presentation of General William Booth's In Darkest England program. At this stage, Perry was using lantern slides which projected hand coloured photographs onto a large screen. Coombs was impressed by the quality and effectiveness of presentation, making Perry's move to Melbourne permanent. The Limelight Department was officially established on 11 June 1892. In 1896, when Commissioner Coombs was replaced as Australasian commander by General Booth's youngest son, 'Commandant Herbert Booth. Booth immediately warmed to the innovation of the Limelight Department, giving Perry the freedom and the financial support to expand into the newly developing medium of film. Under Booth's direction, Perry started work on Social Salvation in 1898, one of the first presentations of its type to integrate the traditional lantern slides with film segments. On 20 December 1899, the Limelight Department premiered a series on the Passion at the Collingwood corps. The presentation contained thirteen, ninety second sections which portrayed the life of Jesus from birth to death. The presentation was similar in style to that produced by the Lumiere Company earlier that year, however, as none of the original film remains, it can never be determined if the Limelight Department used Lumiere footage in the presentation.

== Soldiers of the Cross ==
The major innovation of the Limelight Department would come in 1899 when Booth and Perry began work on Soldiers of the Cross, arguably the first feature-length film (see the last section, below).

The presentation contained fifteen ninety-second sections and two hundred lantern slides, and ran for nearly two and a half hours. While some Lumiere footage was used in the opening passion sequence of the film, the majority of the footage was filmed in Melbourne, either in the attic of 69 Bourke Street, on the tennis court of the Murrumbeena Girls Home, or in the pool at Richmond Baths.

The presentation itself focused of the lives and deaths of early Christian martyrs and cost £550 to produce. The scenes were considered extremely violent for their time, including such images as the stoning of Stephen, the burning of Polycarp and unnamed Christians being tortured, beheaded, killed by gladiators, drowned, or burned alive. The presentation included a cast of 150 Salvation Army officers who were stationed in Melbourne at the time. The many death scenes took their toll, with the cast suffering various injuries, including scorched hair and eyebrows from the fires used. The presentation premiered on 13 September 1901, at the Melbourne Town Hall, to a crowd somewhere between three and four thousand. One reviewer spoke of how the death scenes caused several women to faint in the aisles.

== The Federation of Australia ==
Soldiers of the Cross fortified the Limelight Department as a major player in the early film industry. However, Soldiers of the Cross would be dwarfed by Inauguration of the Australian Commonwealth, when the Limelight Department was commissioned to film the 1901 Federation of Australia. It was the hope of the New South Wales government that the film would prove an imperishable record of the event, though little of the footage still exists. Perry set up five cameras at various point of the procession route and had to use a fire carriage to move quickly from one camera to the next.

== The height of operation ==
In order that Soldiers of the Cross could be seen by a wide audience, the Limelight Department created groups known as Biorama Companies. Teams of musicians, lecturers, and projectionists would travel throughout Australia presenting the material that the Limelight Department had produced. Screenings were generally held in local halls, but it was the Biorama Companies sometimes used the sides of buildings as screens so that passersby could see it. When Herbert left the Salvation Army (taking the original Soldiers of the Cross material with him), he was replaced by Commissioner Thomas McKie. McKie encouraged the expansion of the Limelight Department, the creation of additional Biorama Companies and even the reshooting of Soldiers of the Cross in 1909, titled Heroes of the Cross. In addition to the evangelical material produced for the Biorama Companies, the Limelight produced many films for private clients and the government. Some of the most notable of these were films showing the royal visit of the Duke and Duchess of York for the opening of the first sitting of the Parliament of Australia (the session itself could not be filmed due to poor lighting), the visit of America's Great White Fleet, and the Victoria's Second Boer War Contingent leaving South Africa. Engaging in such private contracts was a way in which the Limelight Department raised capital to support its operation and the operation of other Salvation Army programs.

== The end of the Limelight Department ==
In 1910, McKie was replaced as the Australasian commander by a more conservative Commissioner named James Hay. Hay felt that cinema was not something that the church should be involved in and he shut down the Limelight Department at the height of its operation. In his autobiography Aggressive Salvationism, Hay wrote 'the cinema, as conducted by The Salvation Army, had led to weakness and a lightness incompatible with true Salvationism and was completely ended by me.'

== Is Soldiers of the Cross the world's first feature film? ==
For many years, a question mark has hung over the question of whether Soldiers of the Cross should be counted as the first feature film. The issues of concern are basically length of the footage, length of the presentation, and the continuity of the storyline.

A feature film is generally defined as running for over sixty minutes with a constant storyline running throughout. Placed end to end, the film footage in Soldiers of the Cross equals twenty-two and a half minutes, falling short of the time requirements. Furthermore, the film did not have one long story, but rather a collection of short stories which also seems to disqualify it from contention. However, it has been argued that as the entire presentation, including films strips, lantern slides and live sections, runs for over two hours, Soldiers of the Cross. If it should not be considered a feature film, then without doubt it pre-dates contemporary multi-media, being the mix of text, graphics, illustration with still and moving images. The first Australian 'digital production' multi-media company was Brigalow Publishing established in Canberra in the late 1980s. Its claim comes of the fact it introduced into the Yellow Pages telephone directory the category first.

In 1902, the year after Soldiers of the Cross was made, the Limelight Department produced Under Southern Skies, a film examining life in Australia from European Settlement to Federation. This film ran about one hundred minutes but as it is a documentary, not a dramatised story, it is not considered to be a feature film. Heroes of the Cross ran for about 75 minutes and contained a more defined story thread than its predecessor; however, it was produced in 1909, three years after The Story of the Kelly Gang (1906) which is considered by most people to be the actual first feature film, including the Australian Film Commission.

== Heritage ==
The original studio still stands today and is being preserved as part of The Salvation Army - Australia Southern Territory Archives and Museum. One of the films included is the documentary of the Inauguration of the Australian Commonwealth.

== Filmography ==
This list of films includes some films shown by the Biorama companies, acquired but not originally produced by the Limelight Department.

- Social Salvation (1898)
- The Salvation Army Congress, Melbourne (1898)
- Passion Films (1899)
- Boys bathing at Riverview
- Falling trees and burning same at Riverview
- The Early Day Christian Martyrs (1900)
- Soldiers of the Cross (1900)
- Second Victorian Contingent Leaving Melbourne (1900)
- The arrival of Lord Roberts
- Counting sheep on a station
- Fire engine working at Hordern's big fire in Sydney (1901)
- Feeding pigs
- Steeplechase
- Seas breaking at Warrnambool
- Inauguration of the Australian Commonwealth (1901)
- Royal Visit to Open the First Commonwealth Parliament (1901)
- Royal Visit of the Duke and Duchess of Cornwall and York to New Zealand (1901)
- Aboriginal Life (1901)
- Under Southern Skies (1902)
- Lazarus (1902)
- Bushranging in North Queensland (1902)
- Waimangu Geyser in action
- Two tramps
- Gabriel Grub
- The doctor's fee
- Bad coffee
- March past of Salvationists
- High sea fishing
- Count in search of a wife
- Robbing the mail
- Christ Among Men (1906)
- The Gardener's Nap
- Caught by the Tide
- Raid on a Corner Den
- The Aeroplane
- Chicago Brigade
- A Rough Sea
- Character Retrieved
- The Heart Governs the Head
- Message from the Sea
- The Blind Man's Child
- Oh, that Molar
- Oh, that Hat
- The Terrible Kids
- How the Bulldog saved the Union Jack
- The Fire at Sea
- The Grand Memorial Service (1908)
- The Great White Fleet Visits the Antipodes (1908)
- Heroes of the Cross (1909)
- The Scottish Covenanters (1909)

== See also ==
- The Salvation Army
- William Booth
- Film, History of cinema
- Royal Visit of the Duke and Duchess of Cornwall and York to New Zealand
