= Social Salvation =

1898 documentary film directed by Herbert Booth

- Directed by: Herbert Booth
- Written by: Herbert Booth; Joseph Perry
- Production company: Limelight Department of the Salvation Army
- Release date: 1 July 1898 (Australia)
- Country: Australia
- Language: Silent

Social Salvation started as an 1898 series of films and slides produced by the Limelight Department of the Salvation Army in Australia. It was directed by Herbert Booth, who would present the films while lecturing. By 1900 it had evolved to a series of 25 one minute films and 275 slides.

It has been acclaimed as the first Australian narrative film on social work.
