= Joseph Perry (cinematographer) =

English cinematographer, entrepreneur and army officer

Joseph Henry Perry
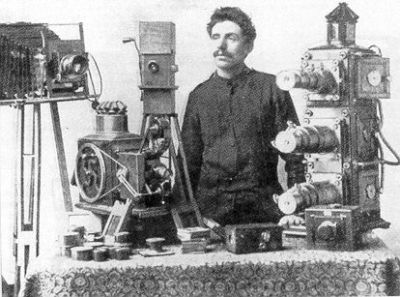
- Joseph Perry with equipment
- Born: 5 August 1863; Birmingham, Warwickshire, UK
- Died: 29 April 1943 (aged 79); Sydney, Australia
- Occupation(s): Salvation Army officer, cinematographer, entrepreneur

Joseph Henry Perry (5 August 1863 in Birmingham, Warwickshire, UK – 29 April 1943 in Sydney, Australia) was an English-born New Zealander and Australian cinematographer, entrepreneur and Salvation Army officer. Born to Joseph Perry Sr. and Eliza Hall, his sons Orizaba, Reginald and Stanley also went on to have careers in the Australian film industry.

Perry helped establish Australia's first film studio in Melbourne, and went on to make several early multi media presentations for the Army's Limelight Department including with Herbert Booth, Soldiers of the Cross.

Perry was responsible for capturing the first ever inauguration of a nation (Australia) recorded on film in history.

Perry initiated the setting up of Salvation Army Biorama companies with projection equipment and electric generators, to travel around the country giving presentations.

== Filmography ==
=== Australia ===
- 1898 Social Salvation (Documentary)
- 1899 Passion Films (Short)
- 1900 Second Victorian Contingent Leaving Melbourne (Documentary short)
- 1900 Soldiers of the Cross
- 1901 Inauguration of the Commonwealth (Documentary)
- 1901 Royal Visit to Open the First Commonwealth Parliament (Documentary)
- 1904 International Congress of the Salvation Army (Documentary)
- 1908 The Great White Fleet Visits the Antipodes (Documentary)
- 1909 Heroes of the Cross
- 1909 The Scottish Covenanters

=== New Zealand ===
- 1898 Māori Scenes
- 1901 Royal Visit of the Duke and Duchess of Cornwall and York to New Zealand (Documentary short)
- Waimangu Geyser in action
- 1905 James Cook's 1769 landing in Gisborne (re-enactment)
