= Herbert Booth =

British Salvation Army officer (1862–1926)

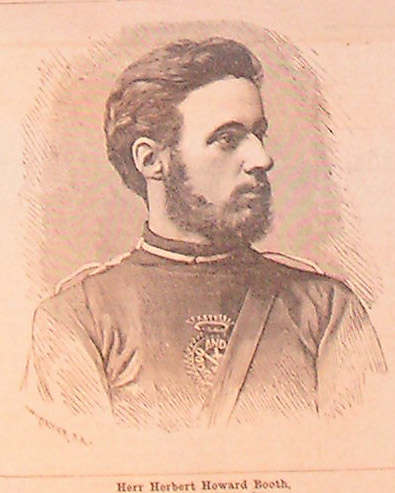
Herbert Booth.

Herbert Henry Howard Booth (26 August 1862 – 25 September 1926) was a Salvation Army officer, the third son of five children to William and Catherine Booth (Mumford), who later went on to serve as an independent evangelist. He oversaw the Limelight Department's development and he was the writer and director for Soldiers of the Cross.

== Early life ==
Herbert, who was born in Penzance, Cornwall, received little formal elementary education but became a student at Allesly Park College and the Congregational Institute at Nottingham. At the age of twenty, Herbert began helping his sister Kate Booth in building up The Salvation Army in France. Two years later, he was given charge of England's cadet officer training. He wrote many songs for The Salvation Army and became a bandmaster and a songster leader. He was the first Salvation Army Officer to use the magic lantern for presentations in England.

In 1886, Herbert Booth took ill and went to Australia to rest and heal. While staying in a mining town there, he found a gold nugget. He eventually forged a ring out of it for his future wife, Dutch Salvationist Cornelie Schoch.

== Salvation Army ==
Herbert Booth took command of all Salvation Army operations in the British Isles when he was 26. Then, from 1892–1896, he was the Commandant for the Salvation Army in Canada. Next, he was appointed to the Australasian Territory where his health continued to deteriorate. He struggled with depression, but was still very active in his position.

In Australia, Herbert took considerable interest in the Salvation Army's Limelight Department there. He soon authorized extensive expansion, allowing Limelight to make Australia's first fictional narrative film in 1897. The following year, he and early cinematographer Joe Perry produced Social Salvation, a multimedia presentation that portrayed the work of The Salvation Army in its Australasian Territory. Whilst appointed to the territory Herbert also founded the Hamodava Tea Company, which pioneered fair trade in the beverage industry, and secured funding for The Salvation Army's work in Australia and New Zealand.

Herbert, whose relations with his brother Bramwell had gone from bad to worse, hoped that some close contact with his father might help heal his rift with London. It did not. William Booth had total confidence in Bramwell and left Herbert and Cornelie "utterly dispirited and broken-hearted." To help shake off the depression, Herbert threw himself into a period of frenetic activity. Seventy projects were launched to celebrate his father's seventieth birthday, one of which was the building of an officer training garrison at Victoria Parade, East Melbourne. To enlist trainees, Herbert wrote and directed Soldiers of the Cross, a recruiting show that featured stories of early Christian martyrs. Soldiers of the Cross, written and directed by Herbert, again with Joe Perry as cinematographer, premiered at the Melbourne Town Hall on 13 September 1900.

Early in 1901, the strain on Herbert from his deteriorating relations with his father and Bramwell became intolerable. At first he decided he needed a complete break from high command, but while resting in a Salvation Army property on the Collie River in Western Australia, he decided to leave the organisation. He was not the first Booth to resign and so he knew this would mean ostracism from the family. Nevertheless, he decided to go, but wanted to take Soldiers of the Cross with him. Negotiations with Bramwell Booth were drawn out, but in the end, it was agreed that payment would be the transfer to The Salvation Army of the copyright to all the songs he had written during his early years with the Salvation Army. Herbert and Cornelie sailed for San Francisco, and a new life, in August 1902. He used Soldiers of the Cross in his crusades in the United States, Canada, England, New Zealand, and Australia for many years.

== Death ==
While Herbert was touring New Zealand in 1920, Cornelie died in England. Three years later, he married Anne Lane, Cornelie's traveling partner in the United States and a former Salvation Army Officer. Three years after that, Herbert died in New York City.

== Filmography ==
- Social Salvation (1898)
- Soldiers of the Cross (with Joseph Perry) (1900)
