= List of Australian sports films =

This is a compilation of Australian films in the genre covering sports activities. Films may cover issues in sport as World Series Cricket, 1968 Olympics Black Power salute, personalities Dawn Fraser and Phar Lap, sporting events and tours and satire. Films provide an insight into the importance of sport into Australian society. Films include fictional and non-fictional stories.

Sport	Title	Date	Gentre	Comments
Athletics	Salute	2008	Documentary	Peter Norman role in the 1968 Olympics Black Power salute.
Athletics	The Four Minute Mile	1988	Drama	Mini-series about the race to run the Four-minute mile, focusing on the rivalry between Roger Bannister and John Landy.
Athletics	Cliffy	2013	Telemovie	Story of ultra marathoner Cliff Young.
Football	The Club	1980	Comedy	Based on satirical play by David Williamson. Inspired by the backroom dealings and antics of the Victorian Football League's Collingwood Football Club.
Football	Australian Rules	2002	Drama	
Football	The Great Macarthy	1975	Comedy	Adaptation of the novel A Salute to the Great Macarthy by Barry Oakley. and about a local footballer who is signed up (or more appropriately, kidnapped) by the South Melbourne Football Club (now Sydney Swans).
Football	Year of the Dogs	1997	Documentary	Follows the 1996 season of the Footscray Football Club (now Western Bulldogs).
Football	Valentine's Day	2008	Comedy	Story about famous Aussie Rules footballer fallen on hard times that is required to coach "no-hoper" football team as part of a community service order.
Football	Blinder	2013	Drama	Story about aspiring football star who fled Australia following a local scandal.
Football	Joffa: The Movie	2010	Comedy	Story of Australia's best known sports fan, Joffa Corfe.
Football	Aussie Rules the World	2014	Documentary	
Football	War Without Weapons	1980	Documentary	Behind-the-scenes look at the North Melbourne Football Club and its head coach Ron Barassi during the 1979 Victorian Football League season.
Football	Life of the Town	2009	Documentary	Thirteen half-hour episodes of grassroots football ' tracking the fortunes of the Ongerup Football Club through the 2008 season.
Football	The Warriors	2017	TV series	Explores the elite world of professional sport through the eyes of recruits and established players living in a share house.
Football	League of Their Own	2017	Documentary	Historic story behind the Women's Australian Football League and the athletes and trailblazers who made it happen.
Football	The Merger	2018	Comedy	Film explores the decline of a cash-strapped Aussie Rules rural footy club and the recruitment of refugees to keep the club viable.
Football	The Final Quarter	2019	Documentary	The final stages of the Australian football career of Adam Goodes, during which he was the target of repeated booing by opposition fans.
Football	The Australian Dream	2019	Documentary	Documentary that uses the remarkable and inspirational story of AFL legend Adam Goodes as the prism through which to tell a deeper and more powerful story about race, identity and belonging.
Football	Collingwood: From the Inside Out	2019	Documentary	Collingwood Football Club's journey to rebuild itself through the 2018 AFL season.
Boxing	Rose Against the Odds	1991	Drama	Mini-series about world boxing champion Lionel Rose.
Boxing	Lionel	2008	Documentary	Interviews with Lionel Rose, his family and friends.
Boxing	Two Fists, One Heart	2008	Drama	
Boxing	Kid Snow	2024	Drama	A film set in 1970s Western Australia during the final days of tent boxing troupes.
Cricket	Save Your Legs!	2012	Comedy	
Cricket	Bodyline	1984	Drama	Mini-series about English cricket team in Australia in 1932–33 and its bodyline bowling tactic.
Cricket	Bradman	1991	Documentary	Definitive video of Sir Donald Bradman's life, from his youth and unsurpassed cricketing career, through to his time as Chairman of the Australian Cricket Board.
Cricket	Backyard Ashes	2013	Comedy	
Cricket	Howzat! Kerry Packer's War	2012	Drama	Mini-series about World Series Cricket (WSC), a break away professional cricket competition staged between 1977 and 1979.
Cricket	How McDougall Topped the Score	1924	Drama	
Cricket	Prince Ranjitsinhji Practising Batting in the Nets	1897	Documentary	One of the earliest surviving cricket films.
Cricket	Warnie	2017	TV Mini-series	Life of Australian spin bowler Shane Warne.
Cycling	BMX Bandits	1983	Drama	
Cycling	Tracks of Glory	1992	TV mini-series	Visit of Major Taylor to Australian and his rivalry with Australian cycler Don Walker in 1903.
Greyhound racing	Gone to the Dogs	1939	Comedy	
Horse racing	A horse named Winx	2024	Documentary	The story of Winx, a horse that captured Australia through an extraordinary 33-race winning streak.
Horse racing	Ride Like a Girl	2019	Drama	The story of Michelle Payne, the first female jockey to win the Melbourne Cup.
Horse racing	The Cup	2011	Drama	
Horse racing	Phar Lap	1983	Drama	Story of Phar Lap, a champion Australian racehorse during The Great Depression.
Horse racing	Thoroughbred	1936	Drama	
Horse racing	A Rough Passage	1922	Drama	
Horse racing	Silks and Saddles	1921	Drama	
Horse racing	Desert Gold	1919	Drama	
Horse racing	Won on the Post	1912	Drama	
Horse racing	The Double Event	1911	Drama	
Horse racing	The Cup Winner	1911	Drama	
Horse racing	A Ticket in Tatts	1911	Comedy	
Horse racing	Keane of Kalgoorlie	1911	Drama	Australian silent film set in the racing and gambling circles of Sydney, based on a popular play by Edward William O'Sullivan and Arthur Wright, adapted from the novel by Wright.
Horse racing	The Melbourne Cup	1896	Documentary	Series of Australian silent films being the first time the Melbourne Cup Carnival was filmed.
Lawn bowls	Crackerjack	2002	Comedy	
Motor sport	Brock	2016	TV series	Chronicles the life of Australian driver Peter Brock.
Netball	The Last Great Amateurs	2004	Documentary	Melbourne Phoenix players, coach and administrators are followed through a season.
Rowing	Paris or the Bush : the story of the Cods	2015	Documentary	The story of the men's eight rowing team from Murray Bridge, South Australia that overcame multiple hurdles to qualify for the 1924 Paris Olympics.
Rugby league	Chasing Comets	2018	Drama	Follows the onfield and offield life of Chase who is following his dream of playing National Rugby League.
Rugby league	Broke	2015	Drama	Story about a professional rugby league footballer at the end of his career with a gambling addiction and he is able to win back the respect.
Rugby league	The Final Winter	2007	Drama	
Rugby league	Footy Legends	2006	Comedy	
Rugby league	Fibros and the Silvertail	2008	Documentary	The feud between two football teams - Fibros (Western Suburbs Magpies) and Silvertails (Manly Warringah Sea Eagles).
Rugby league	The First Kangaroos	1988	Drama	The 1908–09 Kangaroo tour of Great Britain, the first-ever such tour by the Australia national rugby league team
Soccer	Offside	2009	Comedy	
Soccer	Johnny Warren's Football Mission	2006	Documentary	Chronicles the life of Johnny Warren.
Skating	Deck Dogz	2005	Drama	
Freestyle skiing	The Will To Fly	2016	Documentary	Olympic aerial skiing champion Lydia Lassila returns to the sport as a mother to perform the most complex acrobatic manoeuvre ever performed by a woman.
Surf life saving	the Coolangatta Gold	1984	Drama	Film which led to the establishment of the iron man race The Coolangatta Gold.
Surfing	Fighting Fear	2013	Documentary	
Surfing	Bra Boys: Blood is Thicker than Water	2007	Documentary	
Surfing	The Endless Summer	1966	Documentary	
Surfing	The Endless Summer II	1994	Documentary	
Surfing	Drift	2013	Drama	
Surfing	Palm Beach	1980	Drama	
Surfing	Puberty Blues	1981	Drama	
Surfing	Women in surf	1986	Documentary	
Surfing	Puberty Blues (TV series)	2012	TV series	
Swimming	The Dawn Fraser Story	1964	Documentary	History of women's surfing in Australia from 1915, through the big board era to 1986.
Swimming	Dawn!	1979	Drama	The film deals with Dawn Fraser's rise to fame as a champion Olympic swimmer, her anti-authoritarian clashes with Australian Swimming officials, her triumphs, marriage and eventual divorce.
Swimming	Swimming Upstream	2003	Drama	Young male swimmer overcomes family dysfunction to become a world-class athlete.
Swimming	Barracuda	2016	TV series	
Swimming	Streamline	2021	Drama	Story of a teenage swimmer who faces problems after his father leaves jail.
Windsurfing	Windrider	1986	Drama	
Women's sport	The Game is Up!	1993	Documentary	Historical look at women in sport in Australia between 1896 and 1956.
Yachting	Aussie Assault	1984	Documentary	Story of Australia II winning the 1983 America's Cup.
Yachting	The Challenge	1986	TV Mini-series	Story of Australia II winning the 1983 America's Cup
Yachting	Kay Cottee : First Lady	1989	Documentary	The story of Kay Cottee, the first woman in history to sail solo, non-stop and unassisted around the world.
Yachting	Lionheart : the Jesse Martin story	2001	Documentary	In 1991, Jesse Martin b circumnavigating the world in his 34-foot yacht, Lionheart became the youngest person in history to sail around the world solo, non stop and unassisted.
Yachting	210 days: around the world with Jessica Watson	2010	Documentary	In May 2010, 16 year old young Australian Jessica Watson sailed into Sydney Harbour and became the youngest person to sail solo, non-stop and unassisted around the world.
