= Patineur Grotesque =

1896 comedy film directed by Marius Sestier

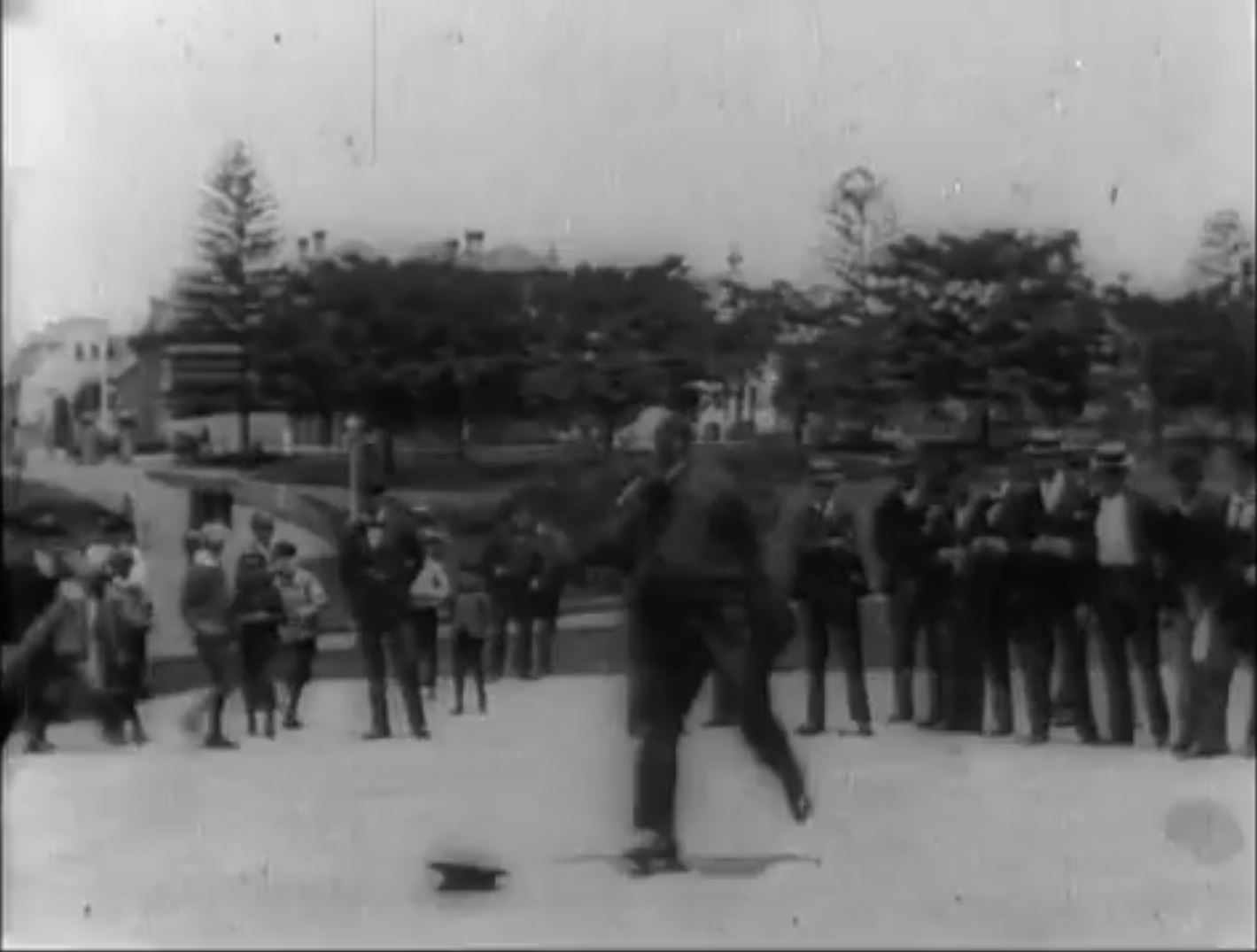
- Frame from the film Patineur Grotesque
- Cinematography: Marius Sestier
- Production company: Lumière Brothers
- Distributed by: Lumière Brothers
- Release date: 28 March 1897 (Lyon)
- Country: Colony of New South Wales (Australia)
- Language: Silent

Patineur Grotesque (1896)

Patineur Grotesque was a one-minute film of a comic roller-skater.

It featured "a bearded man in street clothes, smoking an outsize cigar... rollerskating in a park, watched by a crowd. He loses his hat and tumbles over clownishly when he tries to retrieve it. Jamming it back on his head, he gains his feet and moons his audience with a series of bows that reveal a white hand printed on his trousers, as if it’s gripping his buttocks. His finale is a dizzying series of spins – over 20 in a row – that show him to be an athletic performer dressed as a staid middle-aged man."

Marius Sestier filmed the comic act in Prince Alfred Park in the South Sydney-Redfern area in 1896. The film was not released until 1897 in Lyon, France. The film was listed in the original Lumière Brothers catalogue as Lumière N°117 and N°73 in a newer catalogue.

Sestier together with Henry Walter Barnett had made approximately 19 films in Sydney and Melbourne between October and November 1896, these being the very first films recorded in Australia.

The film wouldn't be shown in Australia until 17 March 2010, where it was shown as a Sestier tribute by Canberra's Arc Cinema.
