= New South Wales Horse Artillery in Action =

1896 documentary film directed by Marius Sestier

- Based on: documentary
- Cinematography: Marius Sestier
- Production company: Lumière Brothers
- Distributed by: Lumière Brothers
- Release date: 24 November 1896 (Sydney)
- Country: Australia
- Language: Silent

New South Wales Horse Artillery in Action was a short documentary film.

Marius Sestier made two films of the New South Wales Horse Artillery drill at Victoria Barracks, Sydney.

Sestier together with Henry Walter Barnett had made approximately 19 films in Sydney and Melbourne between October and November 1896, these being the very first films recorded in Australia.
