= Newhaven (horse) =

Australian-bred Thoroughbred racehorse

- Sire: Newminster (AU)
- Grandsire: The Marquis (GB)
- Dam: Oceana (AU)
- Damsire: St Albans (GB)
- Sex: Stallion
- Foaled: 1893
- Country: Australia
- Colour: Chestnut
- Breeder: W R Wilson
- Owner: W T Jones; William Cooper
- Trainer: Walter Hickenbotham (AU); Tom Jennings Jnr (UK)
- Record: 26:15-4-2 (AU); 13:4-2-2 (UK)

Major wins
- Maribyrnong Plate (1895); AJC Spring Stakes (1896); Craven Plate (1896); Ascot Vale Stakes (1896); Victoria Derby (1896); Melbourne Cup (1896); AJC St Leger (1897); AJC Plate (1897); Newmarket March Stakes (1898); City and Suburban Handicap (1899); Newmarket March Stakes (1899); Epsom Gold Cup (1899)
- Last updated on 23 October 2020

Newhaven (Newhaven II in England) was an Australian bred Thoroughbred racehorse who won the 1896 Victoria Derby and the 1896 Melbourne Cup carrying a record weight for a 3 year old of 7st.13lb by 6 lengths.

Marius Sestier filmed Lady Brassey placing the Blue Ribbon on Newhaven when Newhaven won the Victoria Derby.

Sestier filmed Newhaven winning the 1896 Melbourne Cup, the first time the cup was filmed.

Newhaven finished his racing days in England as Newhaven II. He won 4 races including the rich City and Suburban Handicap and the Epsom Gold Cup. When retired to stud he was excluded from the studbook due to doubts about the breeding of his ancestor Musidora (2nd Melbourne Cup 1863).
