= Harry Edwards (sociologist) =

American sociologist and civil rights activist

Dr. Harry Edwards
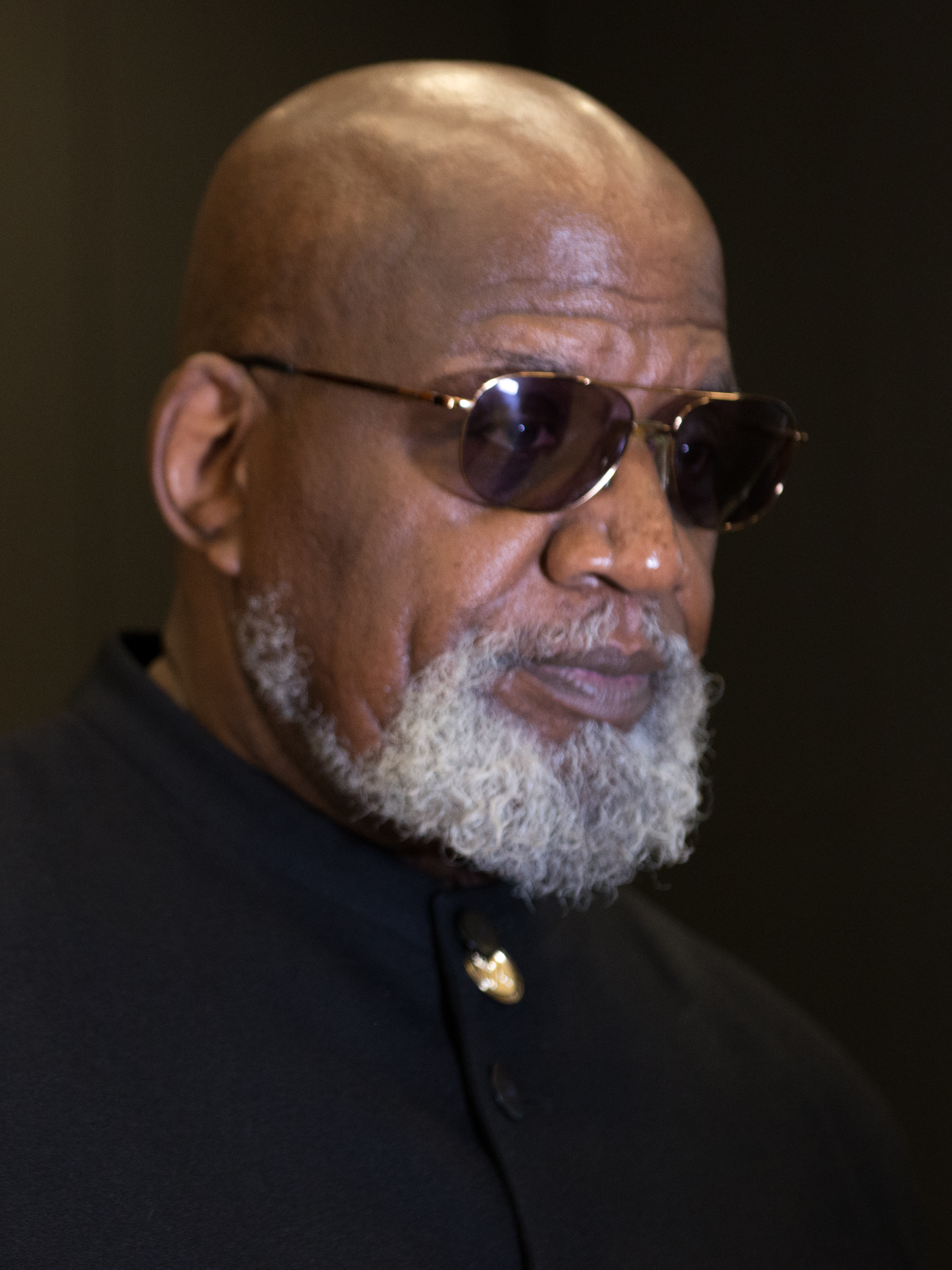
- Edwards in 2014
- Born: Harry Edwards; November 22, 1942 (age 83); East St. Louis, Illinois, U.S. (Note: Some sources say St. Louis, Missouri.)
- Education: Fresno City College; San Jose State University (BA); Cornell University (PhD)
- Spouse: Sandra Y. Boze (m. 1970)
- Awards: Woodrow Wilson Fellowship
- Scientific career
- Fields: Sociology
- Workplaces: University of California, Berkeley

Harry Thomas Edwards (born November 22, 1942) is an American sociologist and civil rights activist. After working as an assistant professor of sociology at San Jose State College, he completed his Ph.D. at Cornell University and is Professor Emeritus of Sociology at the University of California, Berkeley. Edwards' career has focused on the experiences of African-American athletes. He is widely regarded as the father of the field of sociology of sport, and is considered a leading authority on its intersection with diversity.

== Career ==
Edwards' career has focused on the experiences of African-American athletes and he is a strong advocate of black participation in the management of professional sports. He has served as a staff consultant to the San Francisco 49ers football team and to the Golden State Warriors basketball team. He has also been involved in recruiting black talent for front-office positions in Major League Baseball.

Author of The Revolt of the Black Athlete, Edwards was the architect of the Olympic Project for Human Rights, which led to the Black Power Salute protest by two African-American athletes, Tommie Smith and John Carlos, both San José State University athletes, at the 1968 Summer Olympics in Mexico City. Years earlier, Edwards had been a discus thrower on the San Jose State track team. In early 1968, at a speech given at Cornell University, Edwards spoke publicly in favor of a boycott by black athletes of the 1968 Summer Olympic Games in Mexico City.

The New York Times Magazine wrote that Edwards "has seen himself as one who provokes and incites others to action, a reformer, not a revolutionary. And indeed, no other single figure in sports has done as much to make the country aware that the problems of the larger culture are recapitulated in sports, that the arena is no sanctuary from drugs, racism and corruption."

Edwards told Time magazine that he "wants to serve as a role model—the promising athlete who gave up the possibility of a career in professional sports to become a scholar instead." "We must teach our children to dream with their eyes open," he said. "The chances of your becoming a Jerry Rice or a Magic Johnson are so slim as to be negligible. Black kids must learn to distribute their energies in a way that's going to make them productive, contributing citizens in an increasingly high-technology society."

In 2014, the University of Texas at Austin established a lecture forum in Edwards' name, the "Dr. Harry Edwards Lectures on Sport and Society". However, in 2016, Edwards rescinded all association and affiliation with the lecture forum as a result of the implementation of the State of Texas "campus concealed carry law" at the university.

Edwards is a commentator in 2016 documentary miniseries O.J.: Made in America. He also made a cameo appearance as himself in the 2019 film High Flying Bird. He also appeared in the documentary The Stand: How One Gesture Shook the World about the protest by Carlos and Smith at the 1968 Summer Olympics.

== Publications ==
- Black Students. New York: Free Press. 1970. ISBN 978-0-02-909020-6. LCCN 79116809.
- Sociology of Sport. Homewood, Illinois: Dorsey Press. 1973. ISBN 0256014159. LCCN 72095401.
- The Struggle That Must Be: an autobiography. New York: Macmillan. 1980. ISBN 0025350404. LCCN 80021034.
- Playing to Win: A Short Guide to Sensible Black Sports Participation. Berkeley, California: Institute for the Study of Social Change. 1982.
- The Revolt of the Black Athlete. With a foreword by Samuel J. Skinner, Jr. Ontario: Collier-Macmillan Limited. 1985. LCCN 70085475.

In addition to articles and essays in Sports Illustrated and Psychology Today, Edwards has written the following:

- "For Blacks, a Life in Sports Is No Different From Life: A Reflection of Society A Threat to Survival 'Sporting Chance' Disputed Only the Best Are Kept Neglect of Other Pursuits". The New York Times (sports). May 6, 1979. ISSN 0362-4331. ProQuest document ID 120866836ProQuest 111167040. ProQuest Historical Newspapers: The New York Times (1851–2008) (subscription required)
- "Educating black athletes". Atlantic Monthly, August 1983, 253(2).
- "Black student-athletes: taking responsibility". California Living, 1984; reprinted in Representative American Speeches. W. W. Wilson Co., 1984.
- "Perpetuating Illusions". The New York Times, THE WEEK IN REVIEW. May 19, 1985. p. E22. ISSN 0362-4331. ProQuest document ID 111167040ProQuest 111167040. ProQuest Historical Newspapers: The New York Times (1851–2008) (subscription required)
