= Passengers Alighting from Ferry Brighton at Manly =

1896 documentary film directed by Marius Sestier

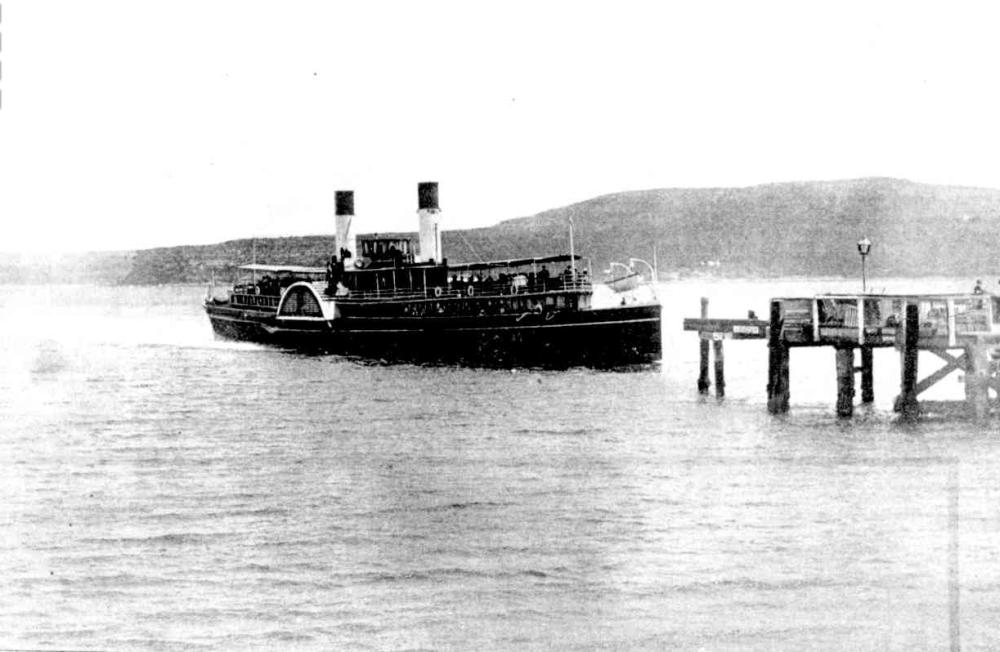
- Photograph of PS Brighton arriving at Manly wharf
- Based on: documentary
- Cinematography: Marius Sestier
- Production company: Lumière Brothers
- Release date: 27 October 1896 (Sydney)
- Country: Australia
- Language: Silent

Passengers Alighting from Ferry Brighton at Manly is an 1896 film by Marius Sestier of passengers alighting from the paddle steamer ferry Brighton at Manly Wharf in Sydney. It is the first film ever shot and screened in Australia. Sestier and Henry Walter Barnett made approximately 19 films in Sydney and Melbourne between October and November 1896, of which this was the earliest.

The film premiered on 27 October 1896 at the Salon Lumière on Sydney's Pitt Street, Australia's first cinema, founded by Sestier and Barnett. No copy is known to have survived.
