= 1896 Melbourne Cup =

- Melbourne Cup
- Location: Flemington Racecourse
- Date: 3 November 1896
- Distance: 2 miles
- Winning horse: Newhaven
- Winning time: 3:28.50
- Final odds: 4/1
- Jockey: H. J. Gardiner
- Trainer: Walter Hickenbotham
- Owner: W T Jones; William Cooper
- Surface: Turf

External videos
- Melbourne Cup 1896 NFSA

The 1896 Melbourne Cup was a two-mile handicap horse race which took place on Tuesday, 3 November 1896.

Marius Sestier filmed the Melbourne Cup. The feature, which consisted of 10 one-minute films shown in chronological order, was premiered at the Princess Theatre, Melbourne on 19 November 1896.

The placegetters were:

Place	Name	Jockey
1	Newhaven	H. J. Gardiner
2	Bloodshot	E. Power
3	The Skipper	W. Delaney

== See also ==
- Melbourne Cup
- List of Melbourne Cup winners
- Victoria Racing Club
