= Epsom Gold Cup =

English Thoroughbred horse race

The Epsom Gold Cup was an English Thoroughbred horse race run annually at Epsom Downs Racecourse in Epsom, Surrey.

Raced in late May, it was open to horses age three and older. During the latter part of the 19th century, the race offered a purse of five hundred sovereigns in plate or specie and attracted top horses of the era.

It was superseded by the Coronation Cup in 1902.

== Winners (partial list) ==
- 1810 - Tutelina
- 1811 - Marmion
- 1812 - Sorcery
- 1813 - Octavius
- 1814 - Aquarius
- 1825 - Wings
- 1827 - Tom Tit
- 1833 - Languish
- 1854 - Kingston ^{[a]}
- 1855 - Rataplan ^{[a]}
- 1856 - Typee ^{[a]}
- 1857 - Sir Colin ^{[a]}
- 1858 - Fisherman ^{[a]}
- 1859 - Fisherman ^{[a]}
- 1860 - Newcastle ^{[a]} ^{[b]}
- 1861 - Surprise ^{[a]} ^{[b]}
- 1862 - Asteroid ^{[a]}
- 1878 - Hampton
- 1879 - Parole
- 1880 - Fashion
- 1881 - Bend Or
- 1882 - Tristan
- 1883 - Tristan
- 1884 - St. Simon
- 1893 - Curio
- 1898 - Bay Ronald
- 1899 - Newhaven II

^{a} Race known as Epsom Cup.
^{b} Run over Great Metropolitan Handicap course - 2 miles 2 furlongs (3,621 metres).
