= The Melbourne Cup (1896 film) =

1896 documentary film directed by Marius Sestier

- Directed by: Henry Walter Barnett
- Cinematography: Marius Sestier
- Production company: Lumière Brothers
- Release date: 19 November 1896 (Melbourne)
- Country: Colony of Victoria (Australia)
- Language: Silent

External media

Images
- Arrival of a train, Hill Platform. (Catalogue Lumière)
- The Arrival of his Excellency the Governor. (Catalogue Lumière)
- Newhaven, his trainer, W. Hickenbotham, and jockey, Gardiner. (Catalogue Lumière)
- Weighing-out for the Cup. (Catalogue Lumière)

Video
- The Crowd near the grandstand. NFSA
- Horses in the Saddling Paddock. NFSA
- Melbourne Cup 1896. NFSA

The Melbourne Cup was a film about the two mile horse race won by Newhaven which took place on Tuesday, 3 November 1896.

Marius Sestier filmed the 1896 Melbourne Cup horse race, being in a series of films about the Melbourne Cup Carnival. The feature, which consisted of 10 one-minute films shown in chronological order, was premiered at the Princess Theatre, Melbourne on 19 November 1896.

One or more of the films was actually shot on Derby Day, Saturday, 31 October 1896, when Newhaven won the Victoria Derby.

It has been acclaimed as the main part of Australia’s first locally produced and successfully screened cinema program.

== Synopsis ==
Arrival of Train at the Hill platform on the Flemington Racecourse railway station. Crowds on the Lawn near the Grandstand. The arrival of the Governor Lord Brassey. Horses in the Saddling Paddock. Finish of the Cup Day Hurdle Race. Weighing-out for the Cup. The race finish. Lady Brassey placing the Blue Ribbon on Newhaven (this was reported on the Saturday when Newhaven won the Victoria Derby). Afternoon Tea under the Awning. Newhaven with his trainer W. Hickenbotham, and Jockey H. J. Gardiner.

== List of the Melbourne Cup Carnival film reels ==
1. Arrival of race goers at the Hill platform on the Flemington Racecourse railway station
2. The lawn near the band stand
3. The Arrival of his Excellency the Governor
4. Horses in the Saddling Paddock
5. Lady Brassey placing the Blue Ribbon on Newhaven
6. Finish of the Cup Day Hurdle Race
7. Weighing-out for the Cup
8. The Melbourne Cup, the race finish
9. Near the grandstand
10. Afternoon Tea under the Awning
11. Newhaven with his trainer W. Hickenbotham, and Jockey H. J. Gardiner
