= Salute (2008 film) =

2008 documentary film by Matt Norman

- Directed by: Matt Norman
- Written by: Matt Norman
- Produced by: Matt Norman
- Starring: Peter Norman; Tommie Smith; John Carlos
- Cinematography: Marty Smith
- Edited by: John Leonard; Jane Moran
- Music by: David Hirschfelder
- Production companies: Wingman Pictures; Wingman Pictures International; The Actors Cafe; Instinct Entertainment
- Distributed by: Paramount Pictures; Wingman Pictures; Transmission
- Release date: 17 July 2008 (Australia)
- Country: Australia
- Language: English
- Budget: AU$2 million

Salute (occasionally known as Salute: The Peter Norman Story) is a 2008 Australian sports documentary film directed, produced and written by Matt Norman. It tells the role of Peter Norman, Norman's uncle, in a defining moment of the American civil rights movement: the 1968 Olympics Black Power salute.

== Synopsis ==
The film provides an insight into an incident at the 1968 Summer Olympics which saw two United States athletes, Tommie Smith and John Carlos, give the black power salute from the victory dais after the 200 metres final. The film focuses on the third man on the dais, silver medal winner Peter Norman, who showed his support for Smith and Carlos by donning an "Olympic Project for Human Rights" (OPHR) badge on his way to the podium. It was also Norman who suggested to Smith and Carlos that they share the black gloves used in their salute, after Carlos had left his gloves in the Olympic Village. This is the reason for Smith raising his right fist, while Carlos raised his left. Asked later about his support of Smith and Carlos' cause by the world's press, Norman said he opposed his country's government's White Australia policy.

The film documents the subsequent reprimand of Norman by the Australian Olympic authorities, and his ostracism by the Australian media. Despite Norman running qualifying times for both the 100m and 200m during 1971/72, the Australian Olympic track team did not send him to the 1972 Summer Olympics in Munich. It also documents Norman's reunion with Smith and Carlos, shortly before his death in 2006.

The film debuted at the Sydney Film Festival on 8 June 2008. It was released Australia-wide on 17 July 2008.

== Cast ==
- Peter Norman as himself
- Tommie Smith as himself
- John Carlos as himself

== Background ==
While there had been attempts by American filmmakers to put together a piece on the event, these earlier films had overlooked the actions of Peter Norman. As a result, Matt Norman realised that the full story of his famous uncle had never been told and began filming Salute at the end of 2002.

With the help of the Film Finance Corporation and his local funding body Film Victoria, Norman raised close to two million dollars for post production of the film.

In 2008, Andrew Mackie and Richard Payton of Transmission Films were signed on as Australian distributors and later brought on board Paramount Pictures Australia to release the film nationally in cinemas throughout Australia.

== Awards ==
- 2009 – Won - Atlanta International Documentary Film Festival (aka Atlanta DocuFest): Best Social Documentary
- 2009 – Won - Santa Cruz Film Festival: Jury Award – Best Documentary Feature
- 2009 – Nominated - Film Critics Circle of Australia Awards: FCCA Award - Best Feature Documentary
- 2008 – Won - Sydney Film Festival: Audience Award - Best Australian Documentary
- 2008 – Won - Rhode Island Film Festival: Audience Award – Best Documentary

== Box office ==
Salute grossed $233,411 at the box office in Australia.

== See also ==
- List of films about the sport of athletics
- List of Australian sports films
