= Henry Walter Barnett =

Australian photographer and filmmaker (1862–1934)

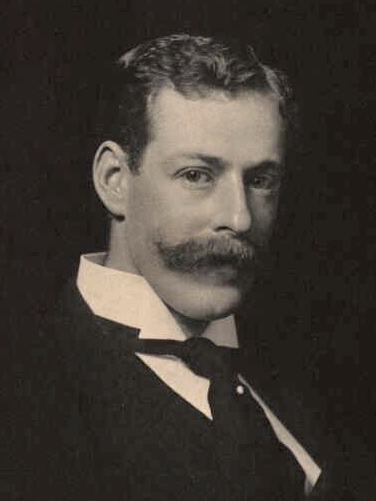
- Barnett circa 1894
- Born: Henry Walter Barnett; 25 January 1862; St Kilda, Melbourne, Australia
- Died: 16 January 1934 (aged 71); Nice, France
- Other name: H. Walter Barnett
- Occupation: Photographer

Henry Walter Barnett (25 January 1862 – 16 January 1934), usually known as H. Walter Barnett, was an Australian photographer and filmmaker. Barnett was a prominent portrait photographer of the late 19th and early 20th centuries, establishing the successful Falk studios in Sydney. Later in his career he was based in London, England, with studios at Hyde Park Corner and Knightsbridge. Barnett became involved in filmmaking after meeting cinematographer Marius Sestier in 1896, and with Sestier made some of the first films shot in Australia.

== Life and career ==
Barnett was born on 25 January 1862 in St Kilda, Melbourne, Australia, one of seven children of English-born Jewish parents Lewis (Note: Oxford Dictionary of National Biography quotes his father's name as Louis.) Barnett, a merchant, and his wife Alice Jacobs. He left school at the age of 13 and began his photographic career as a studio assistant, later establishing a studio in Hobart, Tasmania with his business partner Harold Riise. In 1884 he sold his share of the Hobart studio, after which he travelled and worked variously in London and the United States. During his time in London he was employed by the society photographers W. & D. Downey, where he assisted in photographing the future King Edward VII.

In 1885 Barnett founded the Falk studios in Sydney, at which he established himself as one of Australia's leading portrait photographers. He opened a second studio in Melbourne in 1895. He was known in particular for photographing stage stars and other celebrities; one of his best-known sitters was Sarah Bernhardt, who sat for him while visiting Australia in 1891. Other prominent visitors to Australia photographed by Barnett were Robert Louis Stevenson in 1893 and Mark Twain in 1896. One of his most notable works was a photograph of Henry Parkes, in which according to Ennis (2004), Parkes "plays the role of a wise old man whose intense expression is evocative of a seer's". Barnett married Hilda "Ella" Frances Clement Forbes in 1889.

In 1897 Barnett relocated to London and established a photography studio at Hyde Park Corner, later adding a second studio in Knightsbridge. He joined photographic society The Linked Ring in 1899, was a founder member of the Professional Photographers Association (later the British Institute of Professional Photography) in 1901, and was elected to the Royal Photographic Society council in 1903. In 1904 he published a collection of photographs of his most notable sitters, titled A List of Well Known People Photographed by H. Walter Barnett. He exhibited a collection of photographs of British Armed Forces personnel of World War I in 1917, titled Warriors All.

Barnett sold his London studios in 1920 and moved to Dieppe, France, where he maintained a keen interest in contemporary French art. He died in Nice on 16 January 1934, aged 71.

== Film production ==
In 1896 Barnett met French cinematographer Marius Sestier, an agent of early filmmakers the Lumière brothers assigned to demonstrate their cinématographe abroad. Barnett and Sestier began making films together, starting with a short film of passengers Alighting from Ferry Brighton at Manly, which was the first film shot and screened in Australia.

They made approximately 19 films together in Sydney and Melbourne, most notably a series of about ten to fifteen films documenting the 1896 Melbourne Cup Carnival, including a film of the 1896 Melbourne Cup horse race. Barnett directed the films while Sestier operated the cinématographe, and in the Melbourne Cup film Barnett is seen on camera encouraging spectators to wave their hats as the horses cross the finish line. The Melbourne Cup film was premiered at the Princess Theatre, Melbourne on 19 November 1896. It was covered in the Australian press, including The Age and The Bulletin, and has been cited as Australia's first film production.

In 1897 Barnett's company produced four films of the English cricket team in Australia in 1897–98. These including one of the earliest surviving cricket films, featuring Prince Ranjitsinhji Practising Batting in the Nets.

== Gallery ==
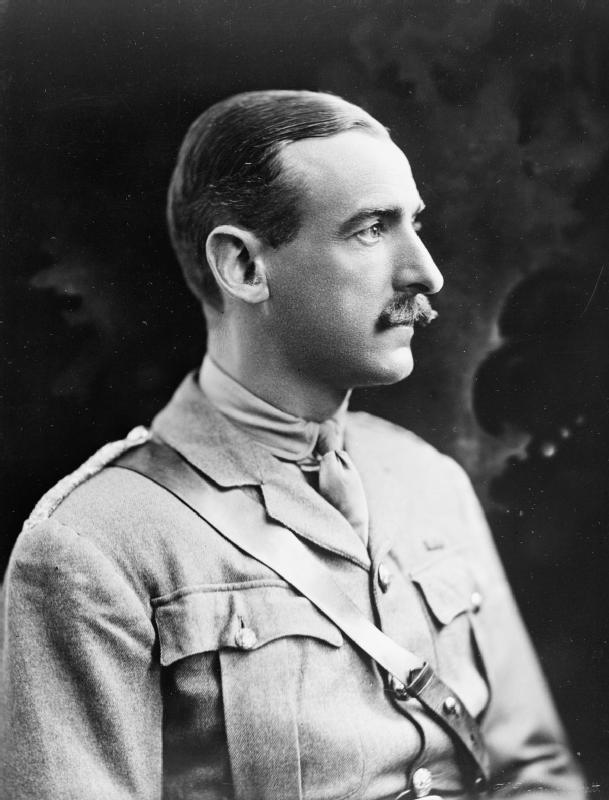
Adrian Carton de Wiart

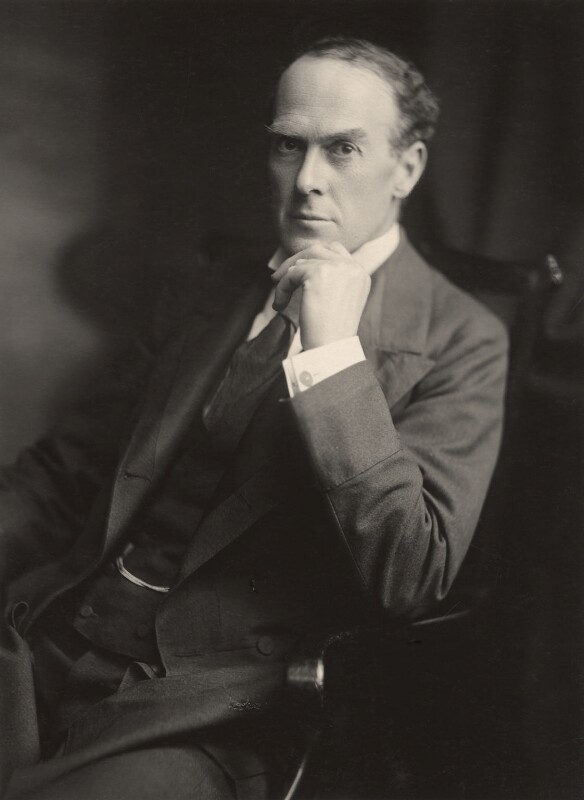
Alfred Lyttelton

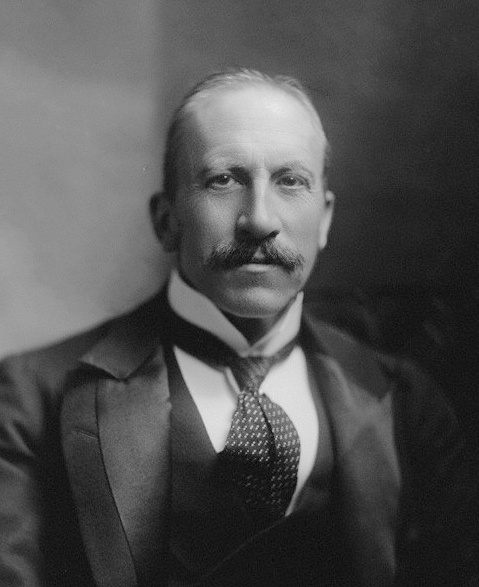
Alfred Milner, 1st Viscount Milner

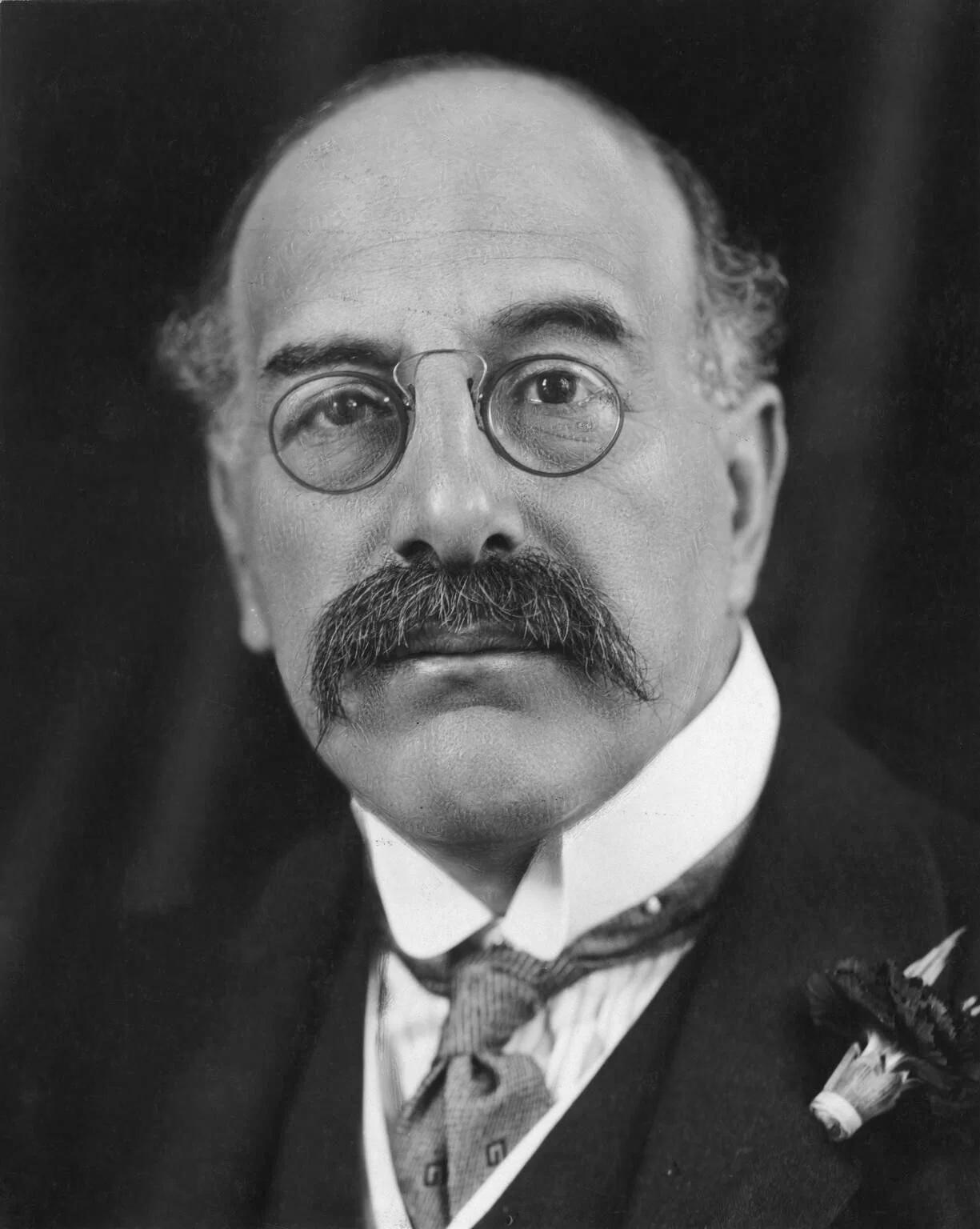
Alfred Mond, 1st Baron Melchett

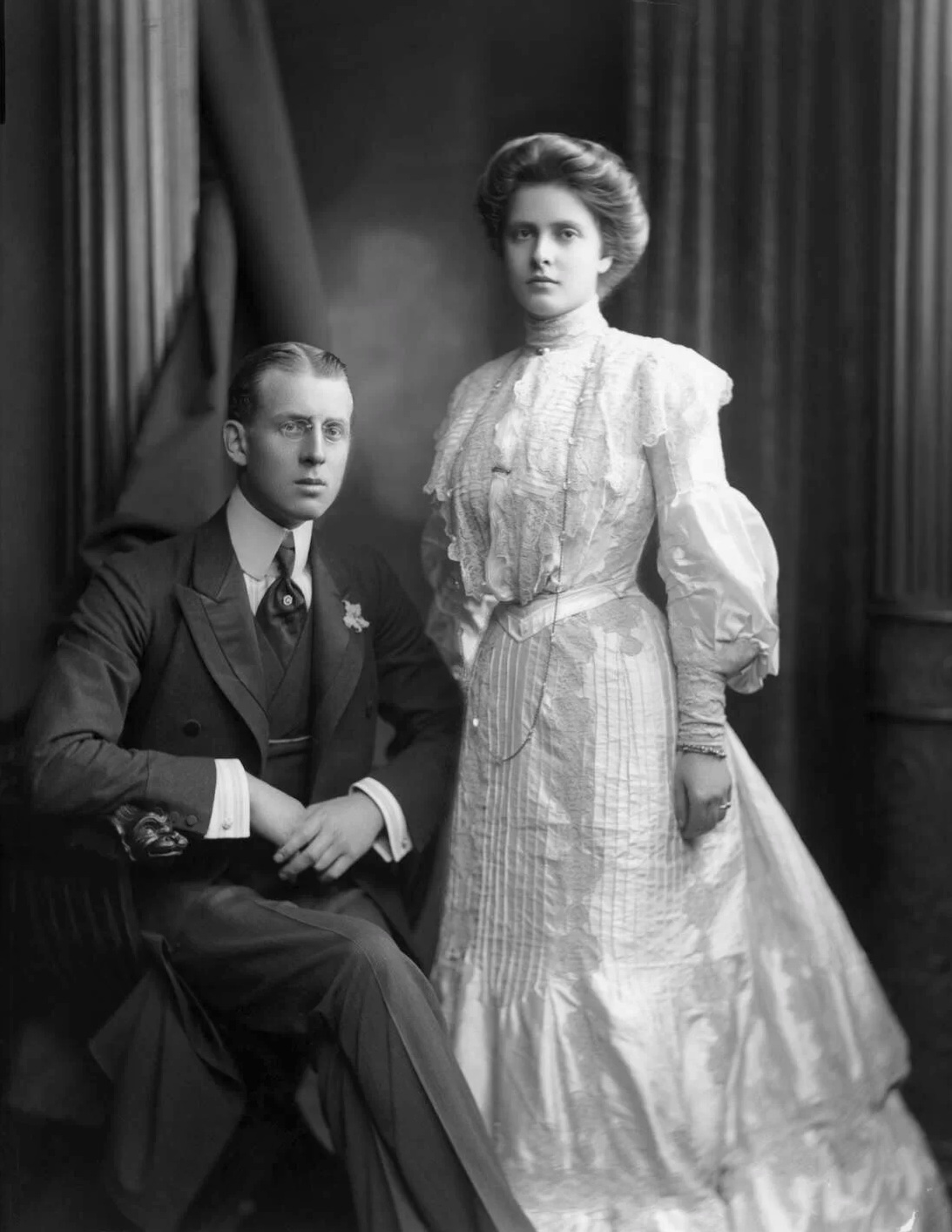
Prince Andrew of Greece and Denmark and Princess Alice of Battenberg

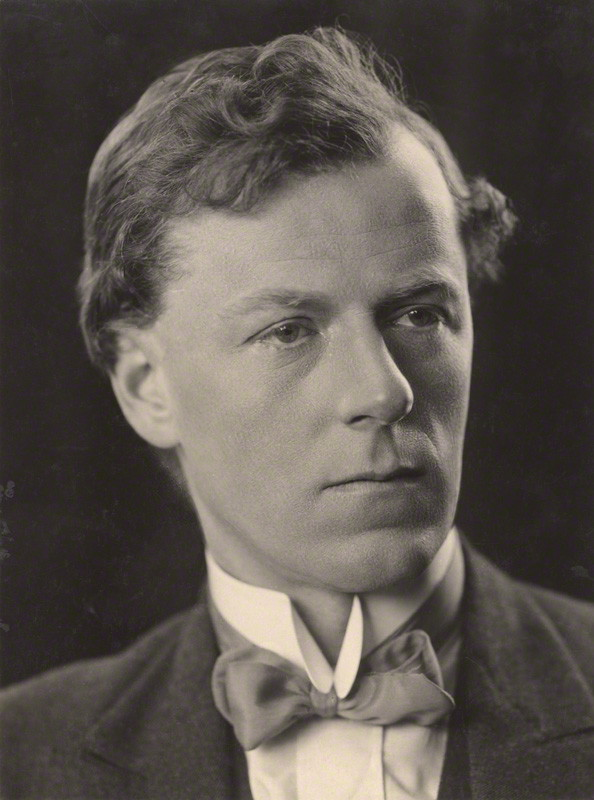
Arthur Comyns Carr

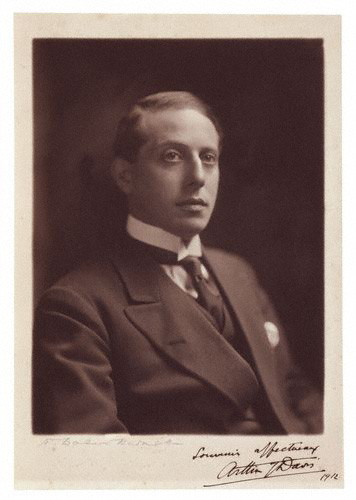
Arthur Joseph Davis

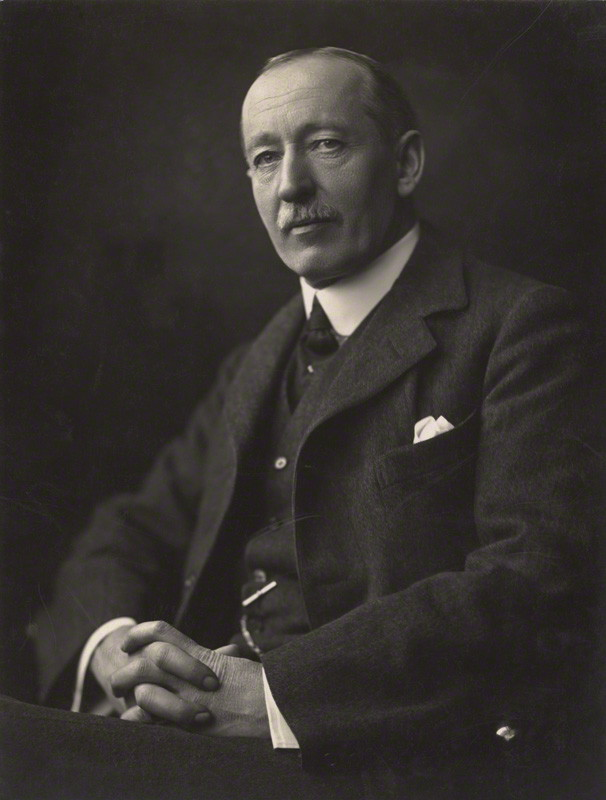
Arthur Stockdale Cope

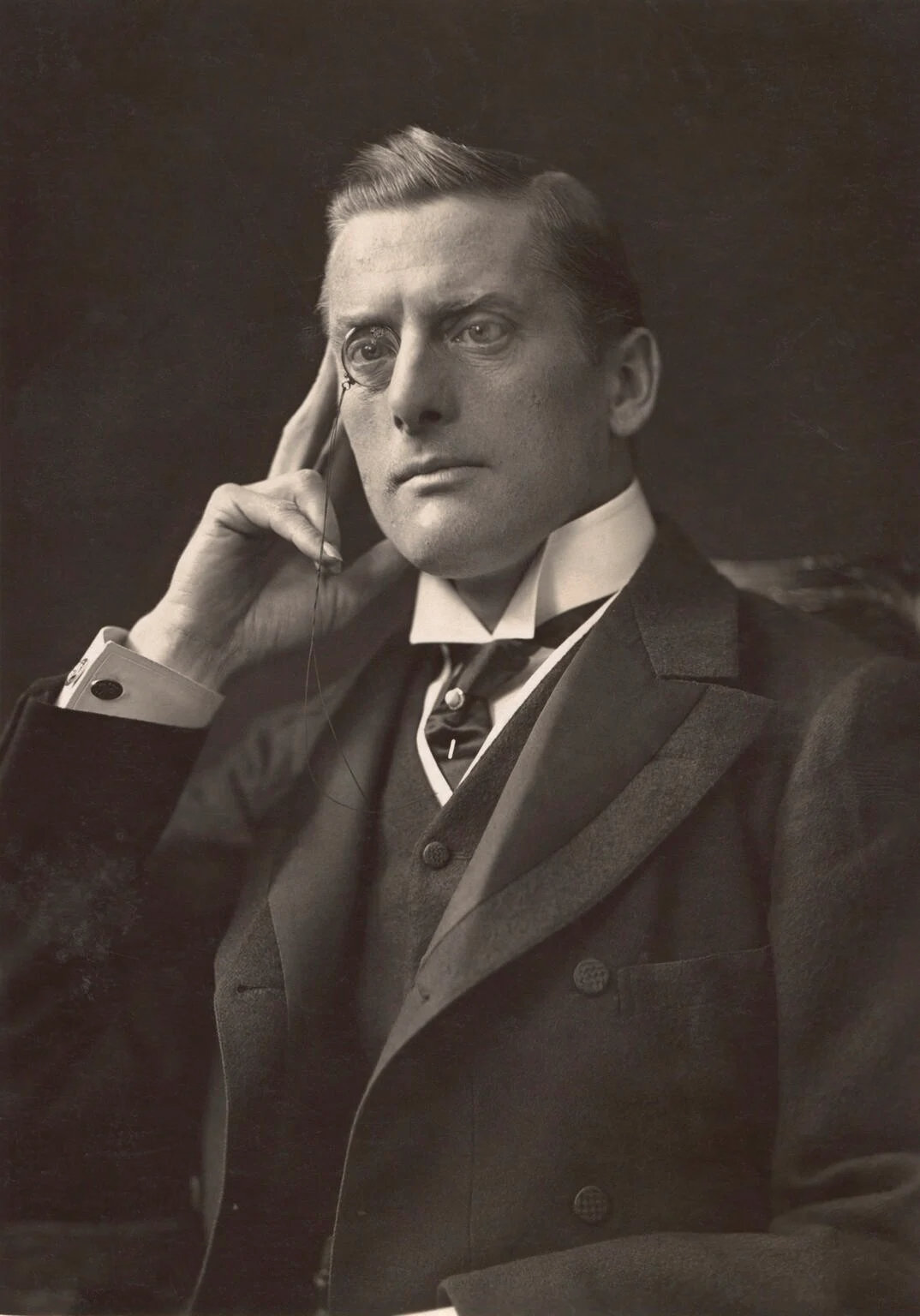
Austen Chamberlain

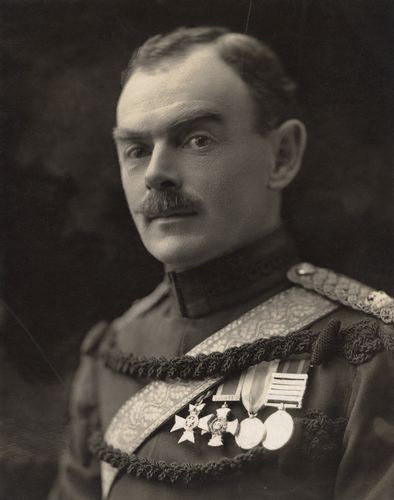
Charles Gordon-Lennox, 8th Duke of Richmond

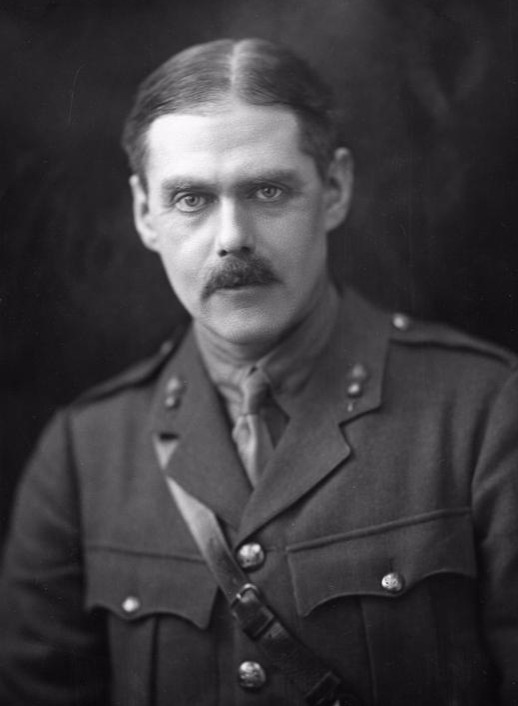
Charles Henry Lyell

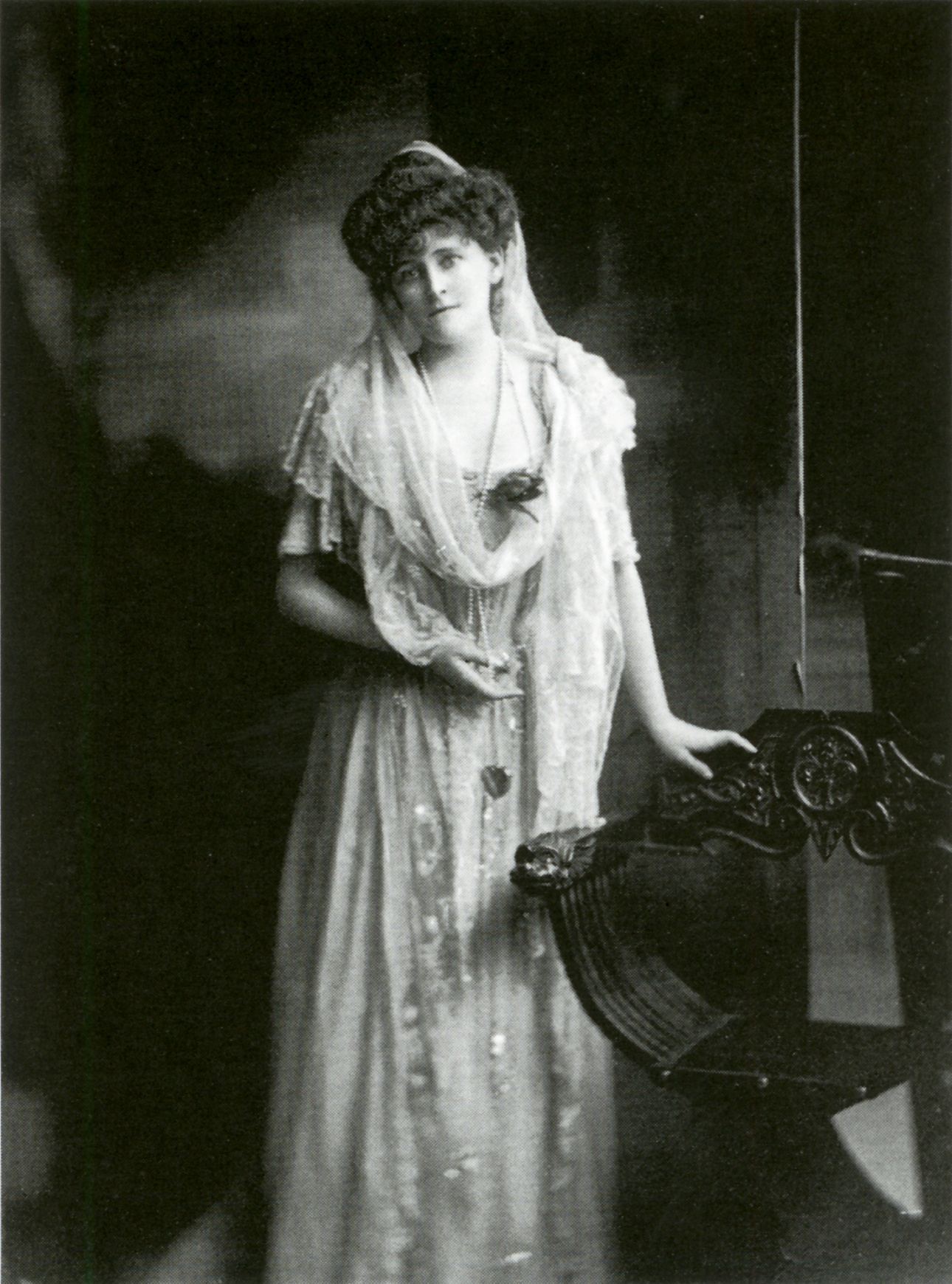
Daisy Greville, Countess of Warwick

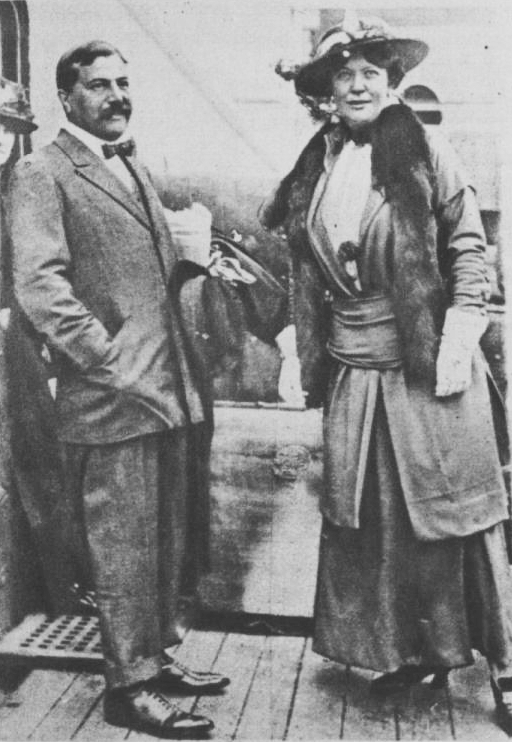
Edgar Speyer and Leonora Speyer

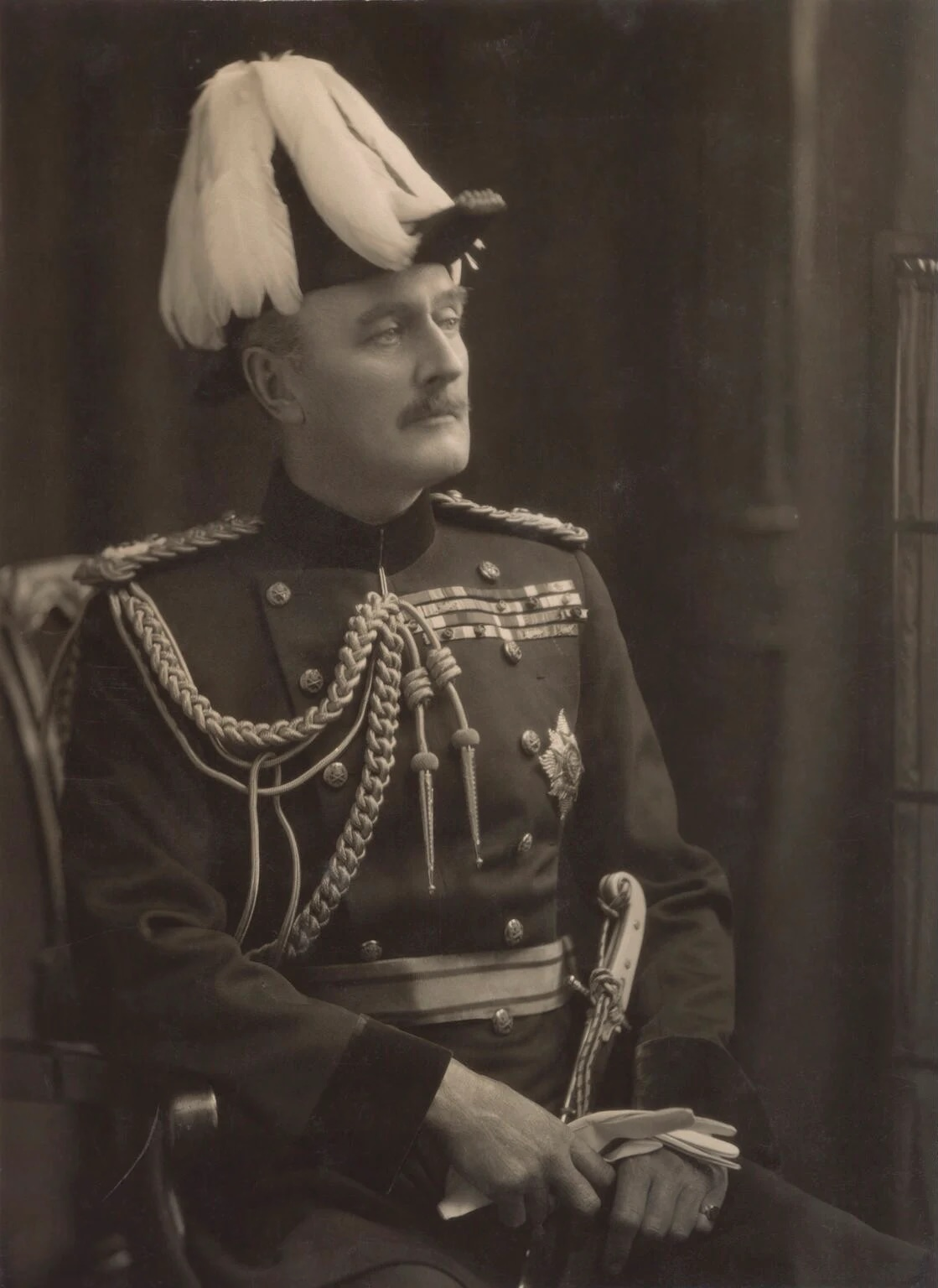
Edmund Allenby, 1st Viscount Allenby

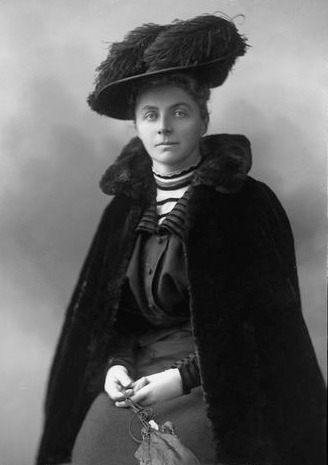
Emily Hobhouse

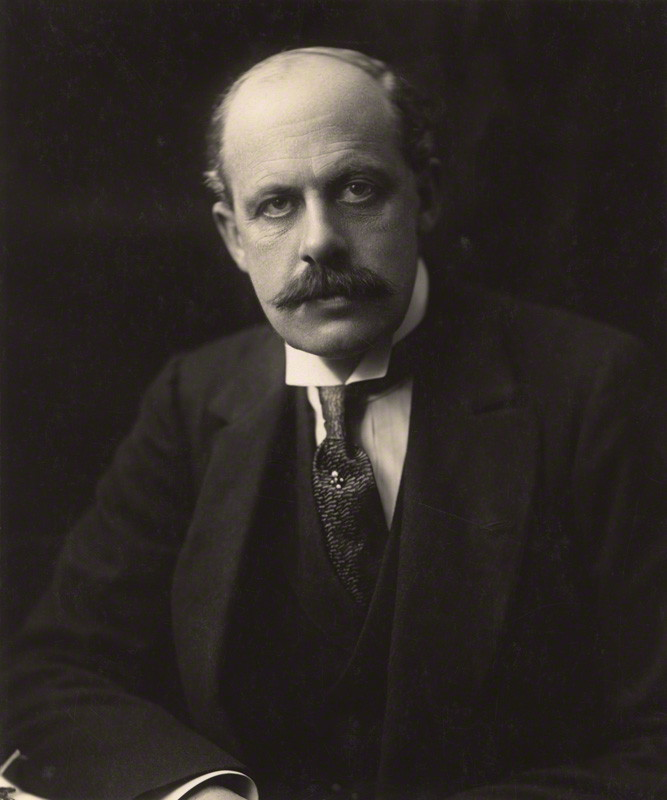
Eric Hambro

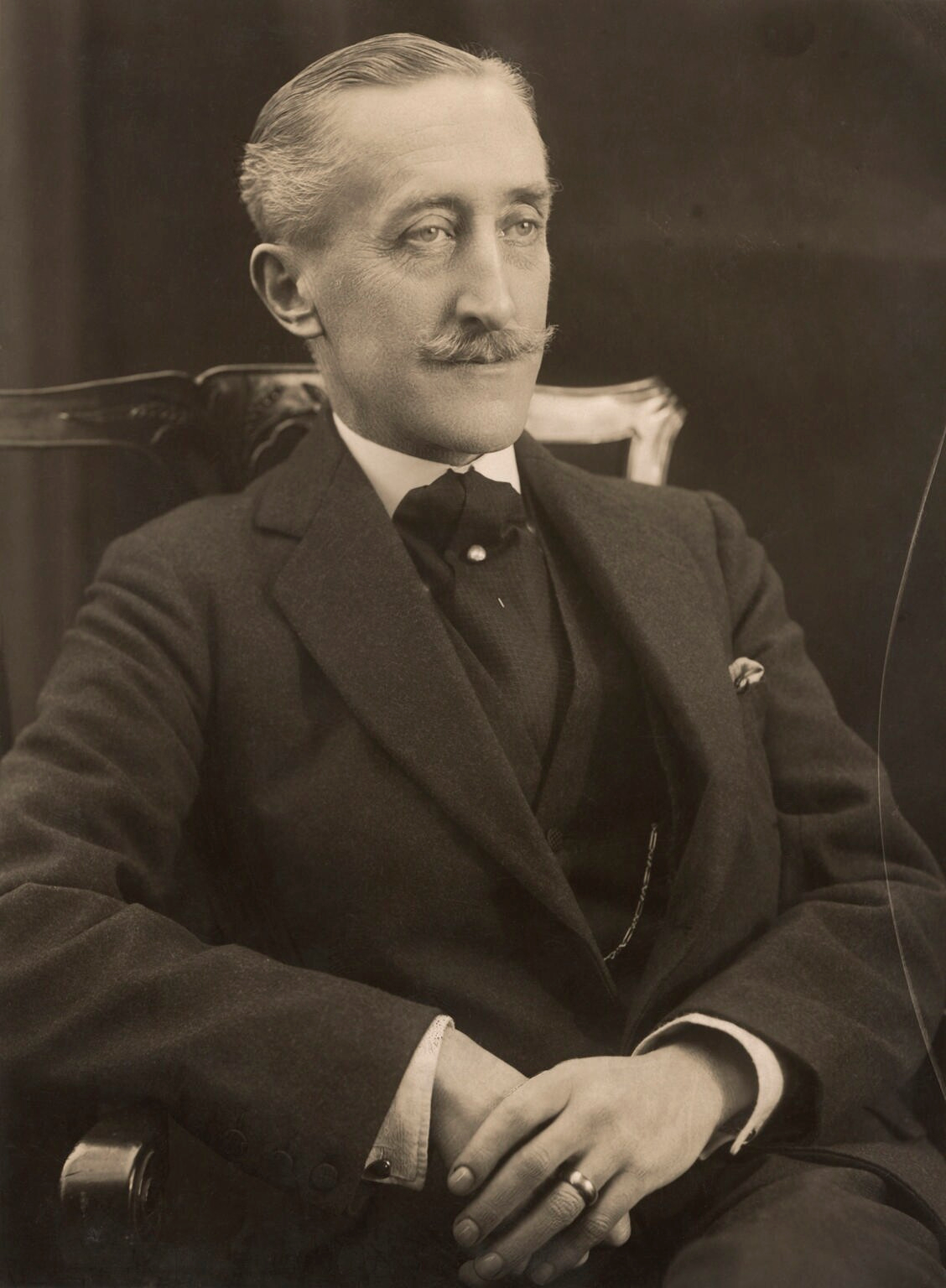
Freeman Freeman-Thomas, 1st Marquess of Willingdon

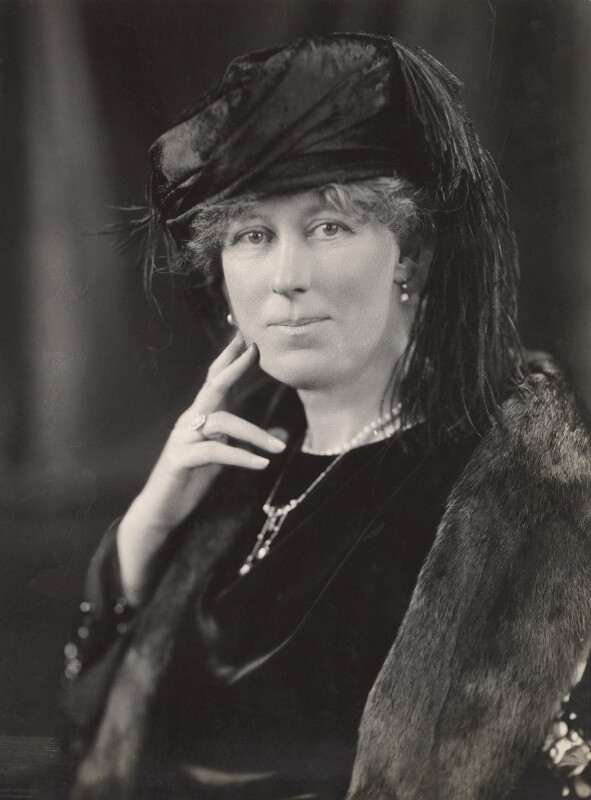
Frances Thesiger, Viscountess Chelmsford

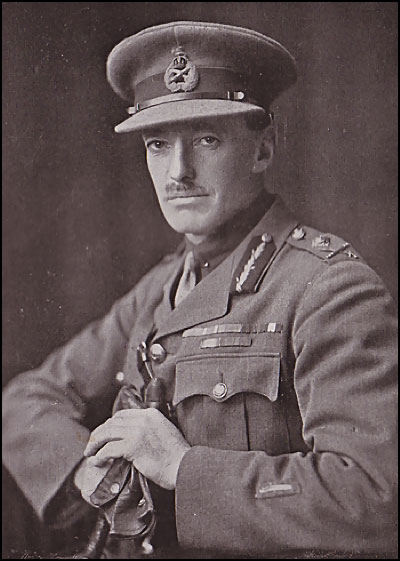
Gerald Boyd

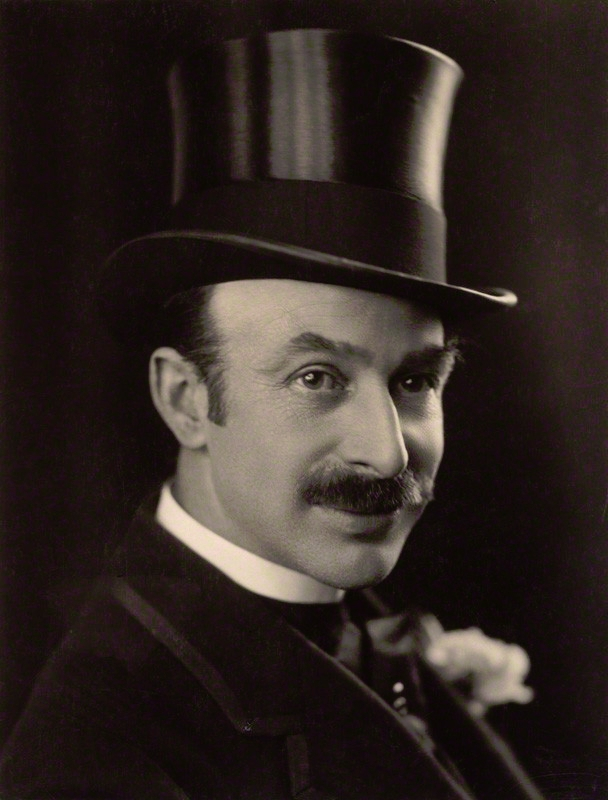
Garrard Tyrwhitt-Drake

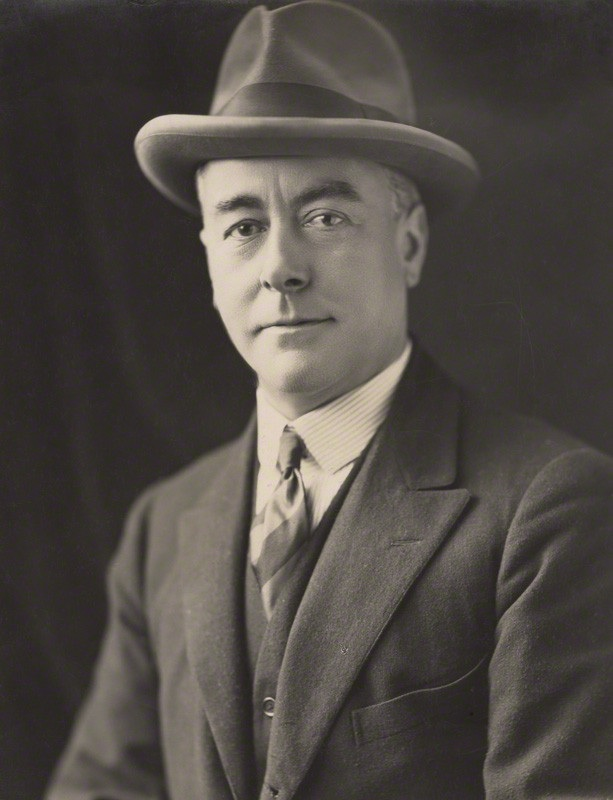
George Robey

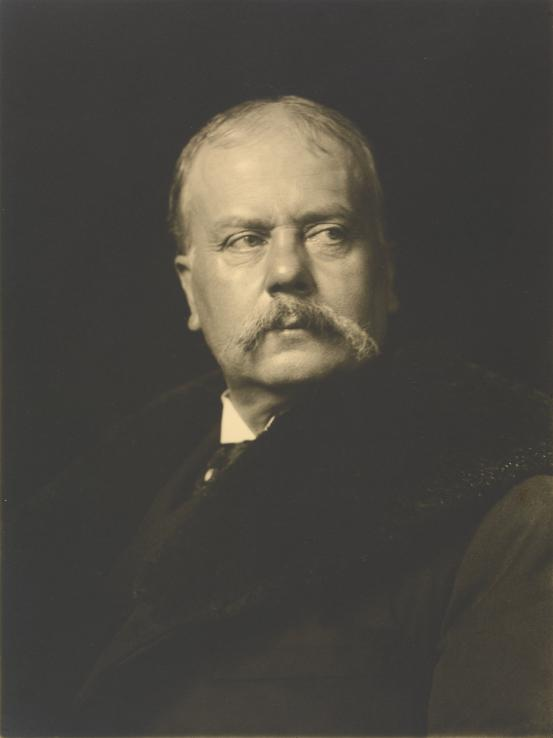
Henri Kowalski

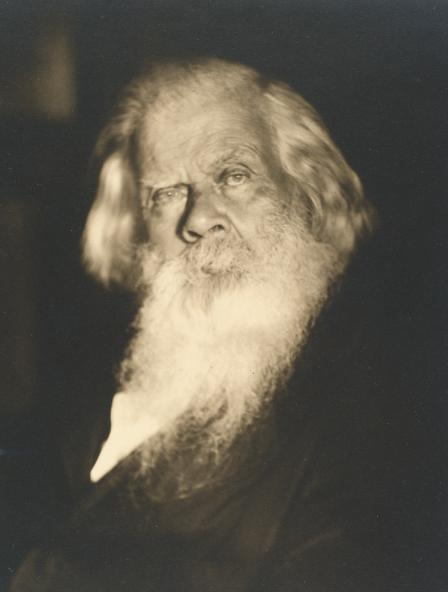
Henry Parkes

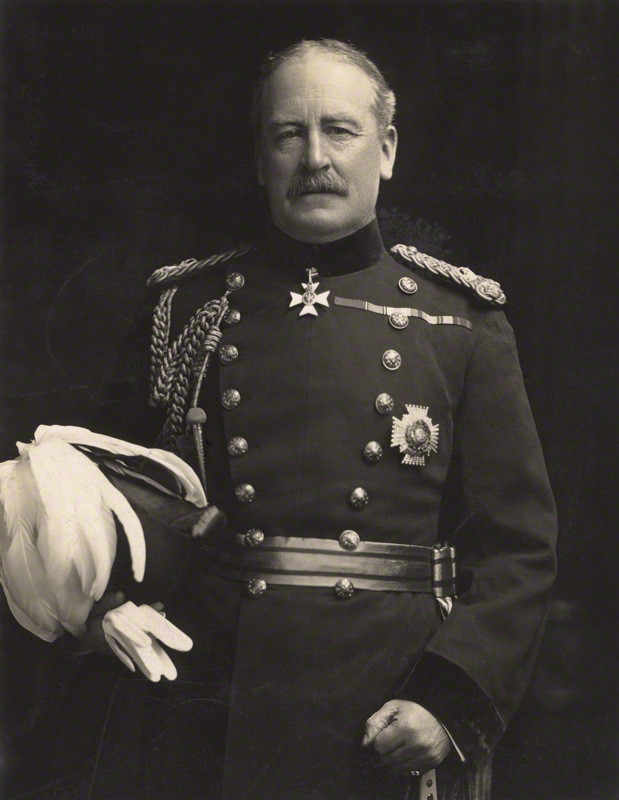
Herbert Miles

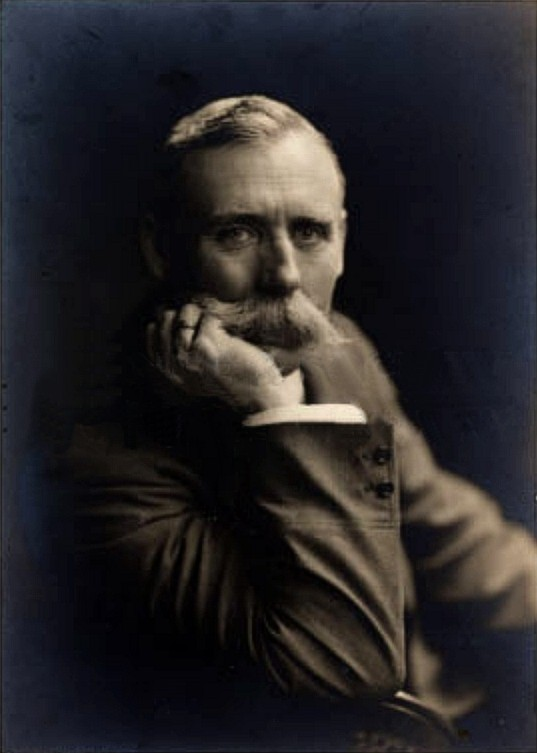
James Booker Blakemore Wellington

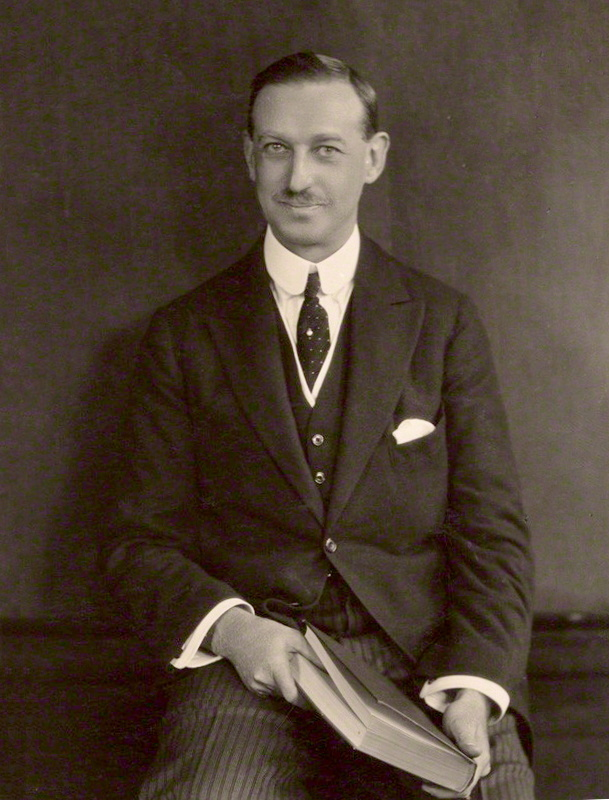
James Stanhope, 7th Earl Stanhope

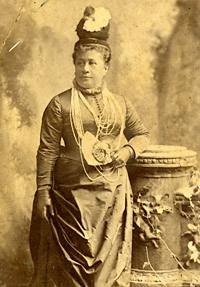
Queen Kapiolani

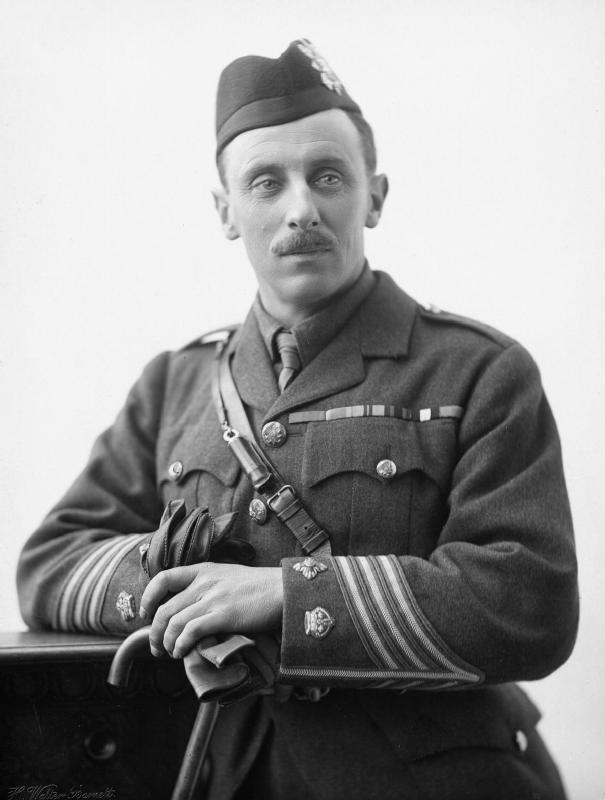
Lewis Pugh Evans

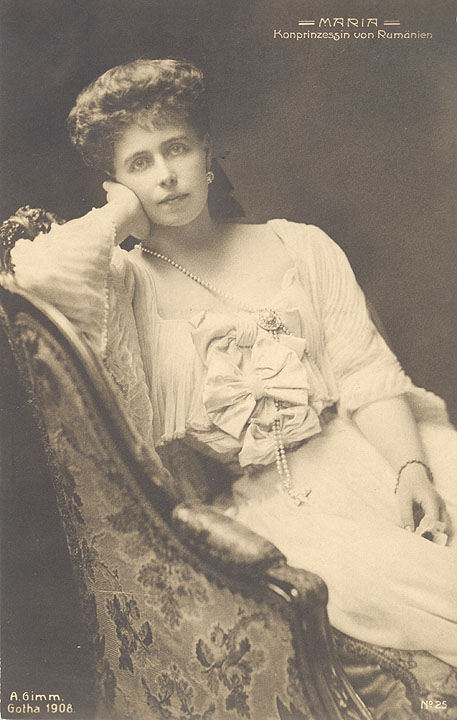
Marie of Romania

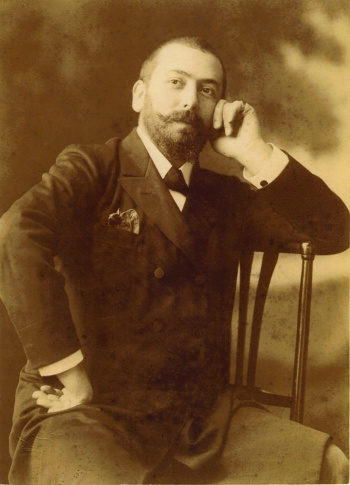
Marius Sestier

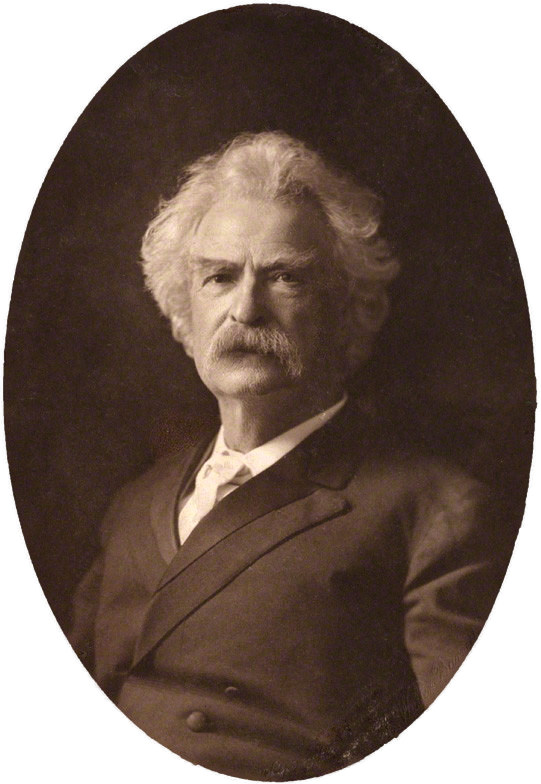
Mark Twain

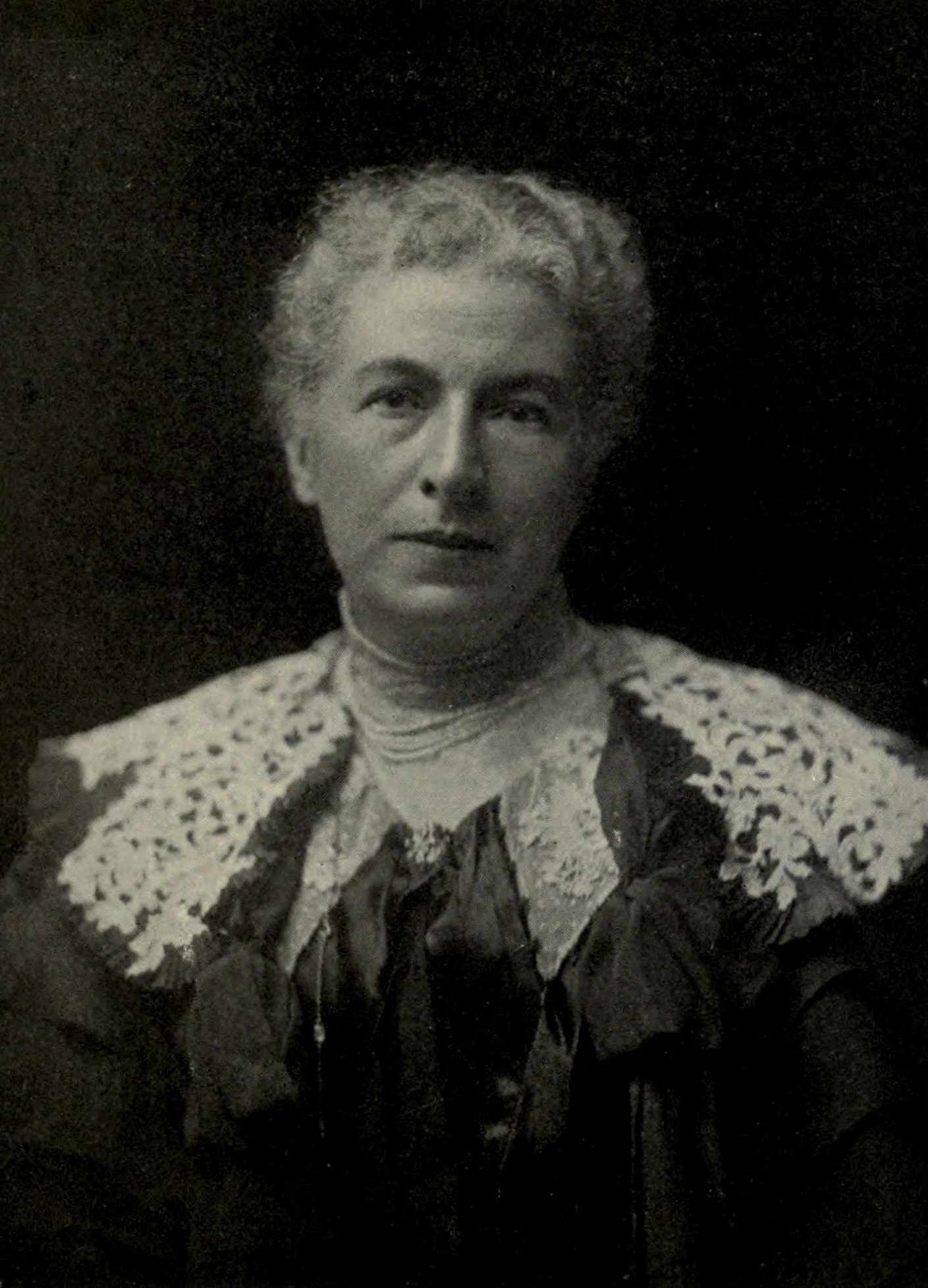
Mary Augusta Ward

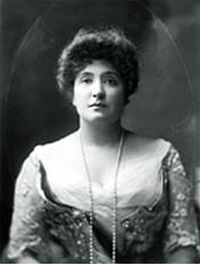
Nellie Melba

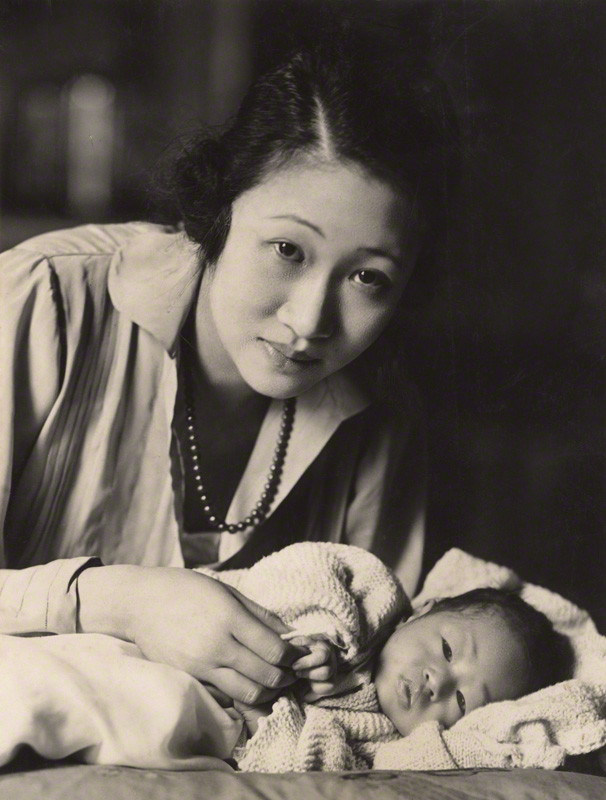
Oei Hui-lan, Madame Wellington Koo

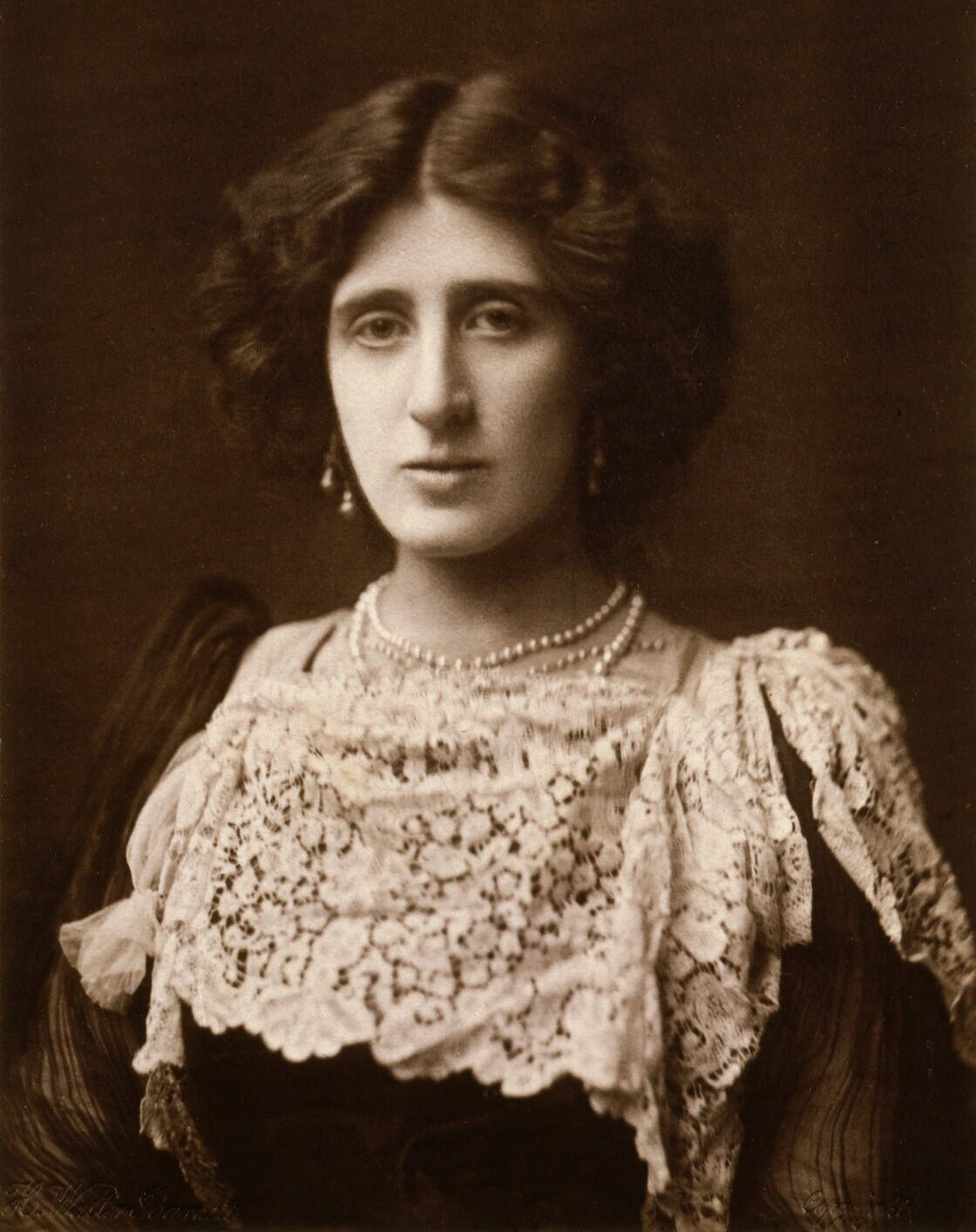
Lady Ottoline Morrell

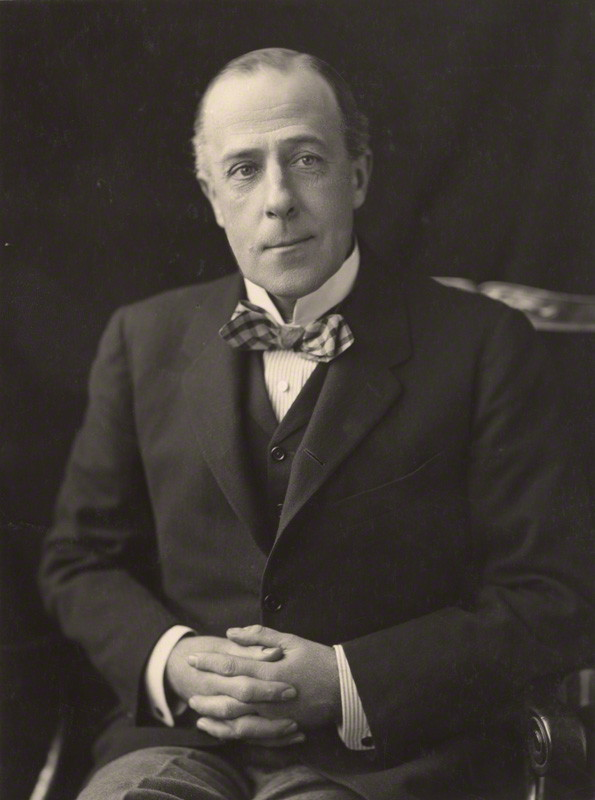
Richard Verney, 19th Baron Willoughby de Broke

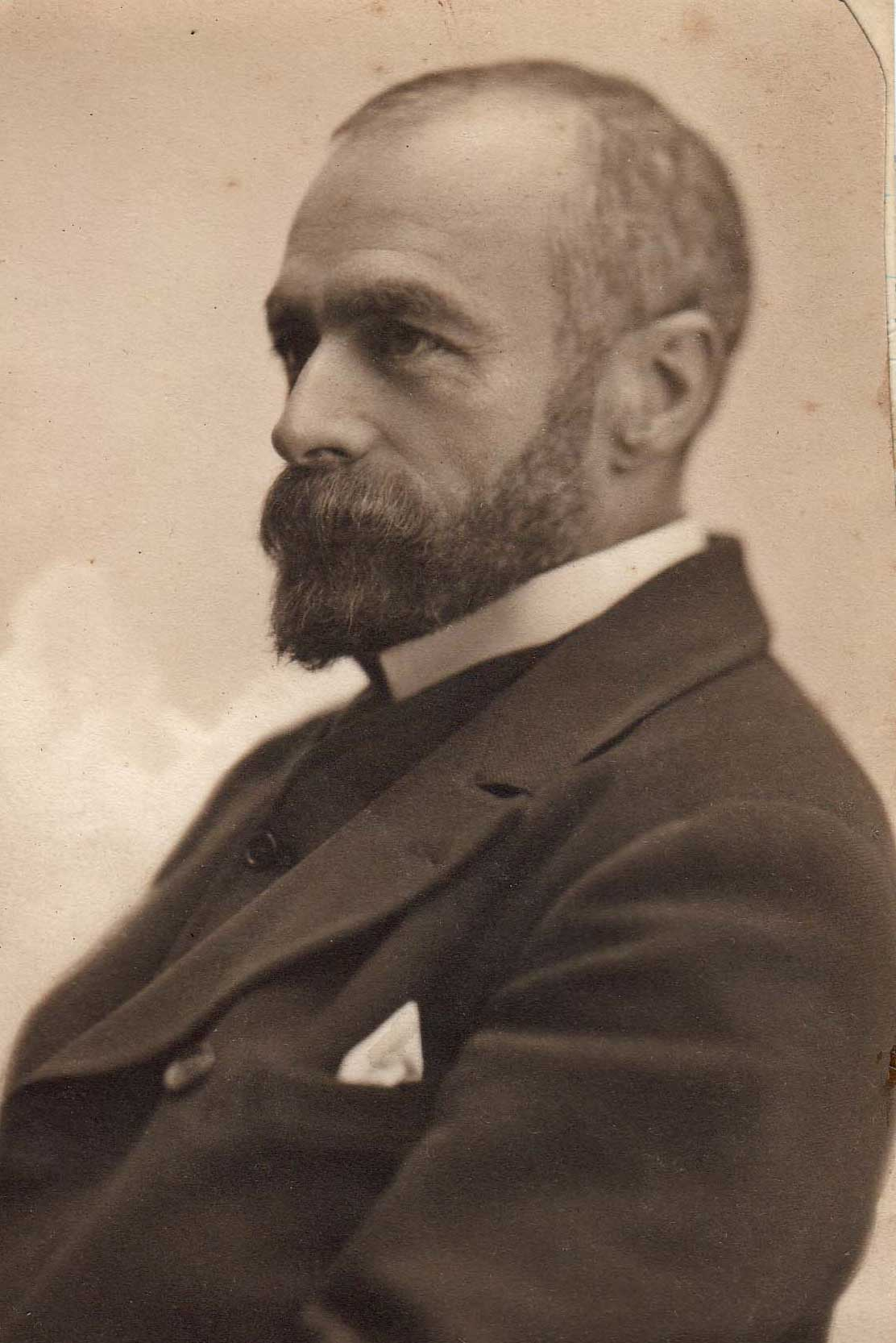
Victor Branford

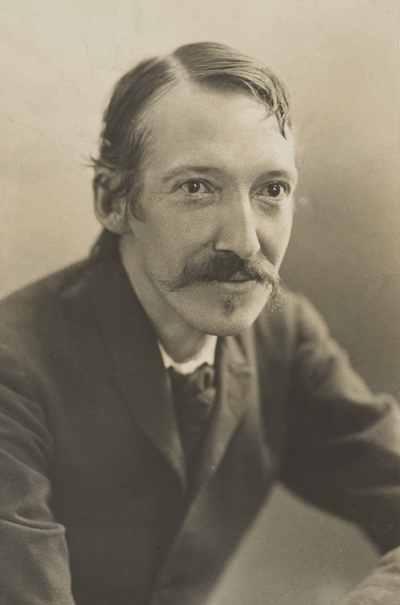
Robert Louis Stevenson

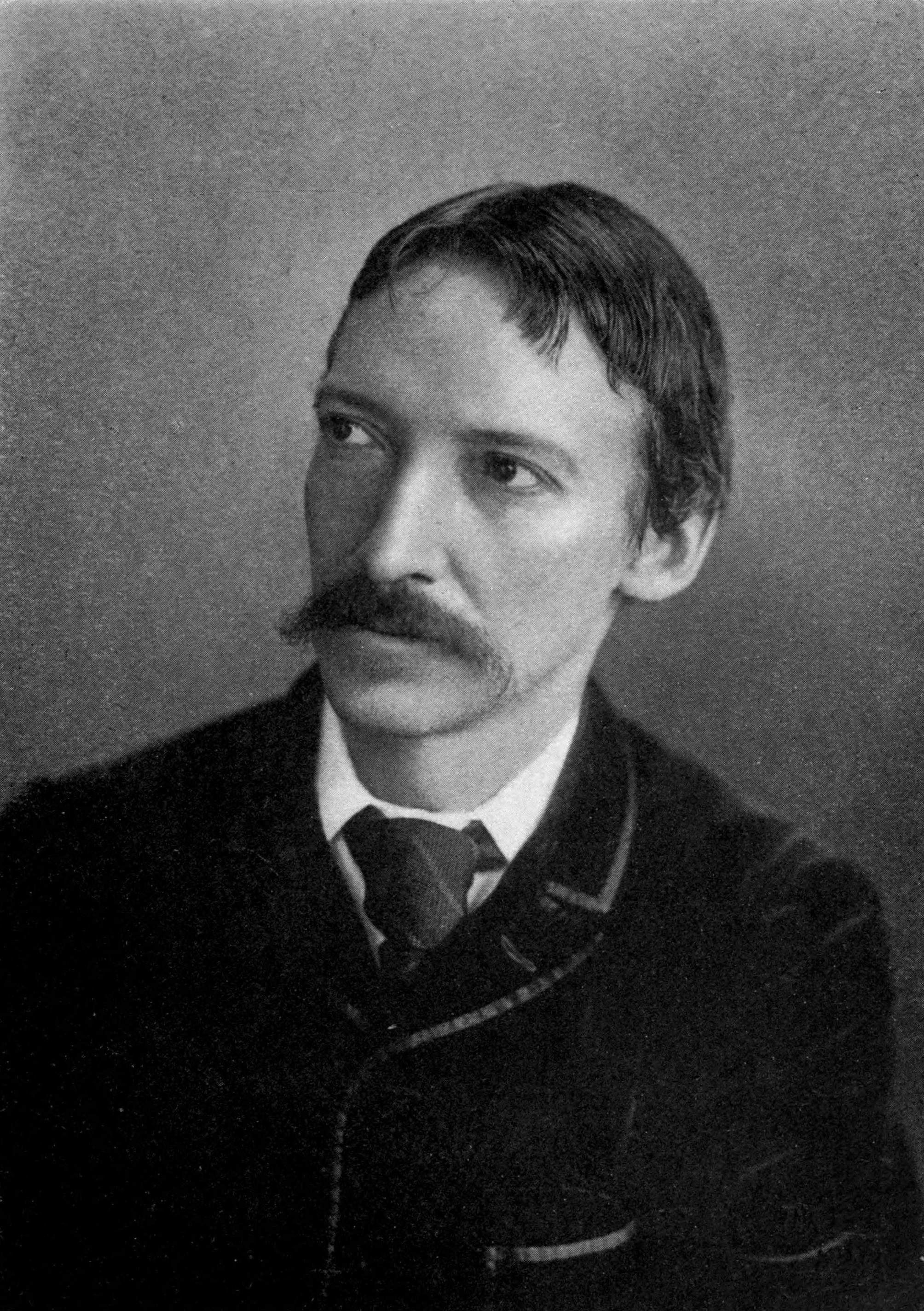
Robert Louis Stevenson

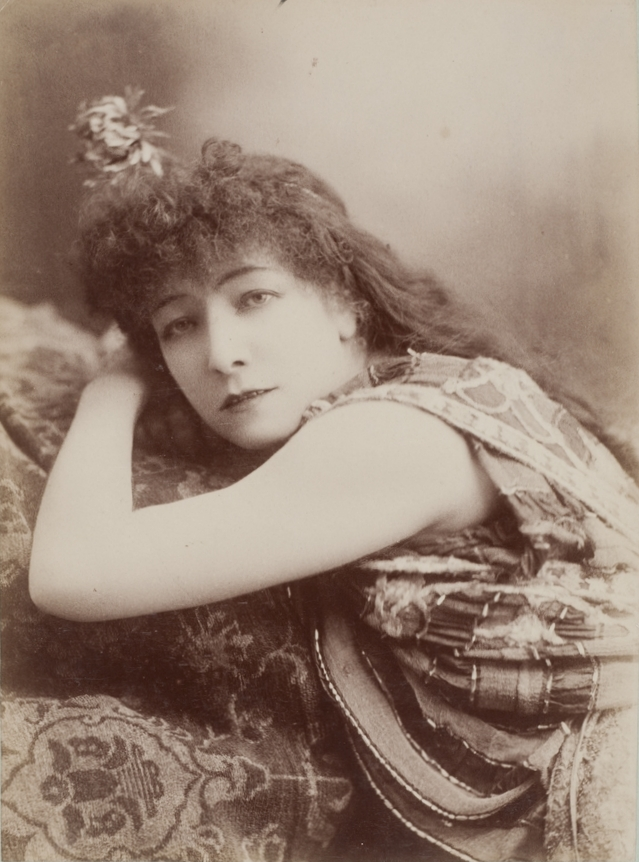
Sarah Bernhardt

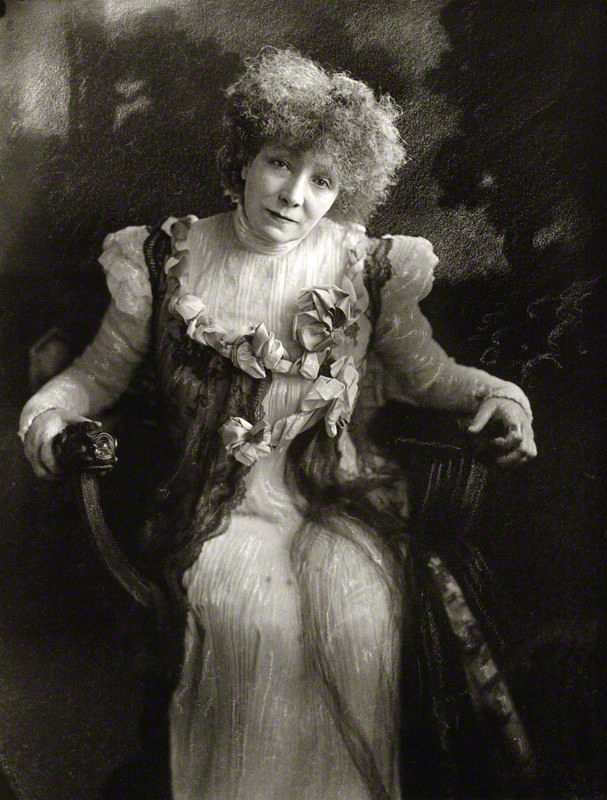
Sarah Bernhardt

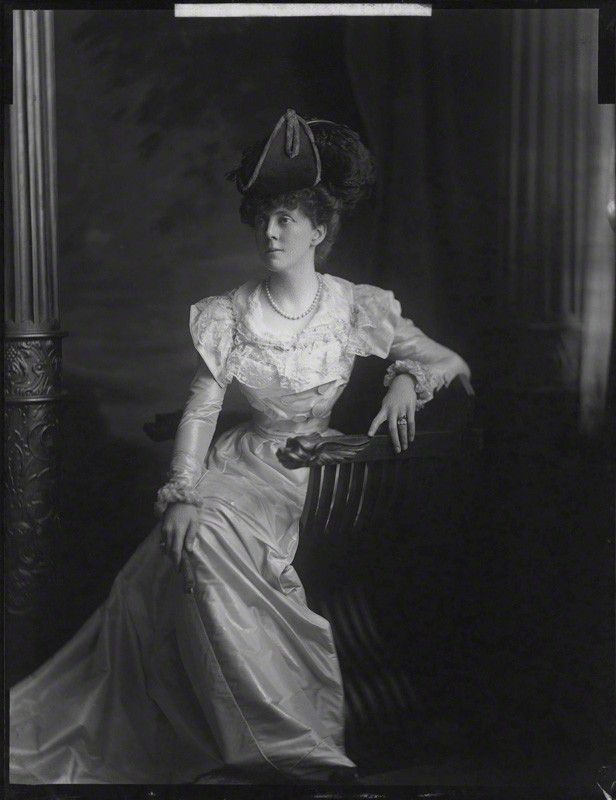
Sarah Wilson (war correspondent)

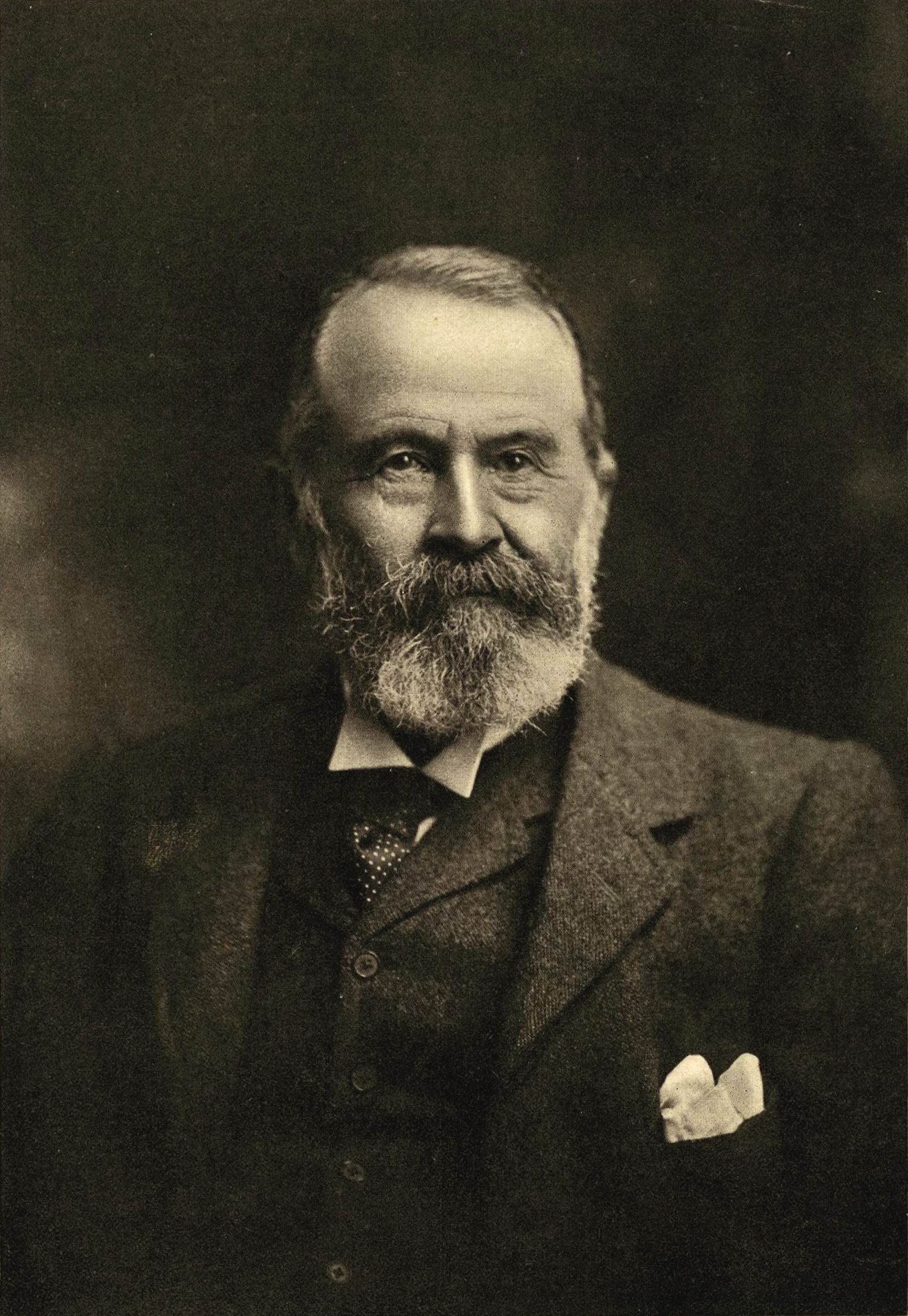
Thomas Alexander Browne

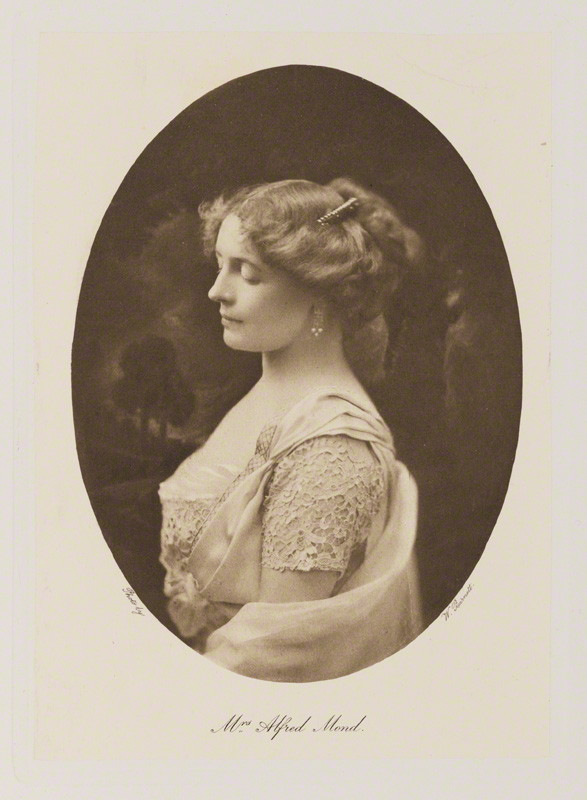
Violet Mond, Baroness Melchett

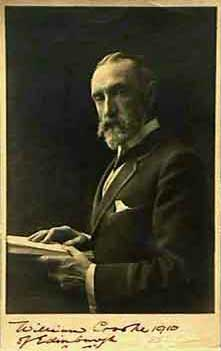
William Crooke (photographer)
