= Prince Ranjitsinhji Practising Batting in the Nets =

1897 cricket film of Ranjitsinhji

- Produced by: Henry Walter Barnett
- Production company: Falk Studios Melbourne
- Release date: 1897 (Australia)
- Running time: 2 min 20 sec
- Country: Australia
- Language: Silent

External videos
- Prince Ranjitsinhji Practising Batting in the Nets BFI

Prince Ranjitsinhji Practising Batting in the Nets was a 1897 film of the cricketer Ranjitsinhji.

This film attributed to Henry Walter Barnett, is one of the earliest surviving about cricket.
