= Marius Sestier =

French cinematographer

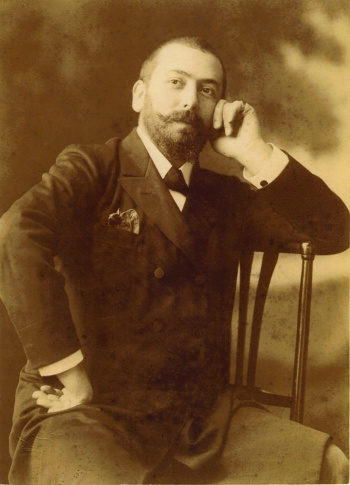
- Sestier in 1896, photographed by Henry Walter Barnett
- Born: Marius Ely Joseph Sestier; 8 August 1861; Sauzet, Drôme, France
- Died: 8 November 1928 (aged 67); Sauzet, Drôme, France
- Occupations: Cinematographer, pharmacist

Marius Ely Joseph Sestier (8 September 1861 – 8 November 1928) was a French cinematographer. Sestier was best known for his work in Australia, where he shot some of the country's first films.

Born in Sauzet, Drôme, Sestier was a pharmacist by profession. He was employed by early filmmakers the Lumière brothers (Auguste and Louis Lumière) to demonstrate their cinématographe abroad. In this capacity he travelled to India in June 1896, where he held a showcase of six short films made by the Lumière brothers at Watson's Hotel, Bombay on 7 July 1896; this was the first time moving pictures had been shown in India. Sestier also shot his own films while in Bombay, but the Lumière brothers rejected these for their catalogue as they were not satisfied with the quality as French customs had opened the package of undeveloped film.

After Sestier completed his work in India he travelled to Sydney where he met with Australian photographer Henry Walter Barnett, who had darkroom facilities to develop films locally.

In September 1896 Sestier, Barnett and Charles Westmacott opened Australia's first cinema, the Salon Lumière in Pitt Street, Sydney. Sestier and Barnett began making their own films, starting with a short film of passengers disembarking from the ship PS Brighton in Manly, which was the first film shot and screened in Australia. Sestier and Barnett made approximately 19 films together in Sydney and Melbourne, most notably a film of the 1896 Melbourne Cup horse race. The feature, which consisted of 10 one-minute films shown in chronological order (separate films were required due to limitations of cameras of the time), was premiered at the Princess Theatre, Melbourne on 19 November 1896, with Sestier giving an accompanying lecture. It was covered in the Australian press, including The Age and The Bulletin, and has been cited as Australia's first film production.

After his business partnership with Barnett ended Sestier continued to tour Australia, demonstrating the cinématographe and showcasing films until May 1897. After returning to France he went on to become director of the Lumière Patents Company.

== Filmography ==
=== Australia ===
| Title | Cast | Genre | Notes |
|---|---|---|---|
1896 Sydney
| Passengers Alighting from Ferry Brighton at Manly | | Short documentary | 24 November IMDb |
| New South Wales Horse Artillery in Action | | Short documentary | 24 November IMDb |
| Patineur Grotesque | | Short comedy | IMDb |
1896 Melbourne
| Victoria Derby | Lady Brassey | Sport documentary | filmed on 31 October |
| The Melbourne Cup | Henry Walter Barnett, Lord Brassey | Sport documentary | 24 November IMDb |
