= Chapel of the Sacred Heart (Dingle) =

Chapel in Dingle, County Kerry, Ireland

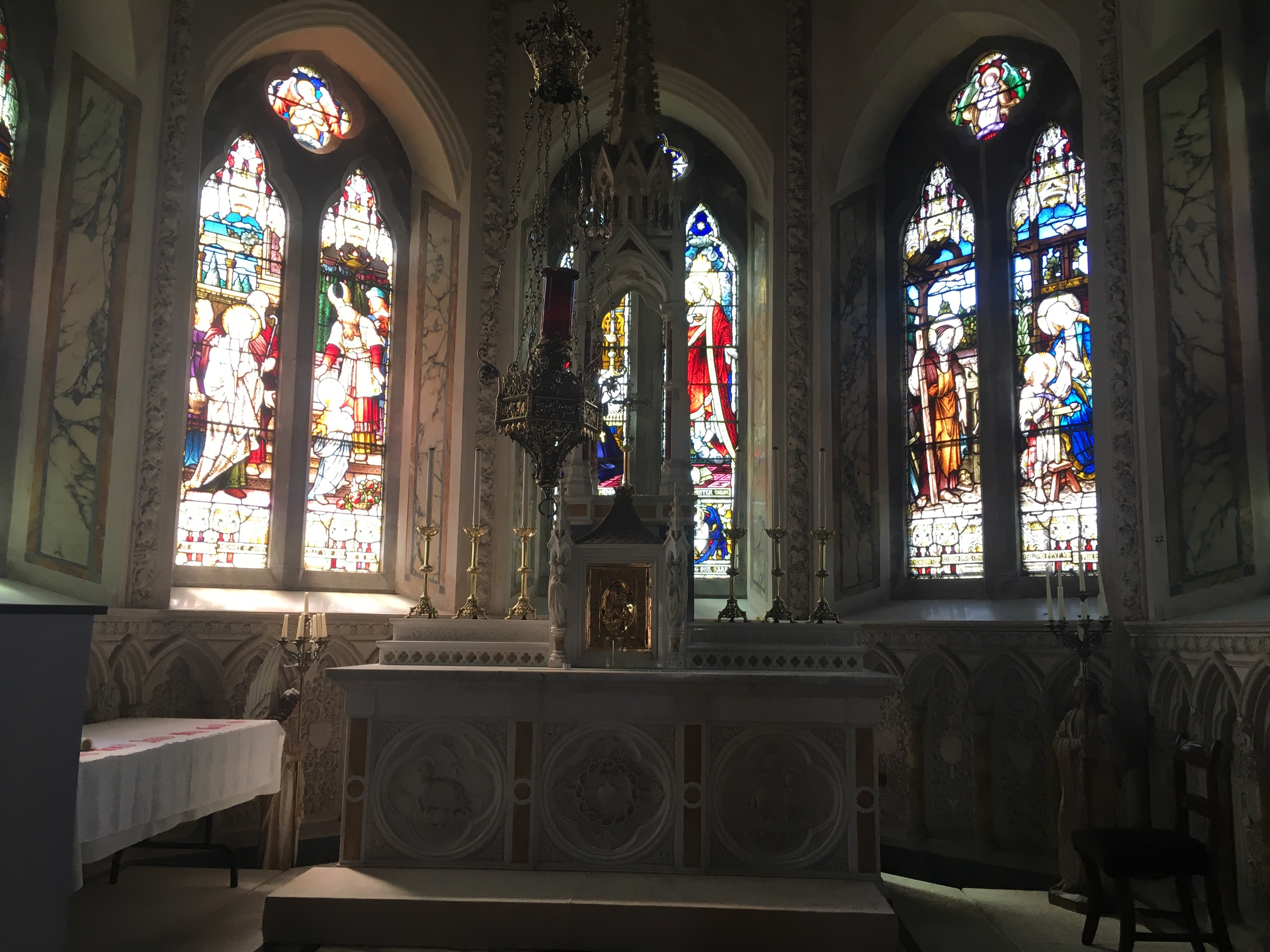
Altar, reredos and original, c. 1886, windows. Chapel of the Sacred Heart, Dingle

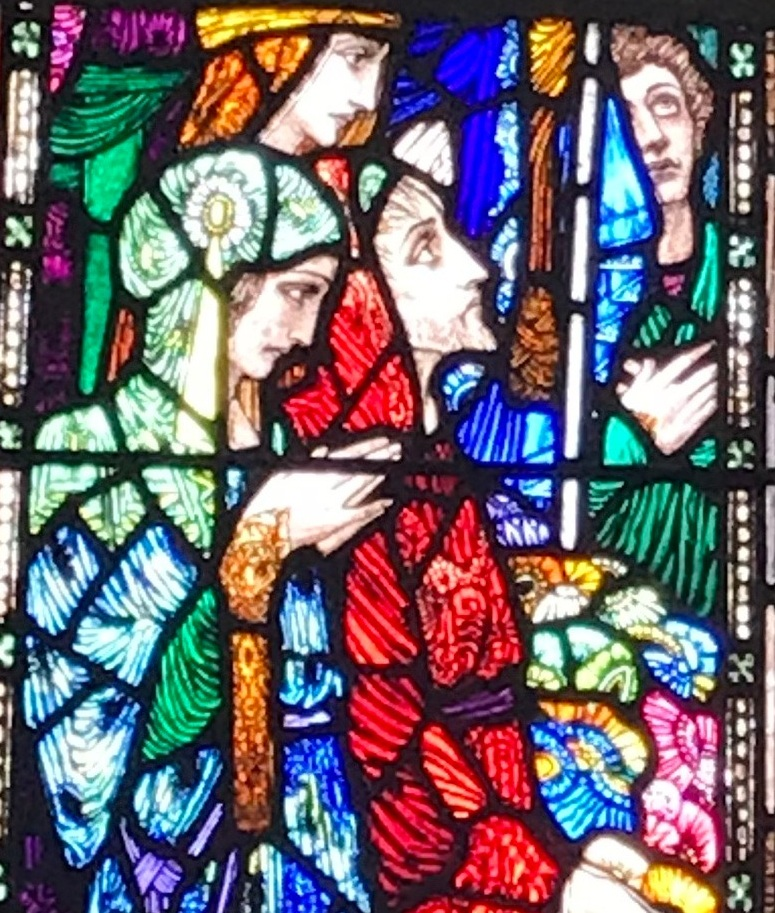
Detail of The Sermon on the Mount, 1924

The Chapel of the Sacred Heart is a neo-gothic chapel in Dingle, County Kerry, Ireland. Attached to Saint Mary's Catholic Church, on Green Street in the centre of the town, it was built for a local enclosed order of Presentation Sisters, by the architect C. J. McCarthy in 1886. The original building consisted of a short and narrow nave, flanked by choir stalls, leading to an altar and three stained glass bay windows.

The chapel underwent major refurbishment in the early 1920s, during the tenure of the order's Mother Superior Ita Macken. Under guidance from the Irish architect and architectural historian Rudolf M. Butler, Macken commissioned the Irish artist Harry Clarke to produce six double lancet stained glass windows for the chapel. They were completed and installed in 1924, with three of the colourful and highly detailed windows situated on either side of the nave. The lancets depict scenes from the life of Christ. Clarke was at the time a leading figure in the Arts and Crafts movement and was paid a fee of £1,000 for the works.

Today it is under the ownership of Díseart Centre of Irish Spirituality and Culture (Irish: Ionad Spioradáltachta agus Cultúir Ghaelaigh). As Clarke later became an internationally renowned artist, the chapel is a significant local tourist attraction.

== Description ==
Mother Ita Macken, photographed with Father Ignatius CP. Date unknown

The altar and reredos of the chapel are dedicated to the Sacred Heart, and were designed by the architect Rudolf M. Butler, and sculpted by George Smith. Butler also designed the sanctuary, which is lined with Italian marble tiles, and contains twenty-four panels decorated with the Presentation Order symbol of an oak tree, as well as representations of a Celtic cross, and symbols of Jesus' crucifixion, including a crown of thorns, sponge, and nails.

Choir stalls and Stations of the Cross line each side of the short and narrow nave. The choir arches are made from Spanish oak. In the 19th century, the nuns would each have had a set place in the chapel, with, according to Díseart, the "novices [sitting on hinged seats] closest to the altar, while the Mother Superior and the Mistress of Novices were seated on either side of the entrance".

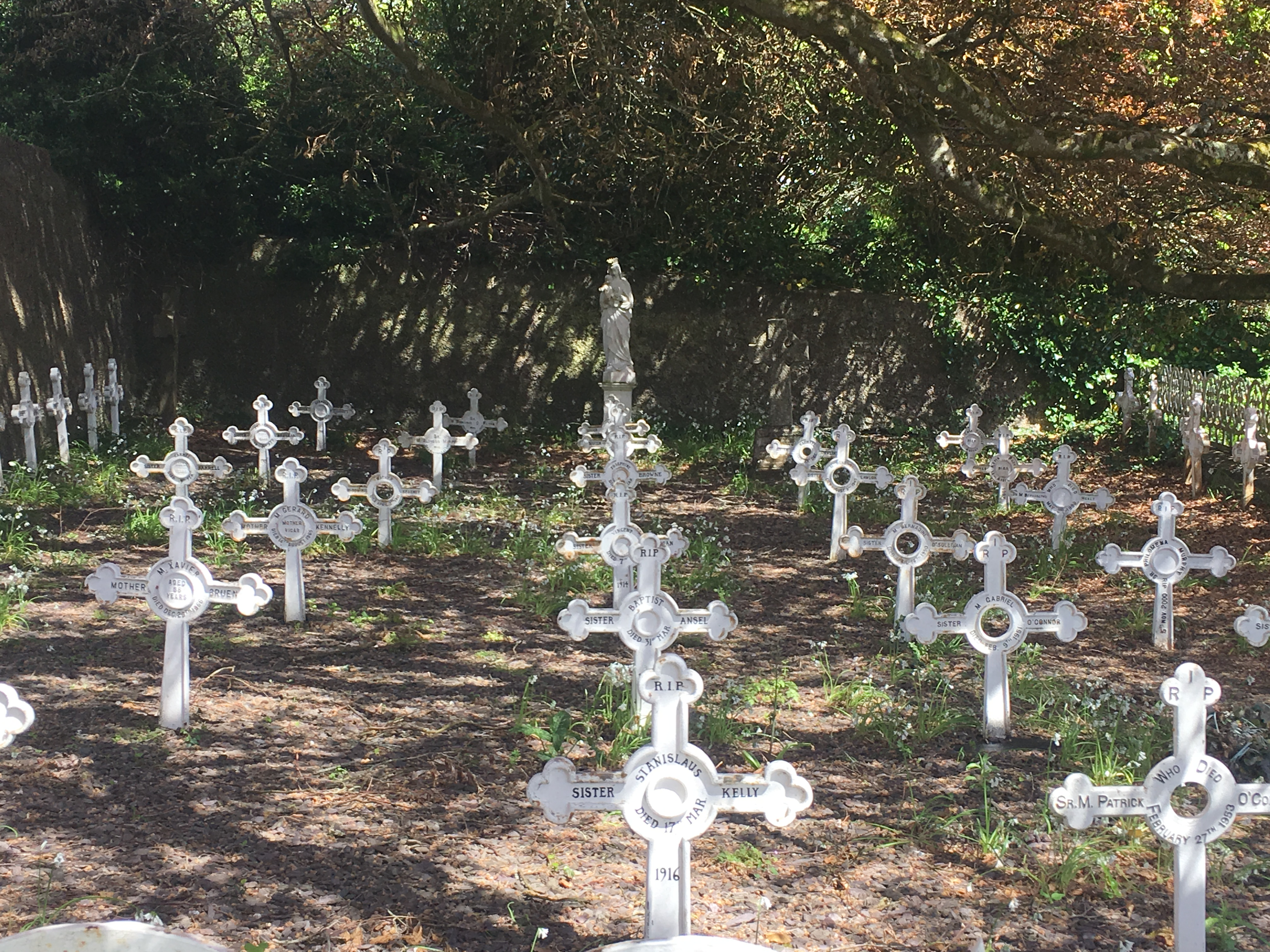
Presentation nun's graveyard, located alongside the chapel

The seats are hinged as the nuns would have alternately sat or stood during call and response chants. Díseart explains how "the...seats lifted up as the nuns rose for those parts of the Liturgy where they were required to stand; underneath each seat is a protruding ledge, specifically for the elderly Sisters to rest on while still appearing to stand".

The chapel is located on the third floor of the convent building on the grounds of Saint Mary's Catholic Church. The building also contains a buon fresco of the Last Supper, designed by Ella Yates, in the refectory (dining room), a series of icons of Irish saints, and a room of murals commemorating the life of Nano Nagle, the Cork nun who founded the Presentation Order in 1775.

Generations of Saint Mary's Presentation nuns are buried in a small, compact and linearly arranged graveyard outside the chapel.

== Harry Clarke windows ==
In June 1922, Sister Ita Macken, in consultation with Butler, commissioned the then up-and-coming Harry Clarke to design and install six double-lancet or "light", stained glass windows, at an agreed fee of £1,000. Clarke completed the cartoons in February 1924, and was closely involved in the window's production, overseeing members of his studio (employee's of Harry's father, Joshua's studio "J. Clarke & Sons", which from 1930 became "Harry Clarke Stained Glass Ltd"). The artist Philip Deegan was particularly involved in their execution.

The windows were completed and installed in the chapel in March 1924. Shortly after, Clarke wrote to Macken, recounting "the pleasure of hearing from Mr Butler to the effect that he has visited Dingle, and that the windows are in every effect satisfactory."

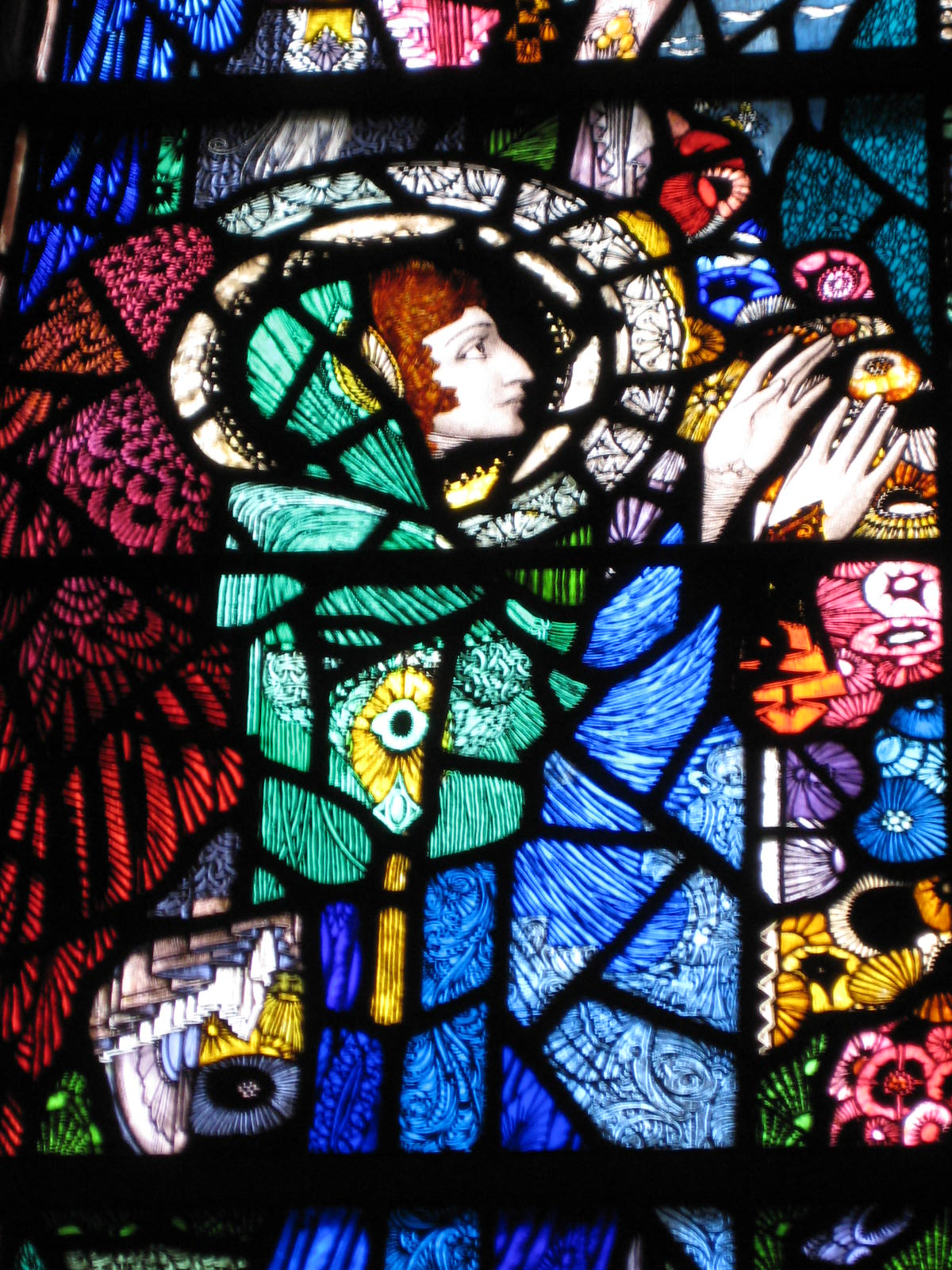
The Baptism of Jesus (detail)

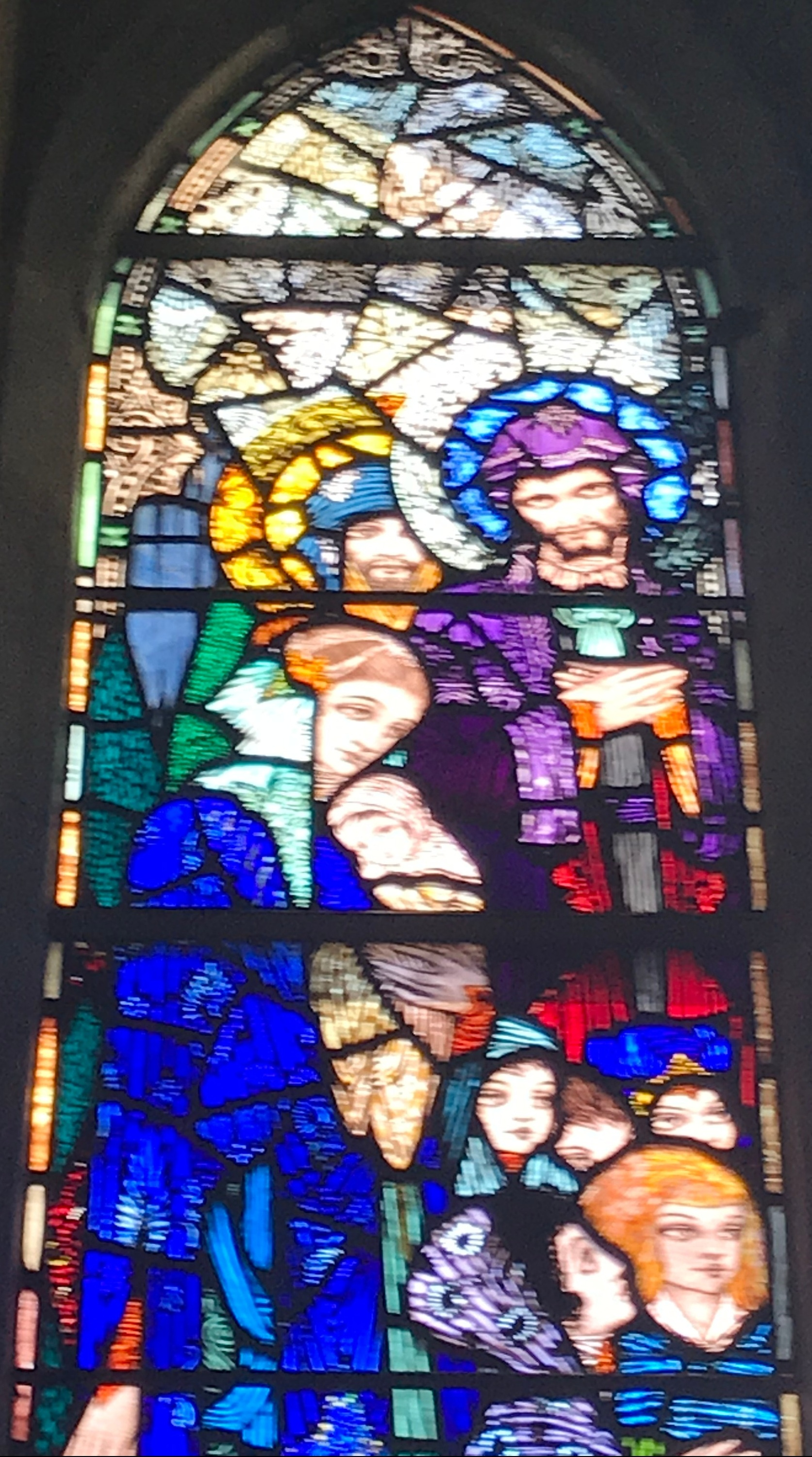
Let the little children come to Me (detail)

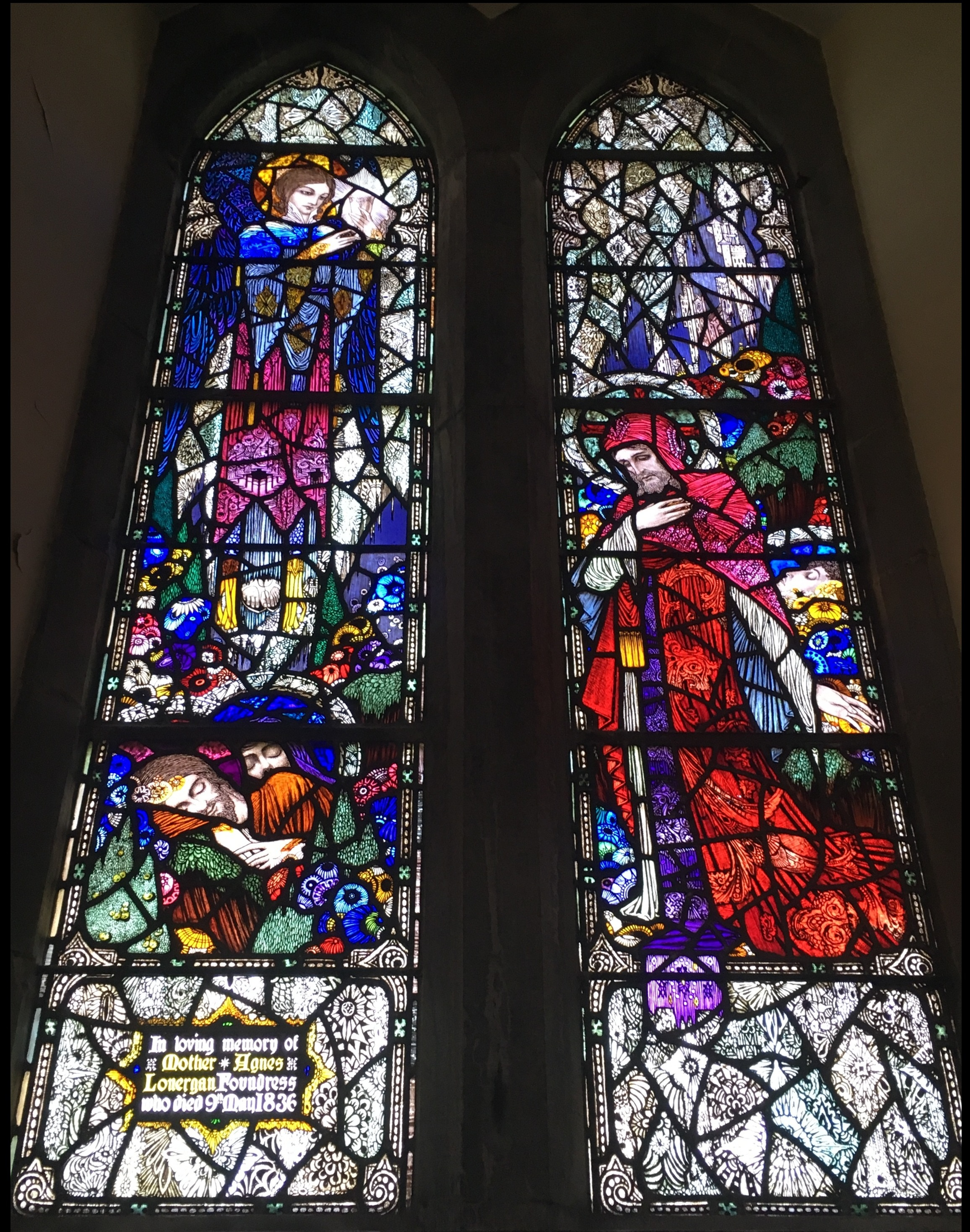
The Agony in the Garden

The six double lancet windows each show a scene from the life of Christ.

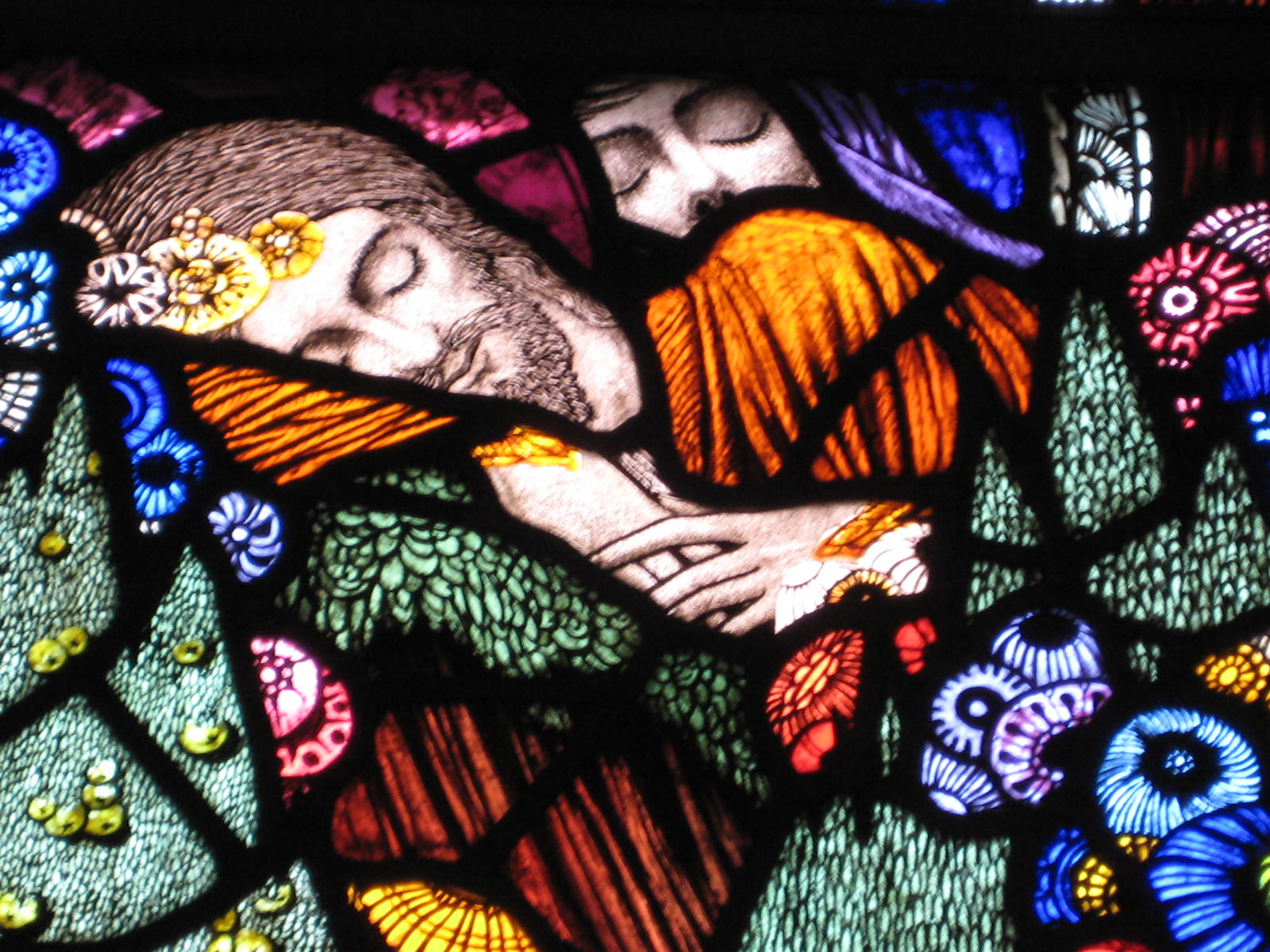
Harry Clarke, The Agony in the Garden (detail)

1. The Visit of the Magi - This diptych begins with an angel positioned over Jesus. The second lancet, or light, shows Mary wearing a blue cloak, with Christ Child straggling her lap.
2. The Baptism of Jesus - His baptism at the river Jordan was witnessed three angels.
3. Let the little children come to me - Mary holds an infant in long swaddling clothes in the first lancet, as two disciples stand behind her. In the second, Jesus sits among a group of children.
4. The Sermon on the Mount - The upper glass panels of the first lancet show six disciples attending Jesus' most celebrated teachings as recounted in the Gospel of Matthew. In the second, Jesus speaks to a crowd from an elevated mound, where he is attended by two disciples.
5. The Agony in the Garden - The first light shows an angel watching over Jesus. The second shows Jesus' anguish on the Mount of Olives on the night before his crucifixion. A disciple sleeps on a bed of flowers beside him.
6. Jesus Appears to Mary Magdalene - The cliffs above Mary Magdalene contain a town and a detailed view of women in silver and gold cloaks walking across cobblestones.
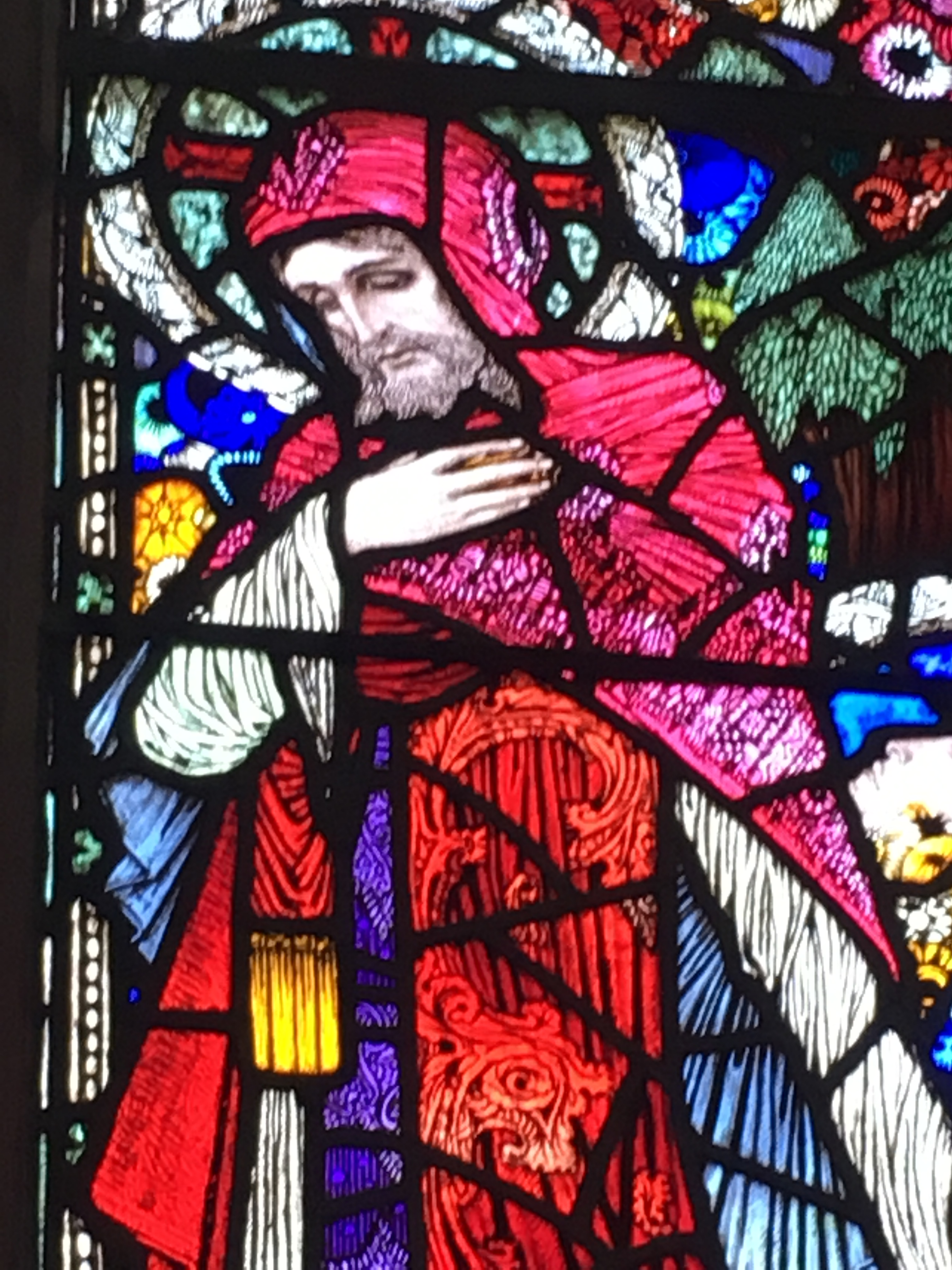
The Agony in the Garden (detail)

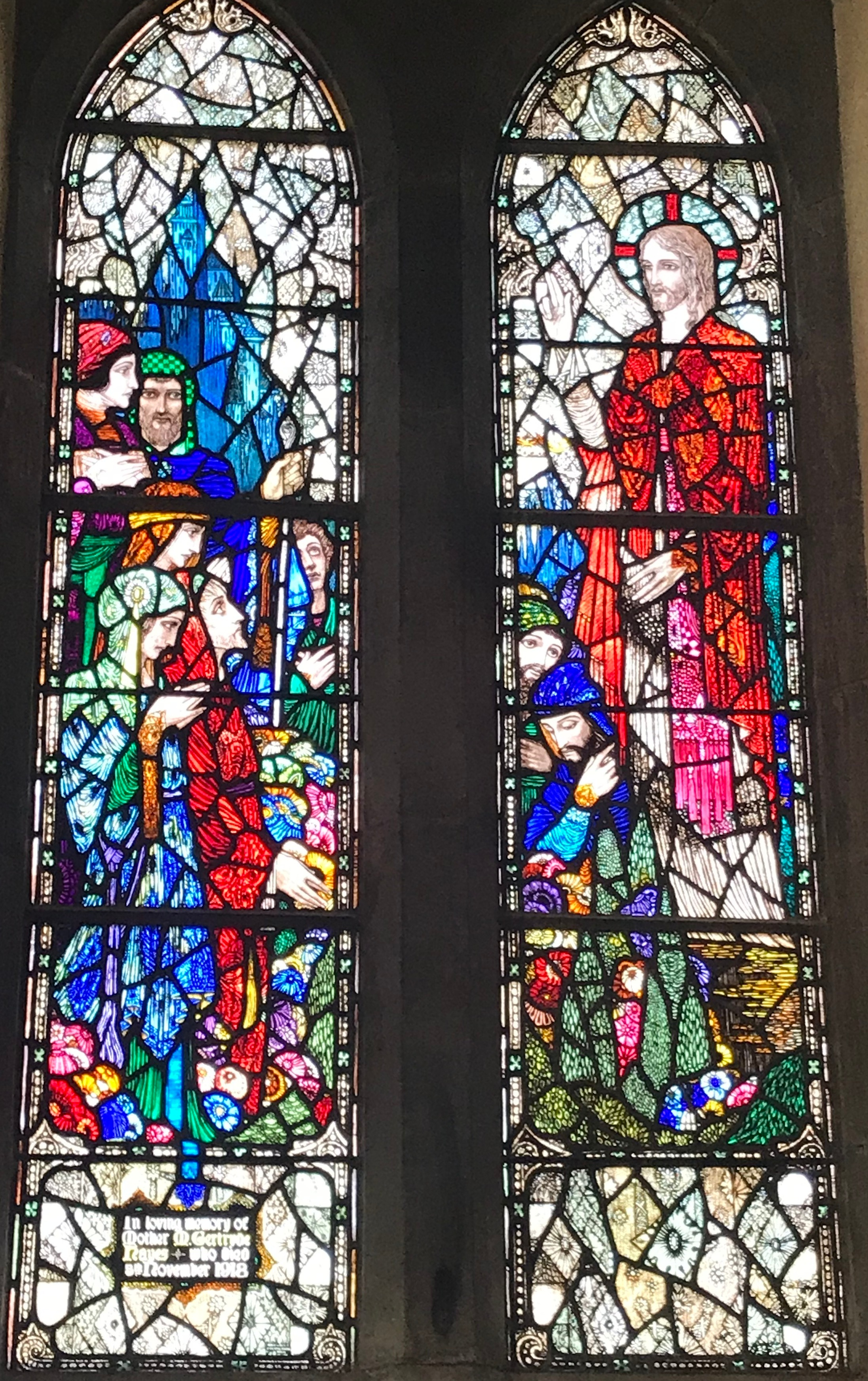
The Sermon on the Mount

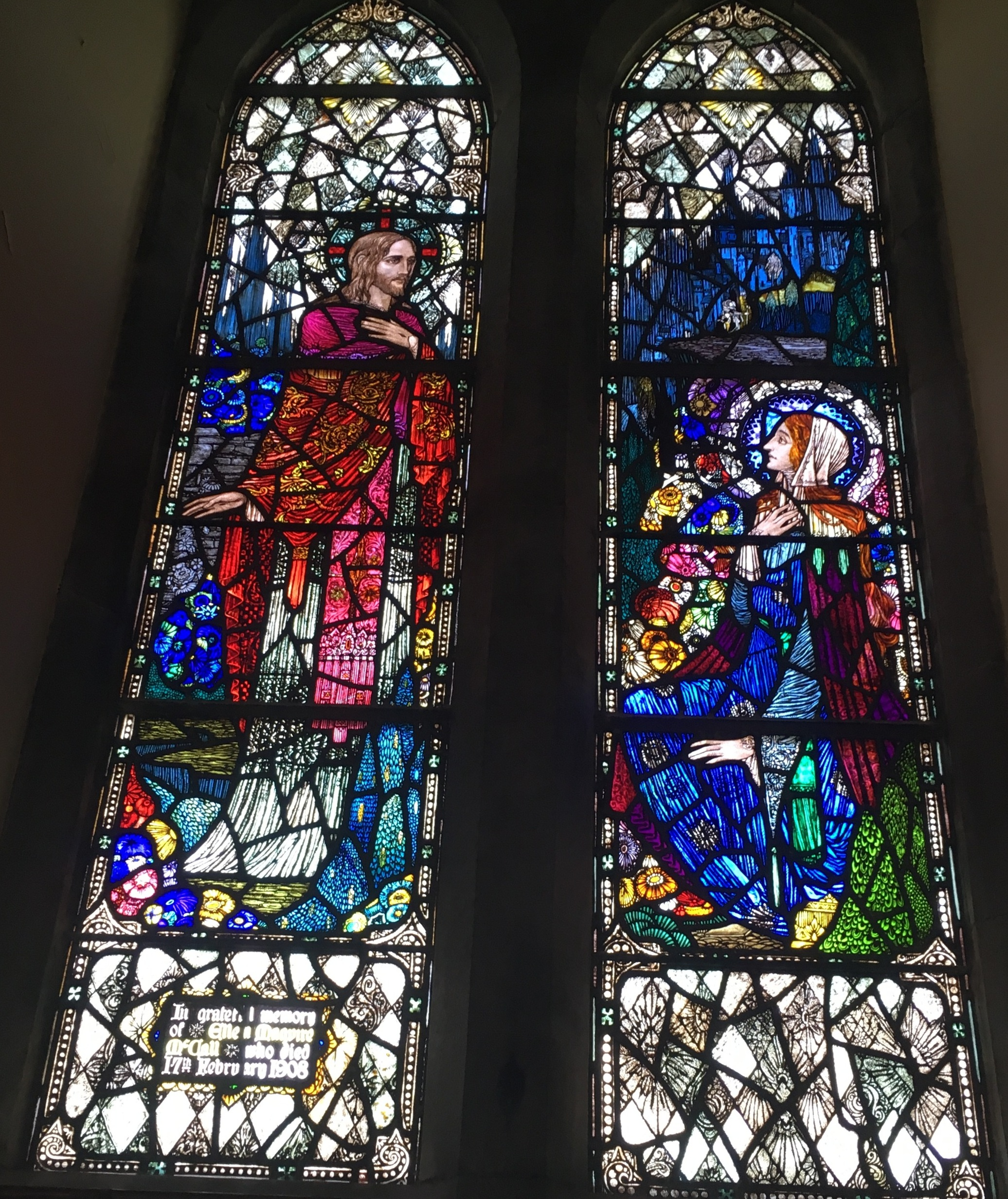
Jesus Appears to Mary Magdalene
