= Queenie Scott-Hopper =

English children's author

Mabel Olive Scott-Hopper
- Born: 1881; Gateshead, England
- Died: 6 February 1924 (aged 42–43); Whitley Bay, England
- Occupation: writer
- Writing career
- Pen name: Queenie Scott-Hopper
- Genre: children's literature

Queenie Scott-Hopper was the pen name of Mabel Olive Scott-Hopper (1881 – 6 February 1924), an English author of children’s stories, poetry, and devotional literature.

== Biography ==
Mabel Olive Scott-Hopper was one of four children born to solicitor Robert Scott-Hopper and Sarah Anne Hopper (née Orwin). Scott-Hopper was born in Gateshead, then part of County Durham, England, and later moved with her parents to Whitley Bay, Northumberland. A biographical note from the anthology Pearls of Poesy (1911) attests that "the whole of her education was the work of her mother, who is her constant companion and abiding inspiration."

Literary historian Jane Platt theorizes that the family struggled financially due to bankruptcy filings by Robert Scott-Hopper in 1889 and 1905. Her younger brother, father, and mother died within years of each other, and eventually Scott-Hopper took her own life by slitting her throat on 6 February 1924. An inquest revealed that she "had been depressed since her mother's death" and suffered from insomnia as well as an inability to think of new stories. Newspapers reported that she visited a bank the morning of her death, which Platt sees as a significant reflection of her mental state.

== Career ==
Scott-Hopper’s prolific output for the twenty year period that she was active as a writer included children’s novels and short stories, occasional poems, essays, and devotional literature. Platt suggests that she was determined to succeed financially, which “encouraged her to write for any and every outlet which would accept her work.” She cites Scott-Hopper’s address book as an indicator of her anxiety over remuneration for her work, as she recorded terms of payment for various publications next to the names of publishers, most offering one guinea per 1,000 words.

Scott-Hopper’s earliest literary efforts were occasional poems commemorating notable national events. Her subjects were varied, ranging from the efforts to rescue miners in the Sacristan Pit, County Durham, on 16 November 1903 to honoring Belgian soldiers and refugees during the First World War. An example of her work is the encomium “A Blind Child’s Holiday” (1914), inspired by a story about the blind teacher G. I. Walker and his pupils at the Sunderland Council Blind School. At the Hull Conference of the Museums Association in July 1913, John Alfred Charlton Deas, curator at Sunderland Museum, read her poem to the delegates as part of his plea to enhance museum design to facilitate access and enjoyment for blind visitors. Similar secular poems of praise were dedicated to Princess Marie-José of Belgium and Charles Dickens.

Many of her occasional poems were patriotic, such as “Ode on Empire Day” (1907), “Who Crowns the King?” (1911), and “It’s a Death of Glory” (1915). Platt links further contributions to religious publications such as Dawn of Day (1911-1921), Home Words (1914-1919), The Sign (1915), Banner of Faith (1916), and Ecclesia (1918).

Her first published book of poetry was Pull the Bobbin! A Garland of Child Verse (1919) which collected nineteen poems into an edition illustrated by Winifred M. Ackroyd. Other poetry included devotional verse, including collections titled In the King’s Service (1921), the Children’s Book of Common Prayer (1921), and Songs of Faith and Fellowship (1924). Her poems were published regularly in The Treasury, An Illustrated Magazine between 1907 and 1911.

Scott-Hopper’s first book-length prose publications were issued in 1905 as part of W. T. Stead’s Books for the Bairns series. The first, In the Christmas Firelight (1905), a selection of five holiday stories, initiated the form of romantic Christmas tale that would become her stock-in-trade. The Story of Hiawatha, Re-Told in Prose (1905) was based on the poem by Henry Wadsworth Longfellow. Later book-length fiction featured children overcoming adversity, including Rock Bottom (1920), Angel Unawares (1921), and Nick (1924). Platt believes Rock Bottom to be semi-autobiographical, citing the plot in which a girl “copes with an unsatisfactory father’s financial disasters by using her writing talent, first by penning verse for her local newspaper, then by approaching established publishers.”

Christmas editions of newspapers annually featured her seasonal stories for children and from 1905 until her death she regularly produced short stories with holiday themes, such as “A Bunch of Mistletoe” (1908), “How Nell and Bell Met Santa Claus” (1912), and “Jack Frost and Santa Claus” (1918). Although her short stories were published throughout England, she was particularly favored by the northern press. By 1907 she was a regular contributor of short stories to the Newcastle Weekly Chronicle. In 1920 the Sunday Sun (Newcastle) ran her weekly illustrated series titled “Fairy Tale Country: And What We Did There.”

== Reception ==
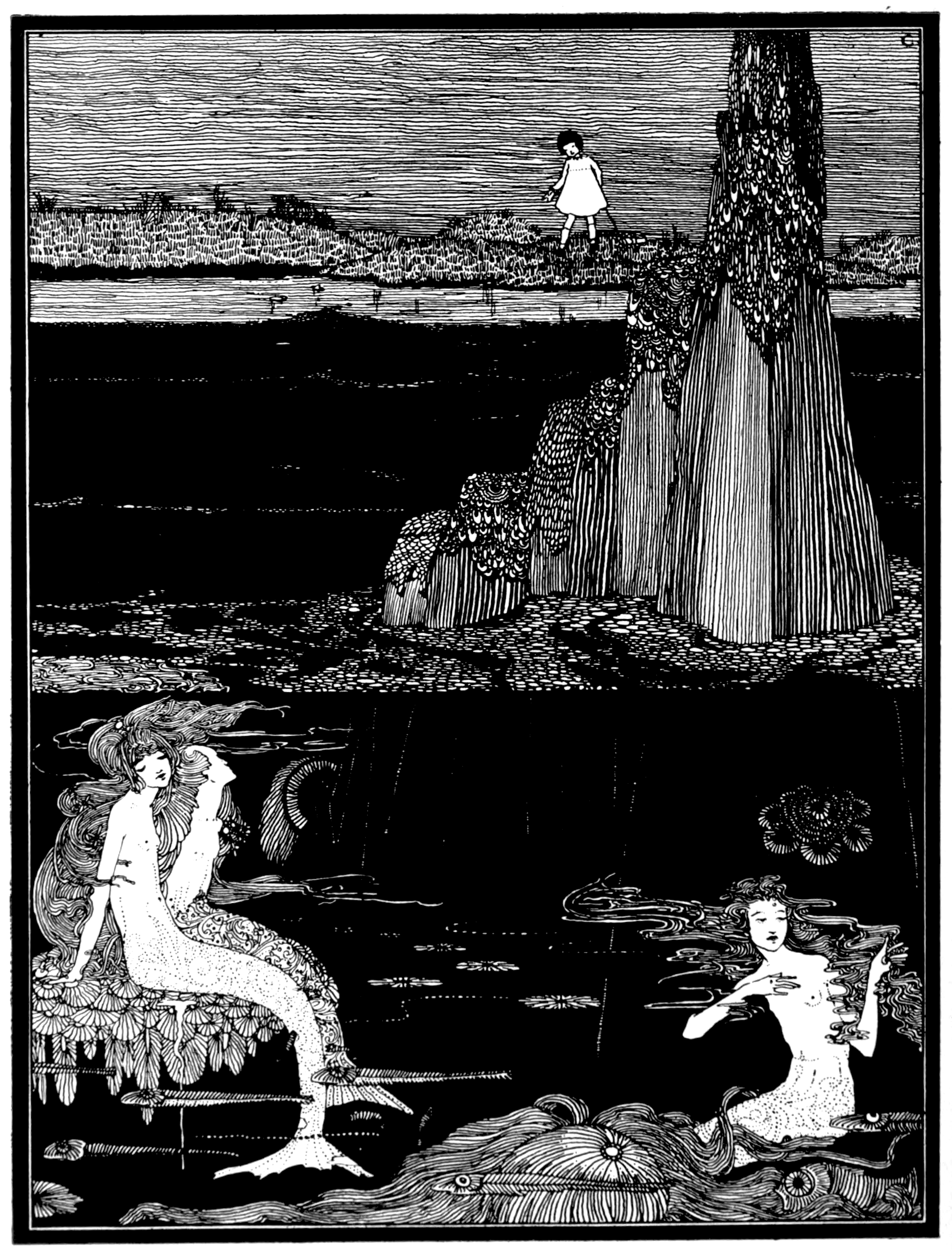
"Very Nearly." Illustration by Harry Clarke for The Year's at the Spring: An Anthology of Recent Poetry. Ed. Lettice D'Oyly Walters (London: George G. Harrap, 1920).

Reception of Scott-Hopper’s work during her lifetime generally took the form of advertising copy that praised her popularity rather than full and independent reviews. For example, an announcement for Pull the Bobbin! placed in The Monthly Chapbook of 1919 suggested to readers that the “charming collection will be welcomed by the nursery, and by the grown ups who are interested in child psychology. Miss Scott-Hopper knows how to capture the child-spirit and the children revealed by her poems go to one’s heart.”

By 1920, her books warranted brief lines of praise in northern newspapers. A short review of Rock Bottom in 1920 cited characters who “are delightfully portrayed,” and noted that “the author's sense of humor is evident all through the book, while the touches of pathos make it all the more true to life.” Angel Unawares (1921) was reviewed in The Scotsman, which noted that the lessons taught by would be useful for “[h]ealthy-minded girls,” while the Dundee Courier thought “the account of the many schemes [the protagonist] adopts to do a good turn and smooth out difficulties makes really exciting reading.”

Perhaps her most lasting work is the poem “Very Nearly,” about a child’s possible encounters with fairies, mermaids, and goblins. It appeared in The Year’s at the Spring (1920), an anthology edited by Lettice D’Oyly Walters and illustrated by Irish artist Harry Clarke. Clarke selected “Very Nearly” for a full-page black and white illustration. “Very Nearly” was widely republished in subsequent poetry collections and words to the poem were set to music on at least three occasions between 1926 and 1932, including songs by Henry Geehl and Gerrard Williams.

Platt points out that Scott-Hopper’s output was in keeping with much of the didactic and pious literature written by women for secular and religious magazines of the era: “Scott-Hopper’s vaguely mystical verse containing angels and visions was probably acceptable to editors across the church-party divide because it reflected popular taste. It was also thought suitable for children.”

== Selected works ==
- In the Christmas Firelight: Five Yuletide Stories. Illustrated by Brinsley Le Fanu. (London: Books for the Bairns, 1905).
- The Story of Hiawatha, Re-Told in Prose. Illustrated by Brinsley Le Fanu. (London: Books for the Bairns, 1905).
- Pull the Bobbin! A Garland of Child Verse. Illustrated by Winifred M. Ackroyd. (London: George G. Harrap & Co., 1919).
- Under Sevenshields Castle. Illustrated by Honor C. Appleton. (London: George G. Harrap & Co., 1919).
- Without the Sanctuary and Other Songs of a Northern Singer. (London: A.R. Mowbray & Co., 1919).
- The Camp of Refuge. (London: Aldine Publishing Co., 1920[?]).
- Rock Bottom, A Story for Girls. (London: George G. Harrap & Co., 1920).
- Angel Unawares. (London: George G. Harrap & Co., 1921).
- The Children's Book of Common Prayer. (London: Home Words, 1921).
- In the King's Service. A Course of Fifty-two Lessons Following the Church Calendar. (London: Home Words, 1921).
- Aladdinetta and Co. (London: T. Nelson & Sons, 1923).
- Nick. (London: T. Nelson & Sons, 1924).
- The Man of the House. (London: T. Nelson & Sons, 1924).
- Songs of Faith and Fellowship. London: Faith Press, [1924?].
- Dollie Takes Charge, A Story for Little Girls. (London: T. Nelson & Sons, 1925).
