= Lettice D'Oyly Walters =

English writer and editor (1880–1940)

Lettice D’Oyly Walters (September 24, 1880 – February 3, 1940) was an English writer and editor. In addition to publishing chapbooks of her own poetry, she edited two volumes of poems in collaboration with Irish artists and writers, including The Year’s at the Spring (1920) and Irish Poets of To-day (1921). Later, she founded Swan Press in Chelsea, London.

== Early life ==
Walters was born in Dorchester, Dorset, England on September 24, 1880 to Colonel Charles D’Oyly Harmar (1844-1922) and Alice Mary, née Byas (1848-1924). Her siblings were:

- Fairlie Harmar (1876–1945), painter, Viscountess Harberton
- Charles D'Oyly Walters (1878-1963), later Major D’Oyly Harmar, Royal Marines
- Phillis Cowlard, née Harmar (1889-1966). Phillis was painted by Fairlie Harmar circa 1930.

Walters spent her first twenty years in Ramridge House, a one-hundred-acre estate in Weyhill, Hampshire, where she was educated by a governess. Her sister Fairlie studied at the Slade School of Fine Art. Her brother was educated at Winchester College before enlisting with the Royal Marines.

D’Oyly Walters is often referred to as Irish; however, there is no evidence that she ever lived in Ireland, nor were her parents Irish.

== Personal life ==
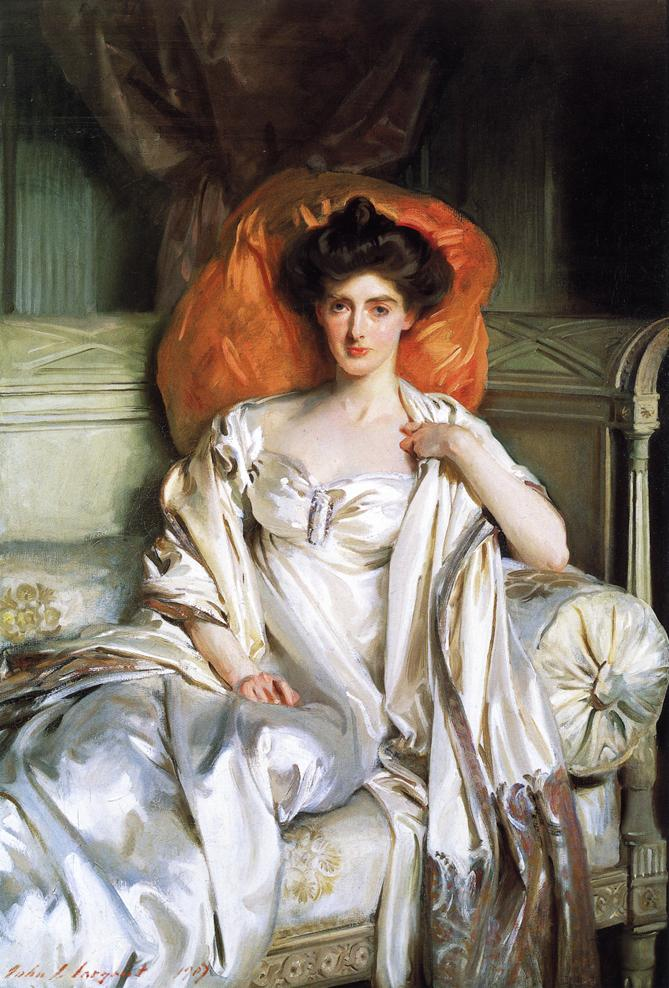
Mrs. Huth Jackson (née Annabel Grant Duff) John Singer Sargent -- American painter 1907.

Lettice married Australian banker Lewis Huth Walters (February 24, 1872 – November 24, 1941) in Weyhill, Hampshire June 1, 1901. Initially living in a flat at 12A Evelyn Mansions, S. W. London, the couple later moved to 5 Swan Walk, Chelsea, London. Lewis shared a partnership in the old London establishment Frederick Huth & Co. with his cousin Frederick Huth Jackson. Frederick's wife Caroline Huth Jackson, society hostess, was painted by John Singer Sargent in 1907. Over time, Lewis became a major art collector, specializing in prints, drawings, and decorative art.

Their only child, Michael Heriot Huth Walters was born 1909. From an early age, he was interested in astronomy. After studying at King's College, University of Cambridge, he won a visiting fellowship to Princeton University. He died of a heart attack on March 26, 1934, at the age of 25. Lettice solicited a series of poems and tributes from friends and family, and published them privately through the Swan Press in a small book simply titled Michael (1935). This was her last recorded publication. She died February 3, 1940, aged 59, having returned to Redenham (Appleshaw), Hampshire, leaving her estate to her sister Phillis.

Lewis died of a heart attack in 1941. His collection of prints and drawings was sold by Christie's in 1942 and appear in the catalogs of major museums around the world, such as the J. Paul Getty Museum, the British Museum, and the Fitzwilliam Museum, Cambridge.

== Selected publications ==
=== Poems ===
The first of Walters's publications was a collection of her own poems titled Speedwell: Dreams and Desires (1917). A reviewer praised Walters for “simple, musical, and gracefully turned pieces.” Another review noted that Walters was a “master of passionate language,” although the reviewer was shocked by her “very decidedly sensuous conception of Love.” Likewise, her volume Forty-Five Poems (1924) received commendation for “exquisite artistry,” the reviewer comparing the work to “a summer brook flowing over green things"; this review referred to Walters as a male author.

=== The Year's at the Spring ===
Intended for the Christmas market of 1920, the illustrated anthology The Year's at the Spring contains 63 poems by 39 authors, as well as 12 full-page color plates and over a dozen black and white tail-piece illustrations by the Irish artist Harry Clarke. There is no record of Walters having met Clarke in person; the collaboration was managed through the auspices of London publisher George Harrap.

The title of the volume comes from a song in the verse drama Pippa Passes (1841) by Robert Browning: “The year's at the spring / And day's at the morn.” In his introduction to the anthology, the poet, bookseller, and editor Harold Monro commented that the anthology was “readable” because it didn't deal with “big themes” of the day, such as the recently concluded First World War and ongoing action related to Women's Suffrage. Yet a number of contributions were from war poets, among them Rupert Brooke ("The Soldier"), Edward Wyndham Tennant (“Home Thoughts in Laventie”), Julian Grenfell (“Into Battle”), and Robert Ernest Vernéde (“A Petition”). The anthology also includes a number of women poets, such as Mary Coleridge, Frances Cornford, Queenie Scott-Hopper, and Charlotte Mary Mew.

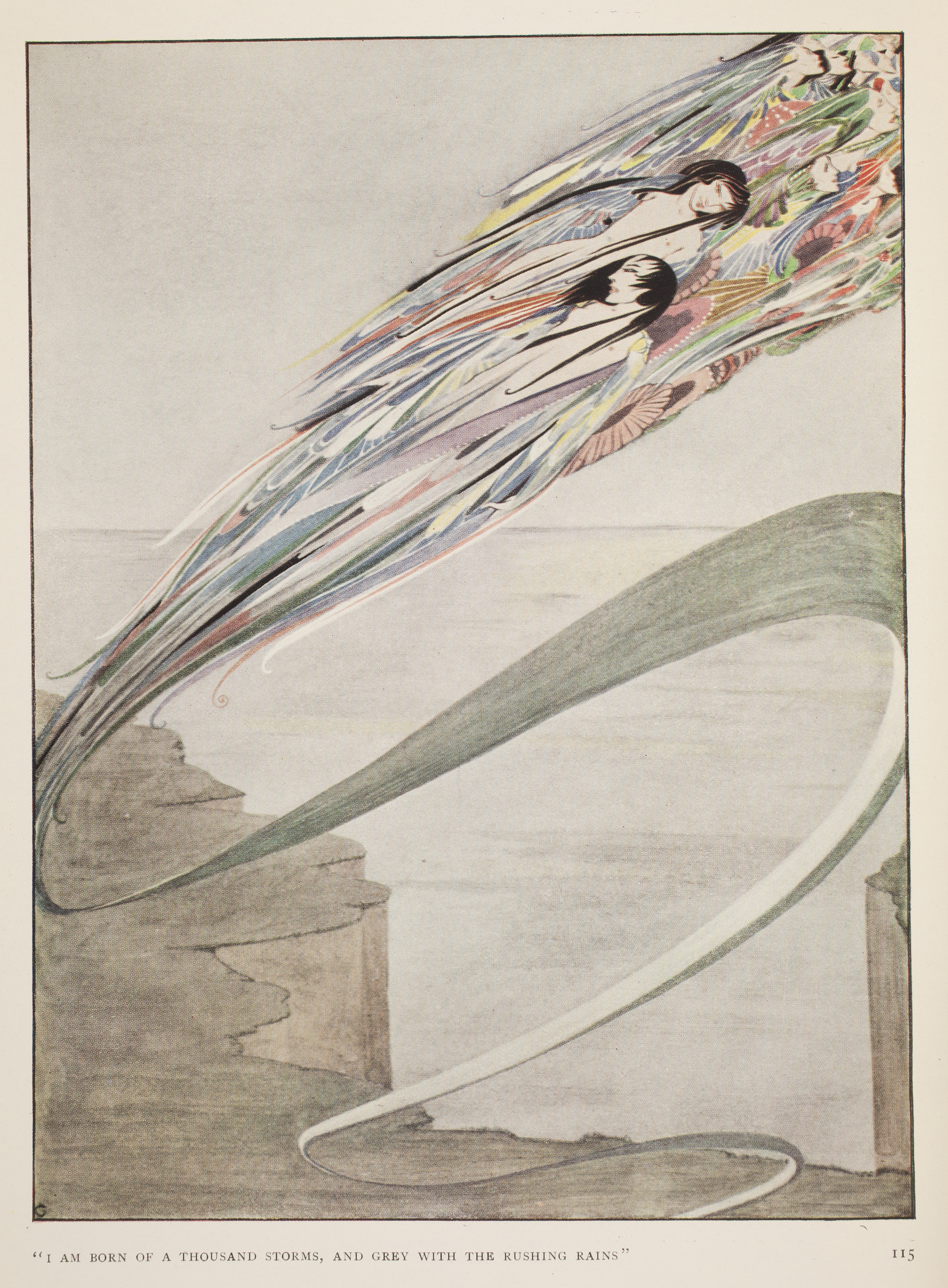
Harry Clarke, full color plate, illustration for Lettice D'Oyly Walters's poem "All is spirit and part of me." Published in the anthology The Year's at the Spring

The Studio praised the book as “attractively got up” and singled out Clarke as “an artist of marked individuality, and the imaginative faculty which he possesses in a high degree is well shown in these drawings.” Clarke's biographer Nicola Gordon Bowe posits that unillustrated versions of the text marketed as An Anthology of Recent Poetry (1920) were sold prior to the release of the illustrated gift book in order to offset copyright permissions for the poetry and fees for the illustrations. The poetic contents of The Year's at the Spring and An Anthology of Recent Poetry are identical.

=== Irish Poets of To-day ===
For the anthology Irish Poets of To-day (1921), Walters collected 78 poems drawn from previously published work of 34 writers. She dedicated the collection to George William Russell (pseudonym Æ), who contributed six poems to the book. The book includes seven poems by William Butler Yeats. Three executed leaders of the Easter Rising are represented by their poetry: Joseph Plunkett, Patrick Pearse, and Thomas MacDonagh. As with The Year’s at the Spring, she included several female poets, among them Eva Gore-Booth, Winifred Letts, Dora Sigerson, and Katharine Tynan. The work was not reviewed extensively, and one reviewer noted it only included minor poets and sentimental verses.

=== Swan Press ===
In 1926, Lettice, her son Michael, and printer, engraver and painter Maureen Patey Eyre Proudman established the Swan Press, listing the Walters' home address at 5 Swan Walk, Chelsea. The press published no new work, but reissued previously published material. The Sybil Campbell Library, which owns many of the books, notes that Swan Press “produced limited editions, usually of 100 numbered copies, in fine print, handset in a variety of typefaces by L.D.O. Walters and M.P. Eyre, hand pressed by H. Gage-Cole on handmade paper, bound by hand, examples of fine craftsmanship.” Margaret Roake writes, “Since the foremost aim of the Swan Press was the production of fine typography, there was no standard format to the volumes. Each came in a size, typeface and style appropriate to the particular subject.” Swan Press ceased publication with the memorial volume Michael for Michael H. H. Walters. Contributors to the memorial received a copy of Swan Press's edition of Ten Fables by Robert Lewis Stevenson, illustrated by Rachel Russell (1928). Swan Press's editions were presented to the Sybil Campbell Library in memory of Michael Heriot Huth Walters. According to the library, “no public repository has records of the Swan Press.”

== Published works ==
Speedwell: Dreams and Desires (London: Erskine MacDonald, 1918)

Turquoise (London: Sands & Co., 1919)

The Year’s at the Spring: An Anthology of Recent Poetry (London: G. G. Harrap & Co., 1920). A book with a similar title, The Year's at the Spring: An Anthology of Best-Loved Poems (Dublin: Gill & MacMillan, 2013), was published with a new table of contents, deleting many of the original selections, adding poems by Irish writers, and listing Harry Clarke as the author.

Irish Poets of To-Day; an Anthology (London: T. Fisher Unwin, 1921)

A Complete Guide to Wiltshire (London: Sach & Co., 1921)

Poems (London: C. W. Daniel, 1922)

Forty-Five Poems (London: Selwyn & Blount, 1924)

Michael, A Volume of Poems and Tributes to the Memory of Michael Heriot Huth Walters (London: Swan Press, 1934)

== See also ==
- Fairlie Harmar
- Harry Clarke
- The Year’s at the Spring
