= Harry Clarke – Darkness in Light =

Harry Clarke - Darkness in Light
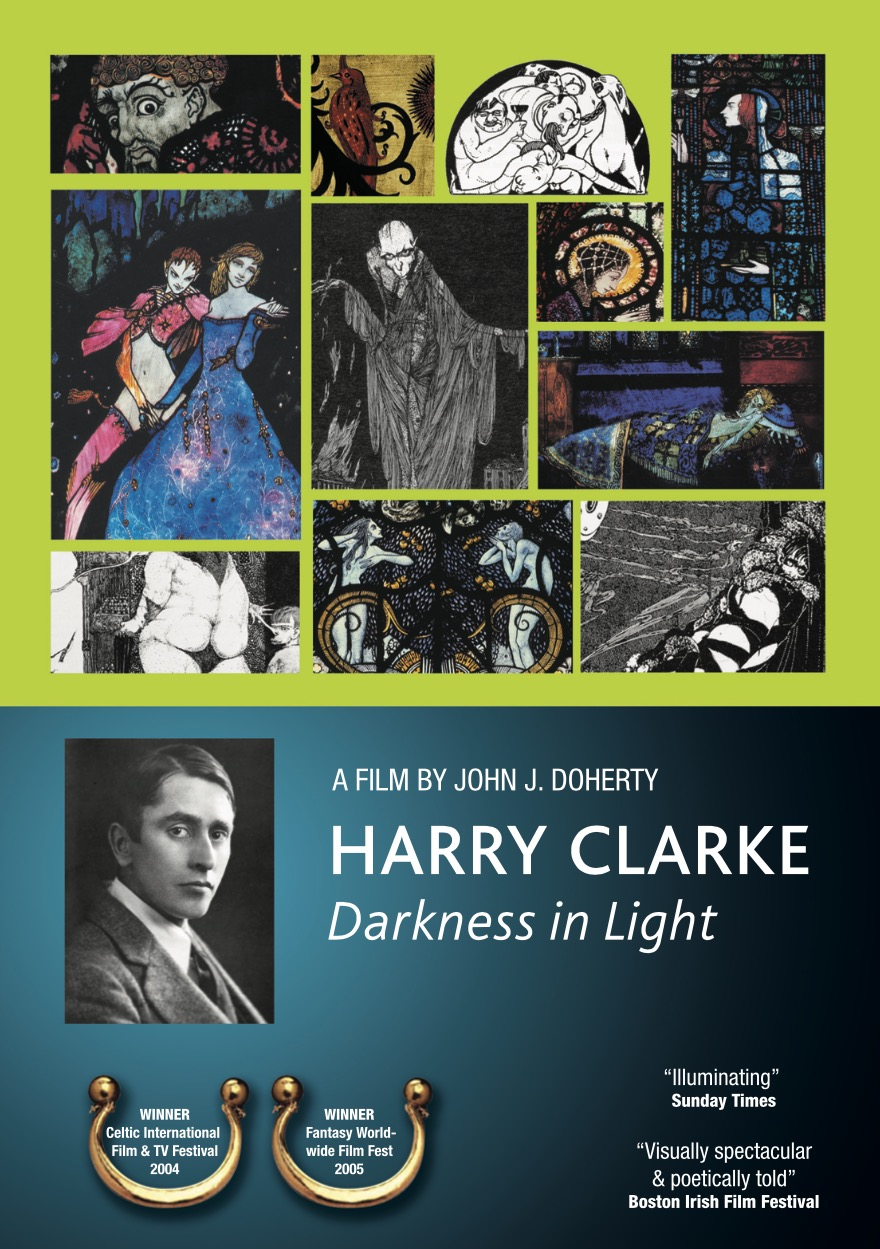
- Official cover artwork for the film Harry Clarke: Darkness in Light
- Directed by: John J Doherty
- Written by: John J Doherty
- Produced by: Catherine Lyons
- Starring: Harry Clarke
- Narrated by: John J Doherty
- Cinematography: Steve O'Reilly; John J Doherty
- Edited by: Declan McGrath
- Music by: Cyril Dunnion; Gerard Meaney
- Release date: 2003
- Running time: 52 minutes
- Country: Ireland
- Languages: English; Irish

Harry Clarke – Darkness in Light is a documentary film originally released in 2003 (Irish-language version titled Harry Clarke - Dorchadas i Solas).

== Synopsis ==
Filmmaker John J Doherty traces the life and work of the Irish artist, book illustrator and stained glass artist Harry Clarke (1889–1931) with major contributions from his biographer Nicola Gordon Bowe as well as many stained glass artists, poets and historians. The film takes the artist's work in stained glass, which was mainly religious an ethereal, and in book illustration, which was mainly dark and fantastical, as the basis for its title and tells a story of talent, struggle, success and the censorship of his final masterpiece 'the Geneva Window'. Harry Clarke brought his expertise in working in fine decorative detail in glass to his book illustrations, most notably in the tales of Hans Christian Andersen and Edgar Allan Poe where he is compared to Aubrey Beardsley and which are featured in the film and paralleled with German Expressionist cinema of the time. The film was made in conjunction with the Irish Film Board and national broadcaster TG4.

== Awards ==
This film won the Best Arts Documentary award at the 2004 Celtic International Film Festival.
This film won the Best Documentary award at the 2005 Worldwide International Fantasy Film Festival - Toronto

== Sources ==
- Nicola Gordon Bowe. 1994. The Life and Work of Harry Clarke (Irish Academic Press)
- TG4 awards 2004
- Celtic Media Festival awards 1980–2010
