= Maureen Patey Eyre Proudman =

English painter

Maureen Patey (Eyre) Proudman (18 May 1906 – 11 November 1988) was an English designer and painter.

== Life ==
Eyre studied fine art at the British Academy school in Rome and at the Design School at the Royal College of Art under Ernest Tristram and Reco Capey from 1925 to 1928. Eyre specialized in mural and decorative painting, textile design, printing and wood engraving.

She married Philip Proudman in Singapore in March 1932. They had two sons.

In 1938, Maureen and Philip Proudman commissioned a pioneering international style house with fully glazed elevations and balconies overlooking Richmond Park at 26 Bessborough Road in Roehampton by Colin Lucas of Connell, Ward and Lucas. The home was profiled in the AA Journal in November 1956.

She married Ernest W. Lovely in October 1974 and thereafter lived in Winchester, England.

== Career ==
=== Design ===
With Lettice D’Oyly Walters and Michael Huth Walters, Eyre established the Swan Press in Chelsea. The press created limited editions of previously published material. Margaret Roake writes that the press emphasized typography and editions were “hand pressed by H. Gage-Cole on handmade paper, bound by hand, examples of fine craftsmanship.”

In 1928, Eyre co-established the design studio Eyre and Martin in London. She executed commercial commissions in interior design, murals, and pottery, as well as carpet and textile designs for leading textile manufacturers. In 1930, Eyre and Martin were commissioned by Reco Capey to create several large murals for the front of the new Yardley shop on Bond Street in London.

=== Painting ===
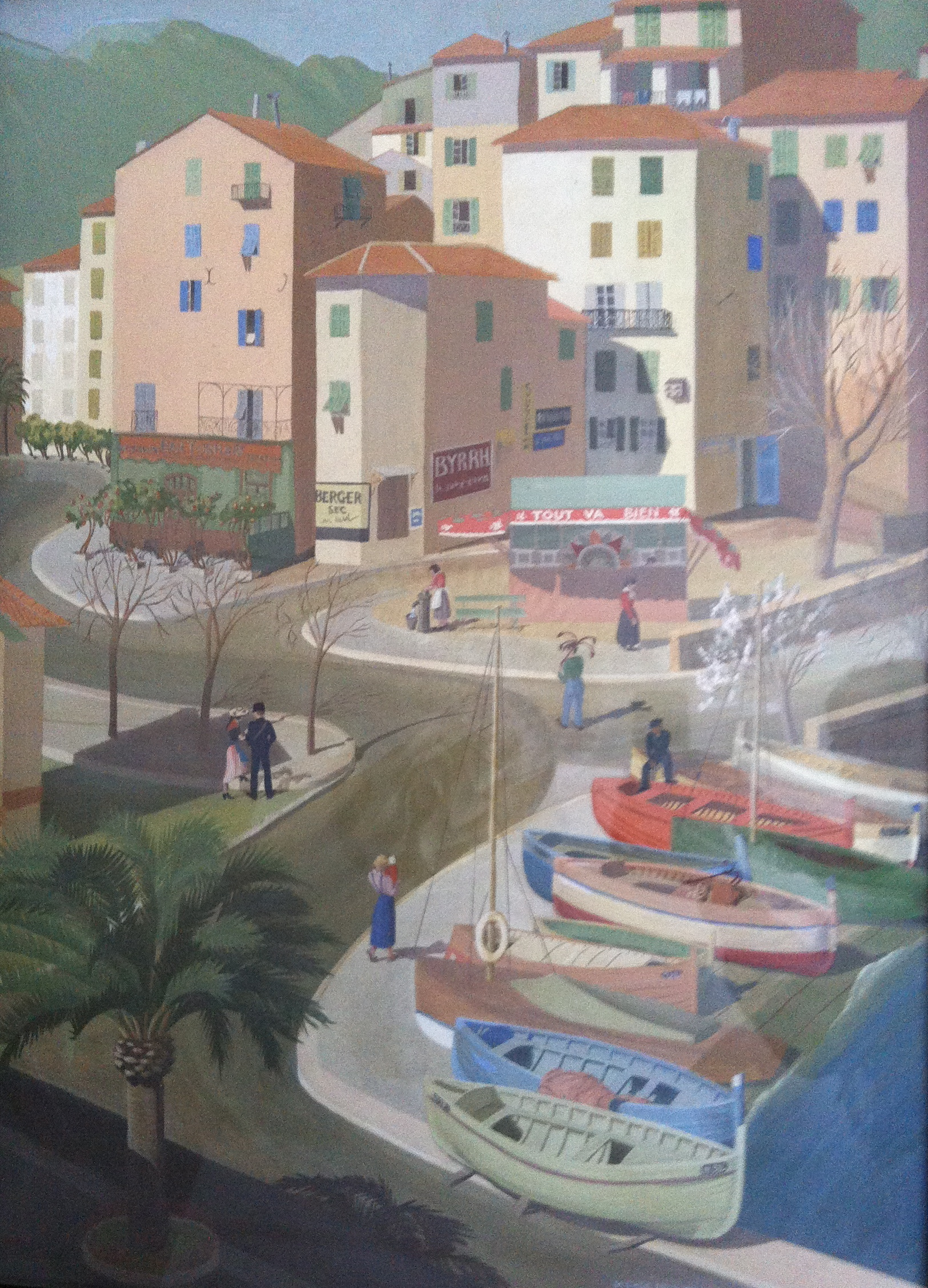
Egg tempera Painting by Maureen Patey (Eyre) Proudman circa 1948

Eyre exhibited paintings at the Leicester Galleries and the Walker Art Gallery. She was awarded first prize in textile design at the North East Coast Exhibition in 1929.

In October 1948, Proudman (then using her married name) exhibited three paintings at the Royal Academy in the RCAA group show: Mentone ‘tout va Bien’, Spring Morning, and Hollyhocks. The Scotsman had this to say of her work:

Two very personal and very decorative painters are Reco Capey … and Maureen Proudman, whose beautiful organized Spring Morning is worthy of detailed appreciation.

=== Textiles ===
Proudman taught textile printing at Harrogate School of Art.

=== Printing & Engraving ===
Proudman created many small wood engravings the earliest dated 1929 and the latest 1948.

Proudman designed travel posters for Indian Railways, working for the Ministry of Public works in Jodhpur. An example is JODHPUR / SEE INDIA dated 1934 and printed by G. Claridge and Co. Ltd., Bombay.
