= Geneva Window =

8-panel stained glass work by Harry Clarke

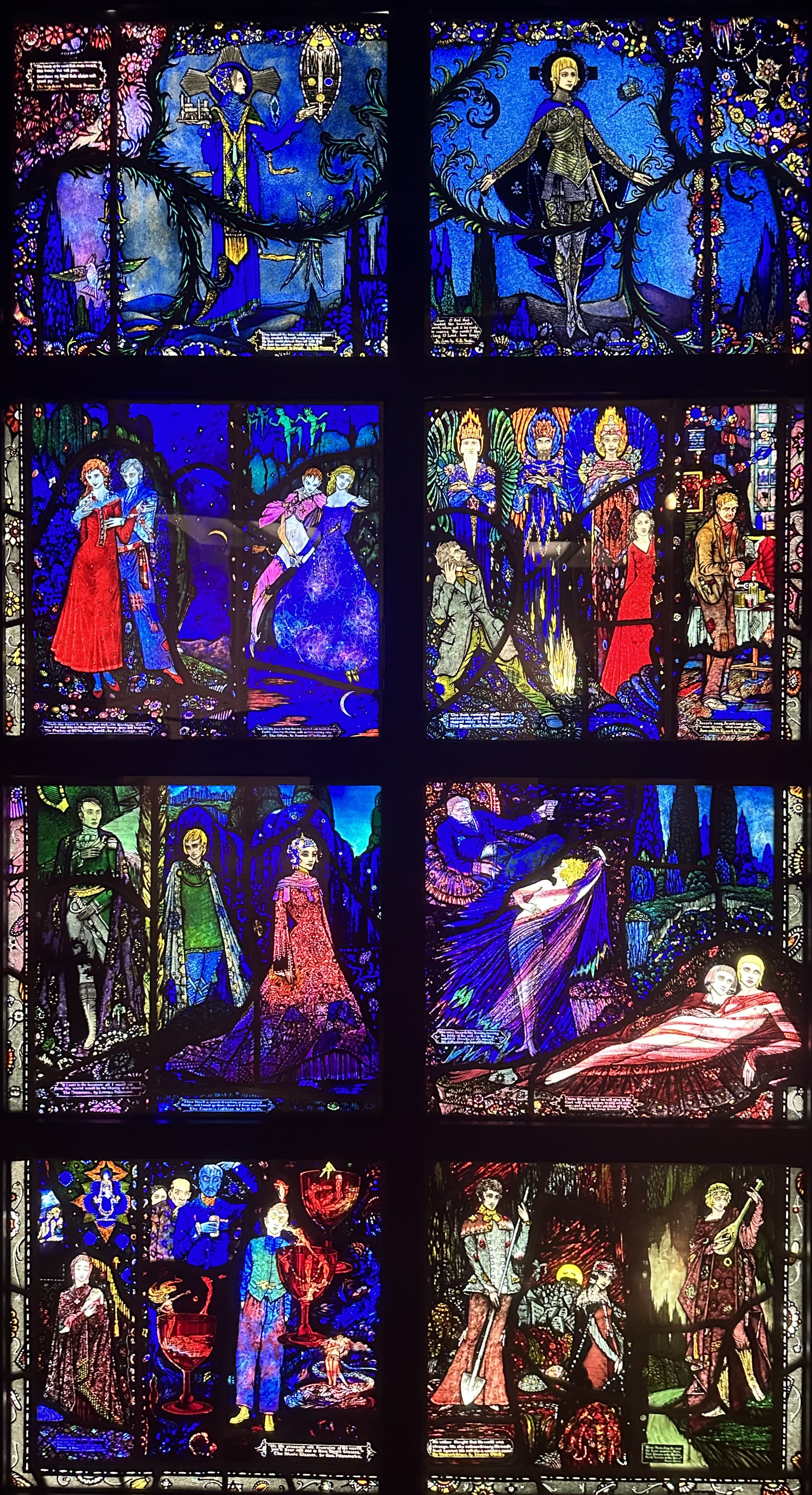
- Artist: Harry Clarke
- Year: 1927 to 1930
- Medium: Stained glass
- Subject: characters from 15 works by Irish authors, poets and dramatists
- Dimensions: 181.6 cm × 101.6 cm (71.5 in × 40.0 in)
- Location: Wolfsonian-FIU Museum, Miami, Florida, US
- Owner: Mitchell Wolfson Jr.

The Geneva Window is a stained glass window consisting of eight panels, created by Harry Clarke from 1927 to 1930. It was originally commissioned by the Irish Free State government for the International Labour Building of the League of Nations in Geneva. However, it was rejected, by W. T. Cosgrave and others, for being "offensive", "too provocative" and "unrepresentative". It was instead installed in Government Buildings on Merrion Square before being purchased by Clarke's widow, Margaret, in 1933 for its original cost of IR£450. The window was exhibited at the Hugh Lane Gallery in Dublin and by the Fine Art Society in London before being acquired by Mitchell Wolfson Jr. in 1988.

== Creation ==
Clarke was commissioned to produce the window to represent the Irish Free State among other pieces of art from each League of Nations member state. He was free to choose the subject matter, choosing representations of literary characters from 15 Irish texts. The production of the window was hampered by Clarke's struggle with tuberculosis.

== Panels ==
Each panel features a quote or stanza from the featured literary work. Among the subjects are nudes, sex work, people suffering poverty, and drunkenness.

The Wayfarer and The Story Brought by Brigit
The first panel represents Patrick Pearse's The Wayfarer and Lady Gregory's The Story Brought by Brigit features Saint Brigid.
St. Joan
Joan of Arc as featured in George Bernard Shaw's play St. Joan is depicted in the second panel.
The Playboy of the Western World and The Others
The characters of Christy Mahon and Pegeen Mike, from John Millington Synge's The Playboy of the Western World and fairies from Seumas O'Sullivan's poem The Others are featured in the third panel.
Demi-Gods and Juno and the Paycock
Three Demigods as depicted in James Stephens' novel Demi-Gods, and Joxer Daly, from Seán O'Casey's Juno and the Paycock is depicted in the fourth panel.
The Dreamers and The Countess Cathleen
Irish Republican Robert Emmet as characterised in Lennox Robinson's ode The Dreamers, and the title character from W. B. Yeats' The Countess Cathleen are depicted in the fifth panel.
Mr. Gilhooley and Deirdre
The sixth panel features the title characters of Deirdre, by George William Russell, and Mr. Gilhooley, by Liam O'Flaherty. The original panel was removed due to damage, but sold separately. The Hugh Lane Gallery acquired the piece from the Fine Art Society, London, for UK£35,000 in 2015.
A Cradle Song and The Magic Glasses
A peasant woman from Padraic Colum's A Cradle Song and the suspected changeling Jamoney Shanahan from George Fitzmaurice's The Magic Glasses feature in the seventh panel.
The Weaver's Grave and Chamber Music

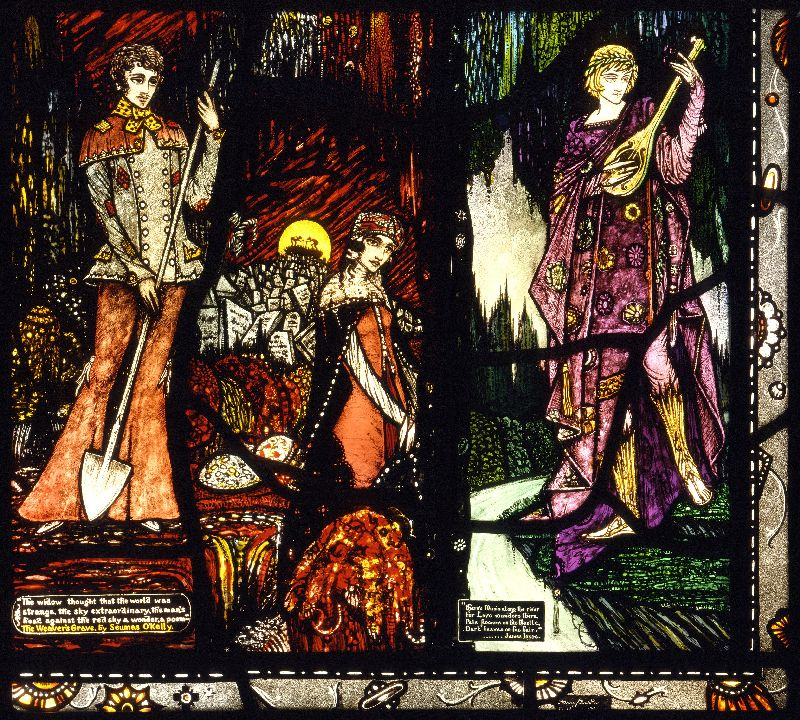
The eighth panel

A gravedigger and the weaver's widow from Seumas O'Kelly's The Weaver's Grave and a bard representing James Joyce's Chamber Music are featured in the eight panel.

== Assessment in officialdom ==
Upon completion the window was installed in Government Buildings in Dublin. Free State officials, including President of the Executive Council W. T. Cosgrave, judged the window to be too controversial in nature to be approved, by virtue of the subject matter more than the very images. Despite Clarke's appeals, Cosgrove described it as a "most remarkable and successful artistic achievement", but feared that the inclusion of certain authors might give "grave offence to many of our people.". The inclusion of Protestant authors also harmed the piece's position as a statement of the Celtic Revival.

Bishop of Killaloe Michael Fogarty was "much impressed by the work", objected to Seumas O'Sullivan's inclusion, but felt that to replace it would be detrimental to the work as a whole. Ultimately government's fear of adverse public opinion for the art or the subject of the art determined that the work was not sent to Geneva, and was only purchased after Clarke's death. It was later sold to Clarke's widow Margaret in 1933.

== Legacy ==
The work was the subject of a documentary, The Geneva Window: Through a Glass Darkly, by Irish actor and comedian Ardal O'Hanlon.
