= Harry Clarke =

Irish artist (1889–1931)

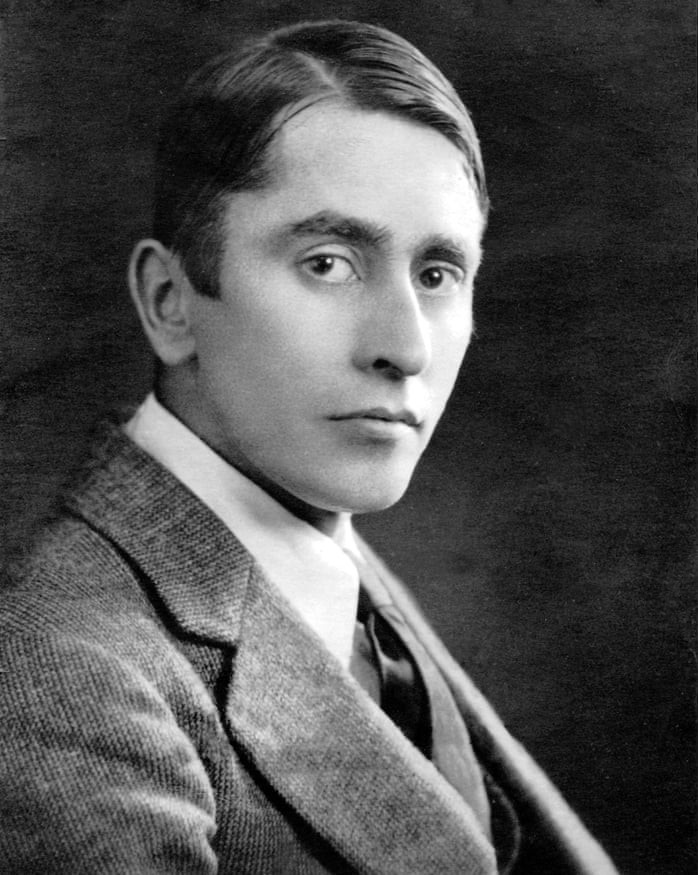
- Born: Henry Patrick Clarke; 17 March 1889; Dublin, Ireland
- Died: 6 January 1931 (aged 41); Chur, Switzerland
- Resting place: Chur (disinterred in 1946 and reburied in an unknown communal grave)
- Education: Dublin Metropolitan School of Art
- Known for: Stained glass and book illustration
- Notable work: Geneva Window
- Movement: Arts and Crafts
- Spouse: Margaret Clarke

Henry Patrick Clarke (17 March 1889 – 6 January 1931) was an Irish stained-glass artist and book illustrator. Born in Dublin, he was a leading figure in the Irish Arts and Crafts movement.

His work was influenced by both the Art Nouveau and Art Deco movements. His stained glass was particularly informed by the French Symbolist movement.

== Early life ==
Harry Patrick Clarke was born on 17 March 1889, the younger son and third child of Joshua Clarke and Brigid (née MacGonigal) Clarke. Joshua Clarke was a church decorator who moved to Dublin from Leeds in 1877 and started a decorating business, Joshua Clarke & Sons, which later incorporated a stained glass division. Through his work with his father, Clarke was exposed to many schools of art but Art Nouveau in particular.

Clarke was educated at the Model School in Marlborough Street, Dublin and Belvedere College, which he left in 1905. He was devastated by the death of his mother in 1903 when he was only 14 years old. Clarke was then apprenticed into his father's studio and attended evening classes in the Metropolitan College of Art and Design. His The Consecration of St Mel, Bishop of Longford, by St Patrick won the gold medal for stained glass work in the 1910 Board of Education National Competition. He won the gold medal for stained glass at the 1911, 1912, and 1913 South Kensington National Competitions. He also exhibited at the 1912 International Art Congress in Dresden, Germany, and the 1914 Exposition des Arts Décoratifs de G. Bretagne et d'Irlande at the Louvre in Paris.

At the art school in Dublin, Clarke met fellow artist and teacher, Margaret Crilley. They married on 31 October 1914 and moved into a flat at 33 North Frederick Street. In subsequent years the Clarkes lived in various locations in Dublin, including a semi-detached house in Cabra in which Margaret Clarke painted her husband at work. The Clarkes had three children, Michael, David, and Ann.

== Career ==
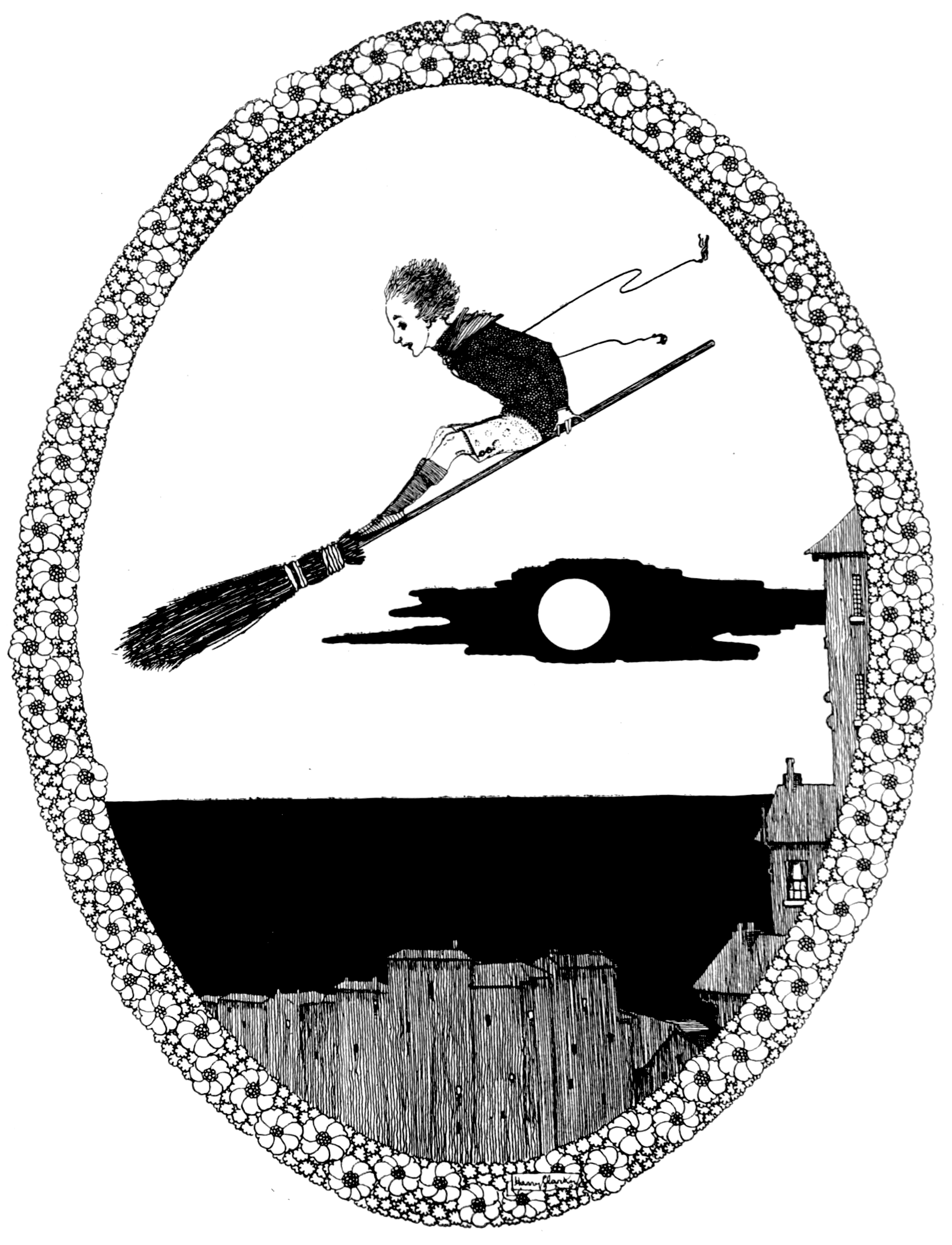
Illustration for The year's at the spring; an anthology of recent poetry (1920)

=== Book illustration ===
Clarke briefly moved to London to seek work as a book illustrator. Picked up by London publisher Harrap, he started with two commissions which were never completed: Samuel Taylor Coleridge's The Rime of the Ancient Mariner (much of his work on which was destroyed during the 1916 Easter Rising in Dublin) and an illustrated edition of Alexander Pope's The Rape of the Lock.

Clarke was commissioned by the Committee of the Irish National War Memorial in 1919 to illustrate the Ireland's Memorial Records 1914-1918, a roll of honour for the 49,435 Irish who died during World War I. Illustrations for the 8 volumes were completed in 1922 and published in 1923, and a set is on display in the Irish National War Memorial Gardens. 100 copies of the book were distributed to cathedrals and libraries across Ireland and to other Allied countries. Each page features a large four-sided border of black and white illustrations by Clarke.

Difficulties with these projects made Fairy Tales by Hans Christian Andersen his first printed work, in 1916. It included 16 colour plates and more than 24 halftone illustrations. This was followed by illustrations for an edition of Edgar Allan Poe's Tales of Mystery & Imagination: the first version of that title was restricted to halftone illustrations, while a second with eight colour plates and more than 24 halftone images was published in 1923.

This 1923 edition made his reputation as a book illustrator, during the golden age of gift-book illustration in the first quarter of the twentieth century. It was followed by editions of The Years at the Spring, with 12 colour plates and more than 14 monotone images; (Lettice D'Oyly Walters, ed., 1920), Charles Perrault's Fairy Tales of Perrault, and Goethe's Faust, with eight colour plates and more than 70 halftone and duotone images (New York: Hartsdale House, 1925). The last of these is his most famous work, prefiguring the imagery of 1960s psychedelia. Two of his most sought-after titles are promotional booklets for Jameson Irish Whiskey: A History of a Great House (1924, and subsequent reprints) and Elixir of Life (1925), which was written by Geofrey Warren. His final book, Selected Poems of Algernon Charles Swinburne, was published in 1928.

=== Stained glass ===
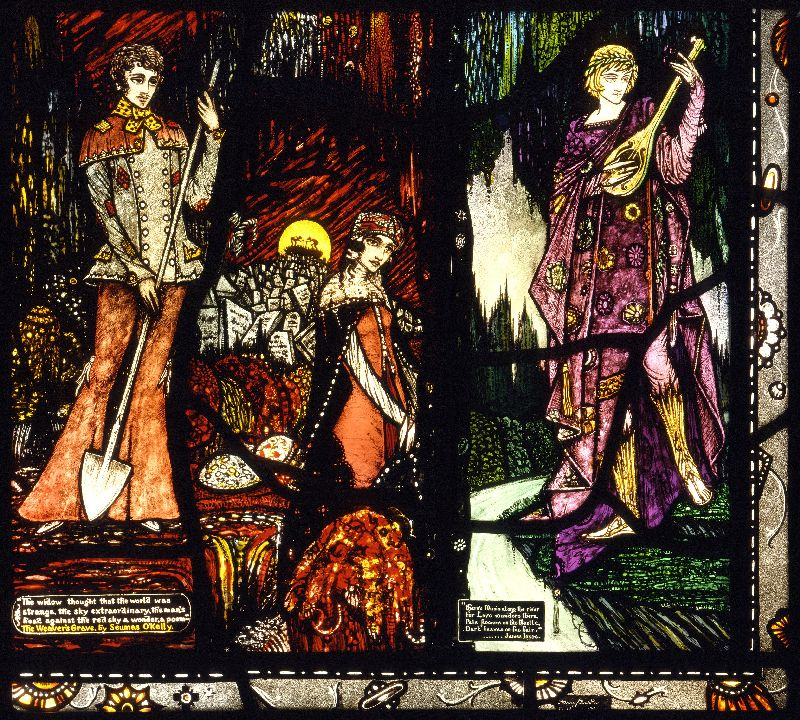
Geneva Window, 1930

Clarke produced more than 130 windows; he and his brother Walter had taken over his father's studio after his death in 1921. His glass is distinguished by the finesse of its drawing and his use of rich colours, and innovative integration of the window leading as part of the overall design, originally inspired by an early visit to see the stained glass of the Cathedral of Chartres. He was especially fond of deep blues. Clarke's use of heavy lines in his black-and-white book illustrations echoes his glass techniques.

Clarke's stained glass work includes many religious windows, but also much secular stained glass. Highlights of the former include his first and finest work - the 11 windows of the Honan Chapel in University College Cork; of the latter, a window illustrating John Keats' The Eve of St. Agnes (now in the Hugh Lane Municipal Gallery in Dublin) and the Geneva Window, created for the Centre William Rappard in Geneva, Switzerland (now in the Wolfsonian Museum, Miami, Florida, US). Perhaps his most seen works were the windows he made for Bewley's Café on Dublin's Grafton Street, which were subject to court proceedings in 2022 in a dispute between landlord and tenant over ownership, as RGRE v Bewley's.

== Later years and death ==
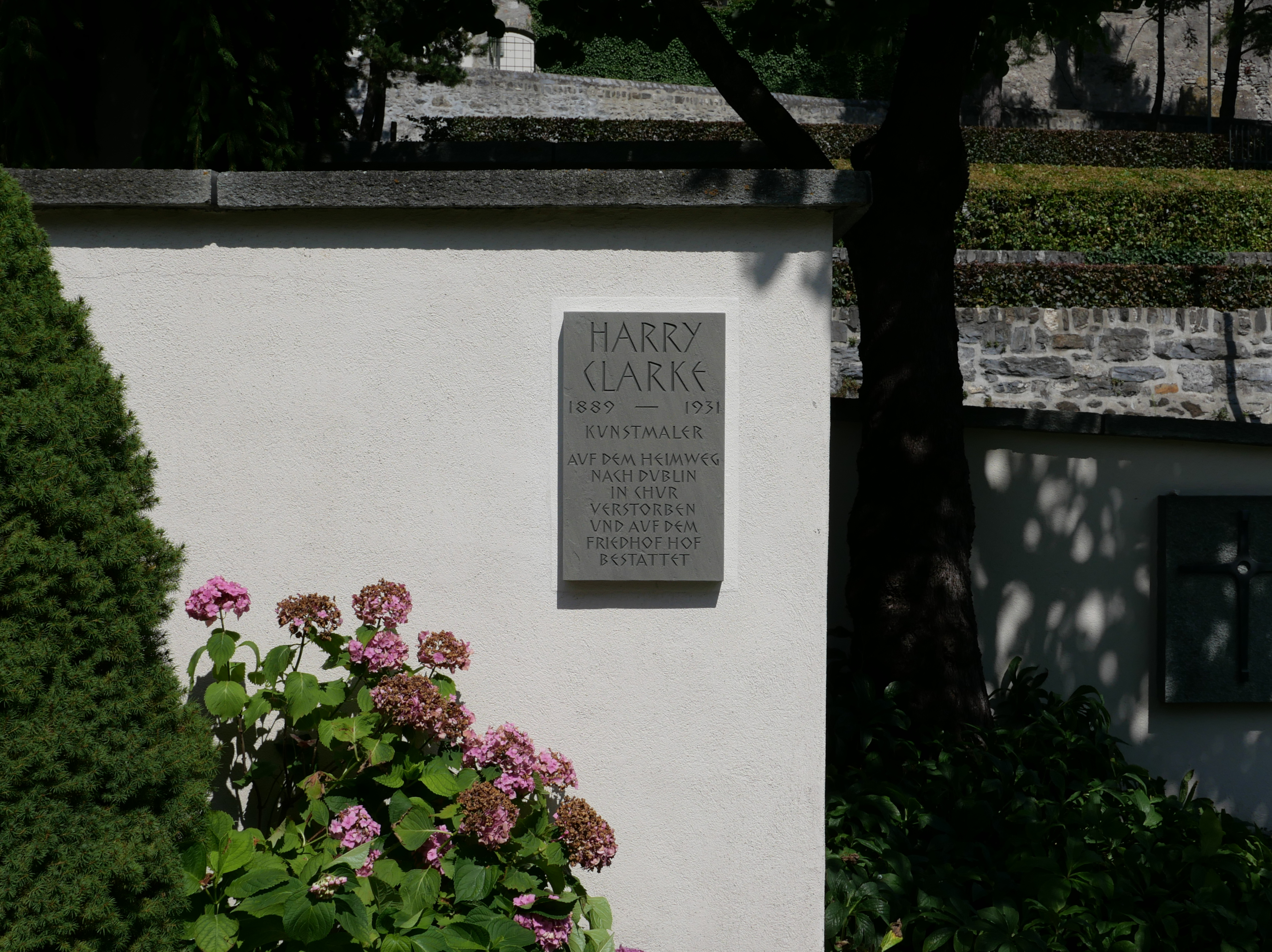
Commemorative plaque for Clarke at the Hof cemetery in Chur, Graubünden, Switzerland

Both Harry and his brother Walter were plagued with ill health, in particular problems with their lungs. Clarke was diagnosed with tuberculosis in 1929, and went to a sanatorium in Davos, Switzerland. Fearing that he would die abroad, he began his journey back to Dublin in 1931, but died on 6 January 1931 in Chur where he was buried. A headstone was erected, but local law required that the family pledge to maintain the grave 15 years after the death. This was not explained to the Clarke family and Harry Clarke's remains were disinterred in 1946 and reburied in a communal grave.

== Legacy ==
In 2019 a bridge in Cabra, Dublin, was renamed "Harry Clarke Bridge" in his honour.

In 2026, a plaque marking Clarke's birthplace was unveiled on North Frederick Street in Dublin.

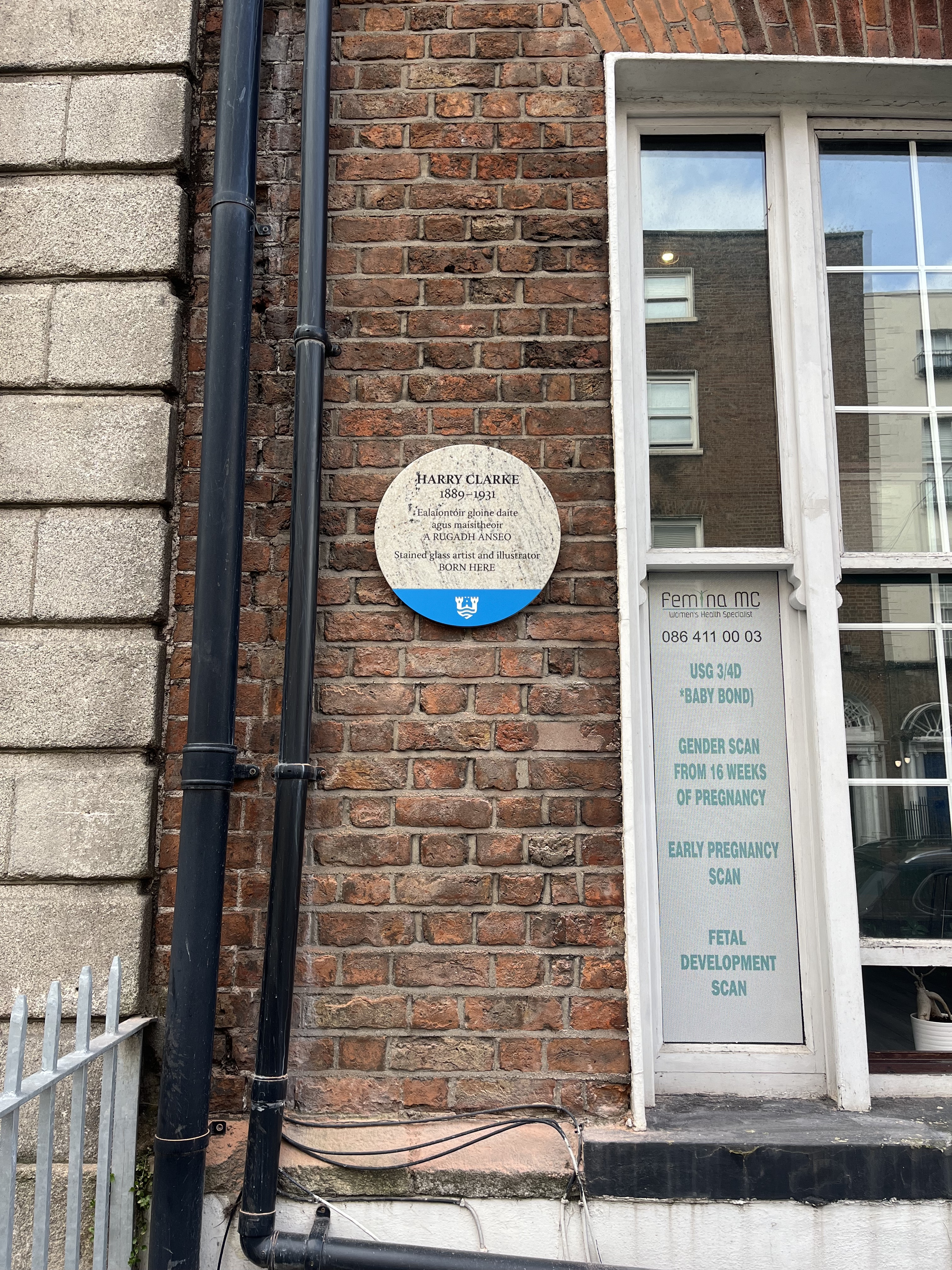
A plaque marking Harry Clarke's Birthplace unveiled in March 2026 at 33 North Frederick Street, Dublin

== Gallery ==
=== Stained glass ===
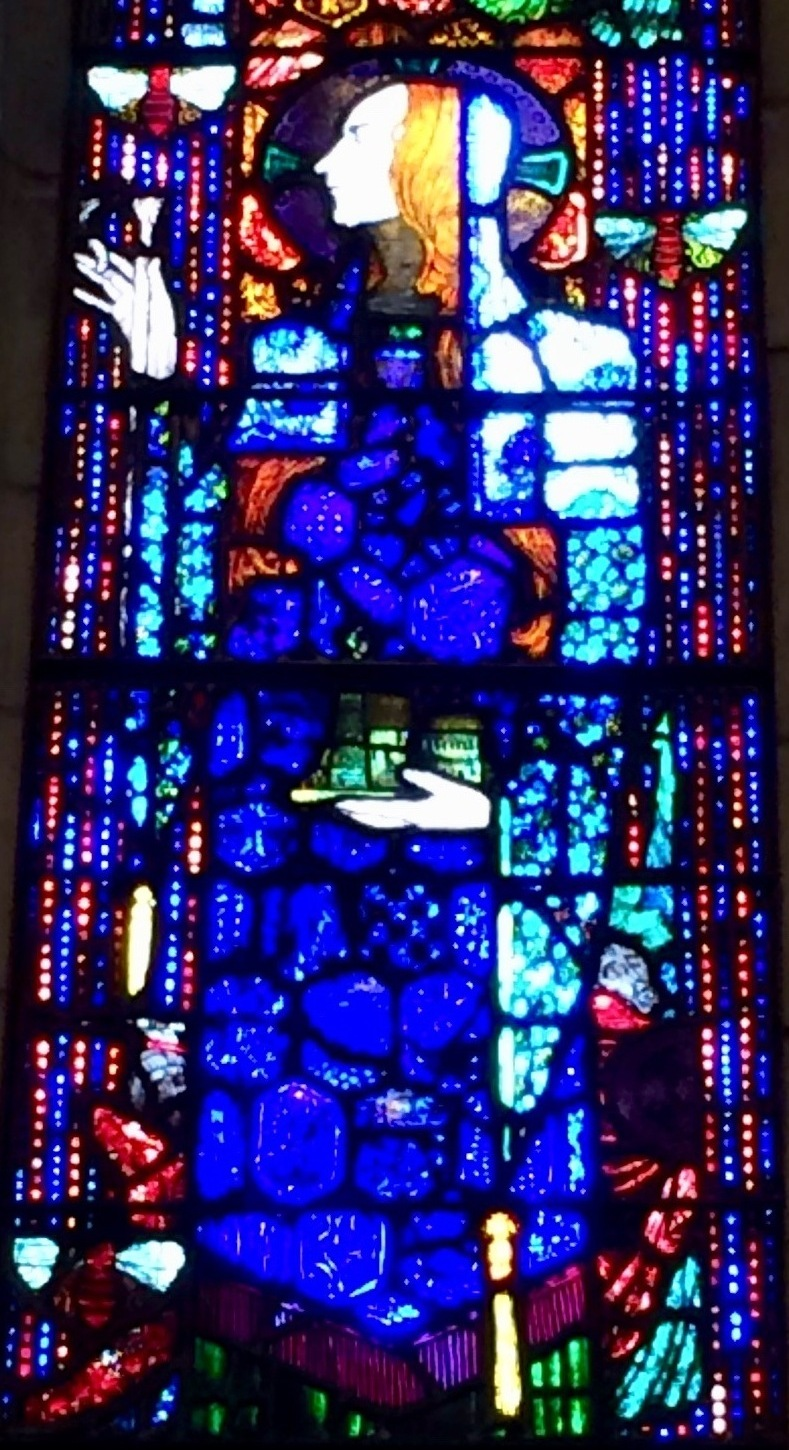
The Saint Gobnait window, Honan Chapel, Cork, 1916

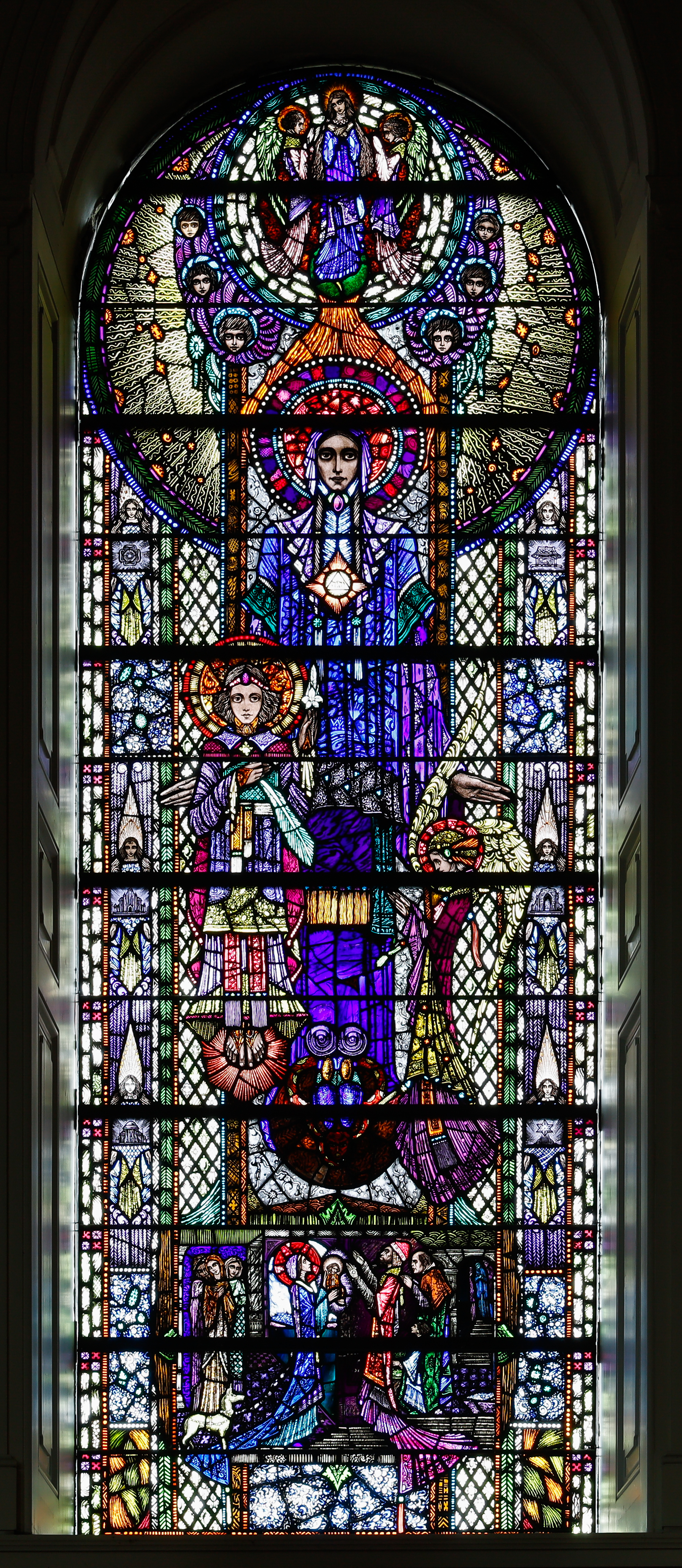
St Anne and Mary, St Mel's Cathedral, Longford, 1932

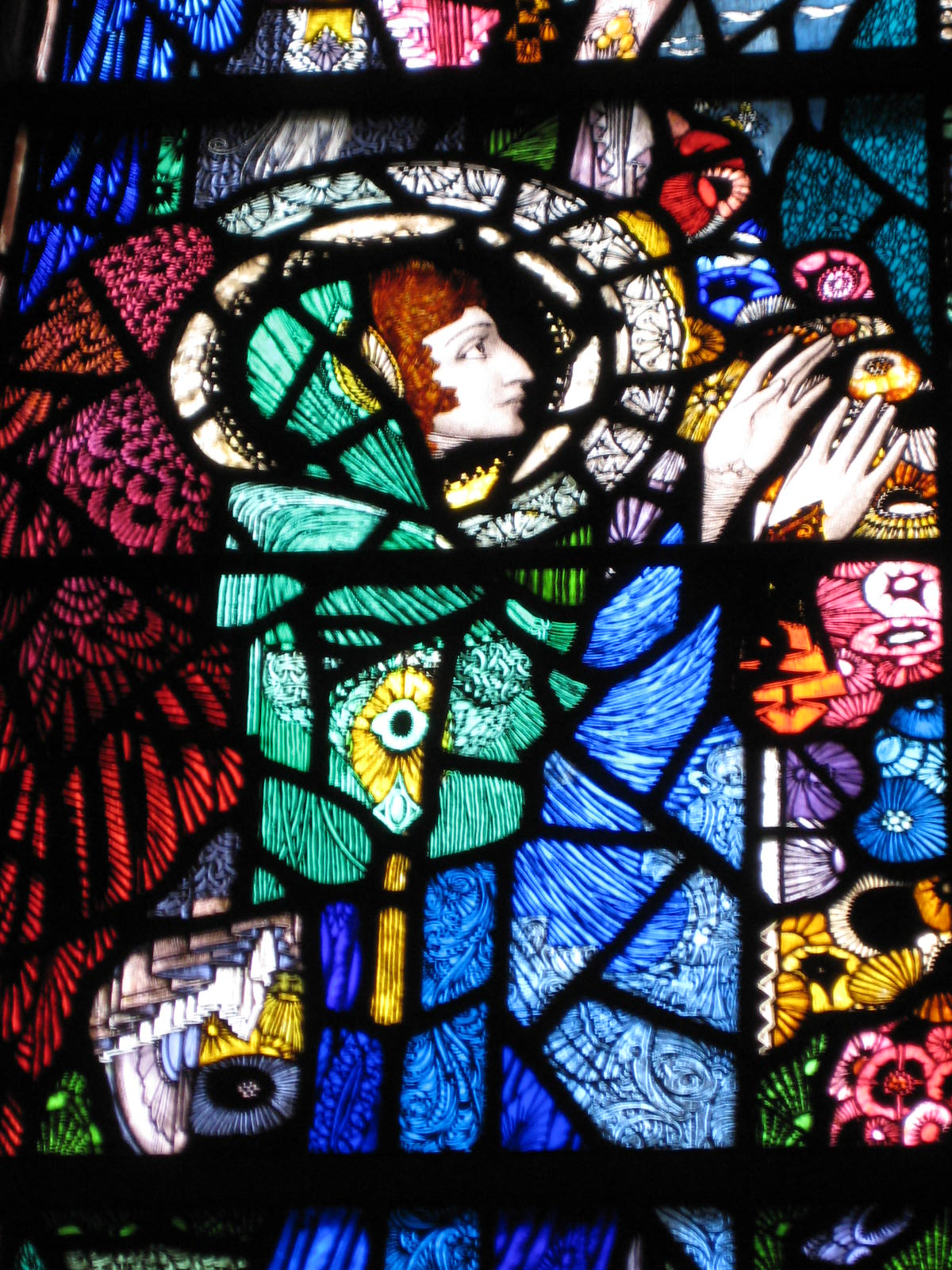
Chapel of the Sacred Heart, Dingle, The Baptism of Jesus, 1922–24

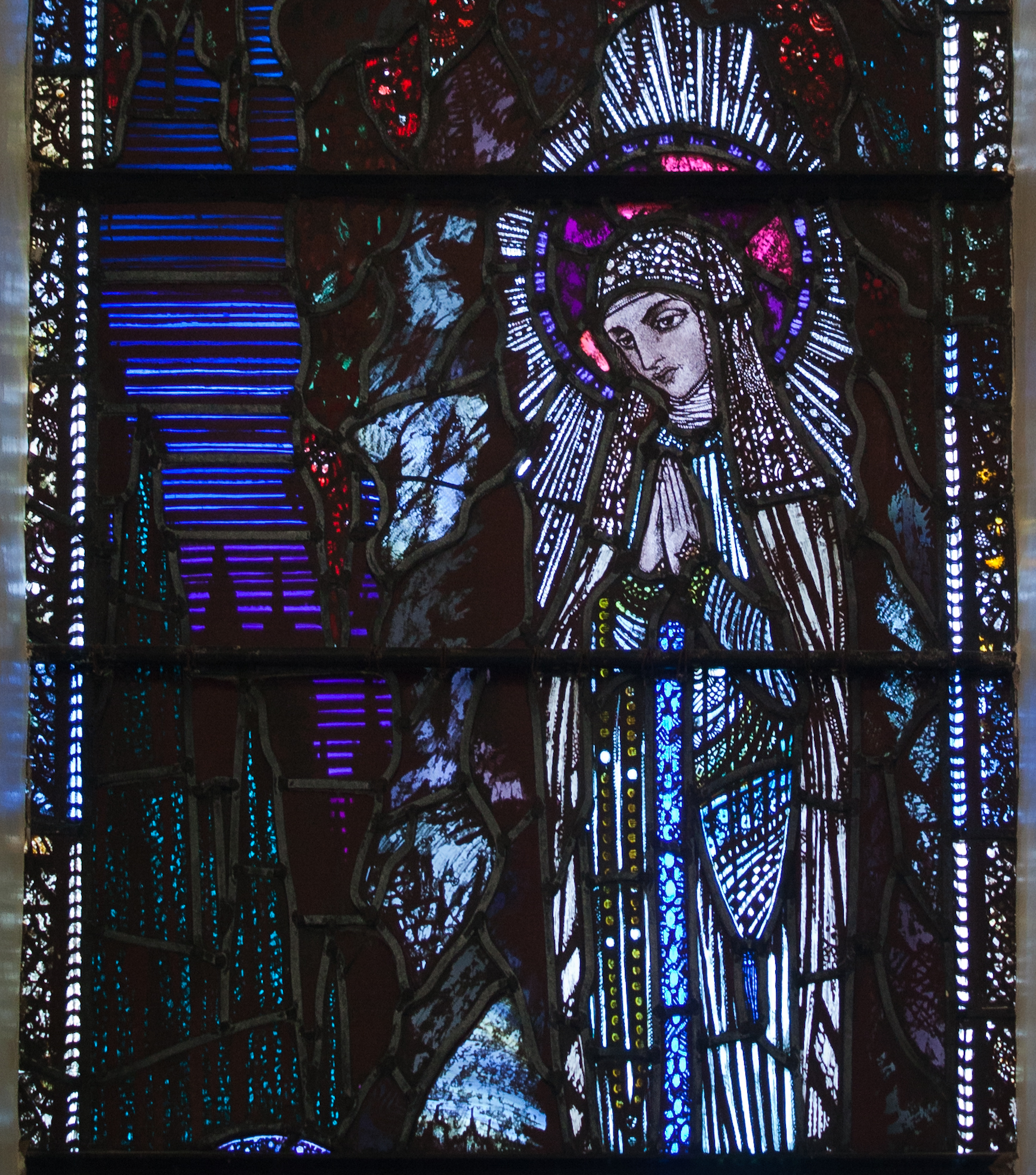
Vision of Bernadette at Lourdes, Church of Saint John the Baptist, Duhill, County Tipperary, 1925

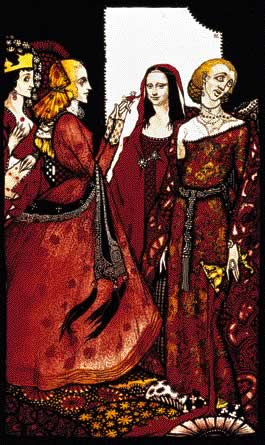
Queens whose finger once did stir men ("Queens"), 1917

=== Illustrations ===
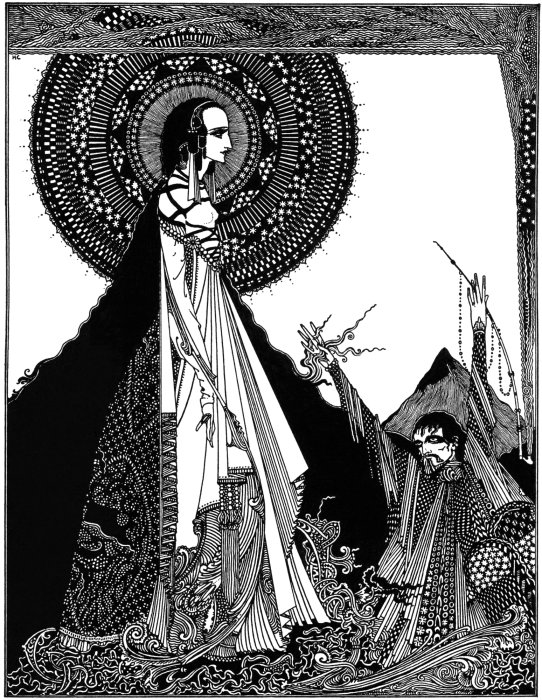
Illustration for Edgar Allan Poe's "Ligeia", 1923

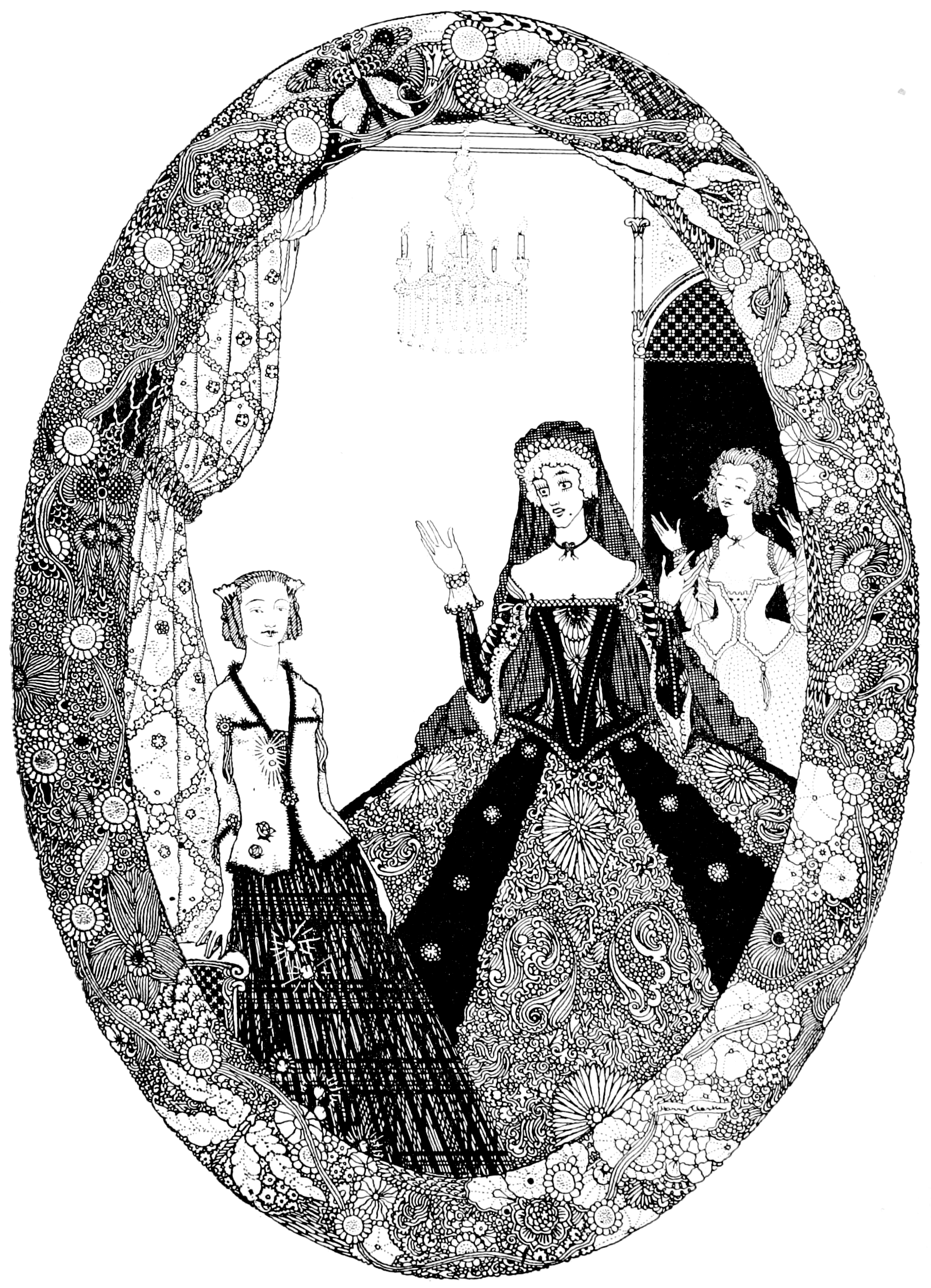
The Fairy, from Fairy tales of Charles Perrault, 1922

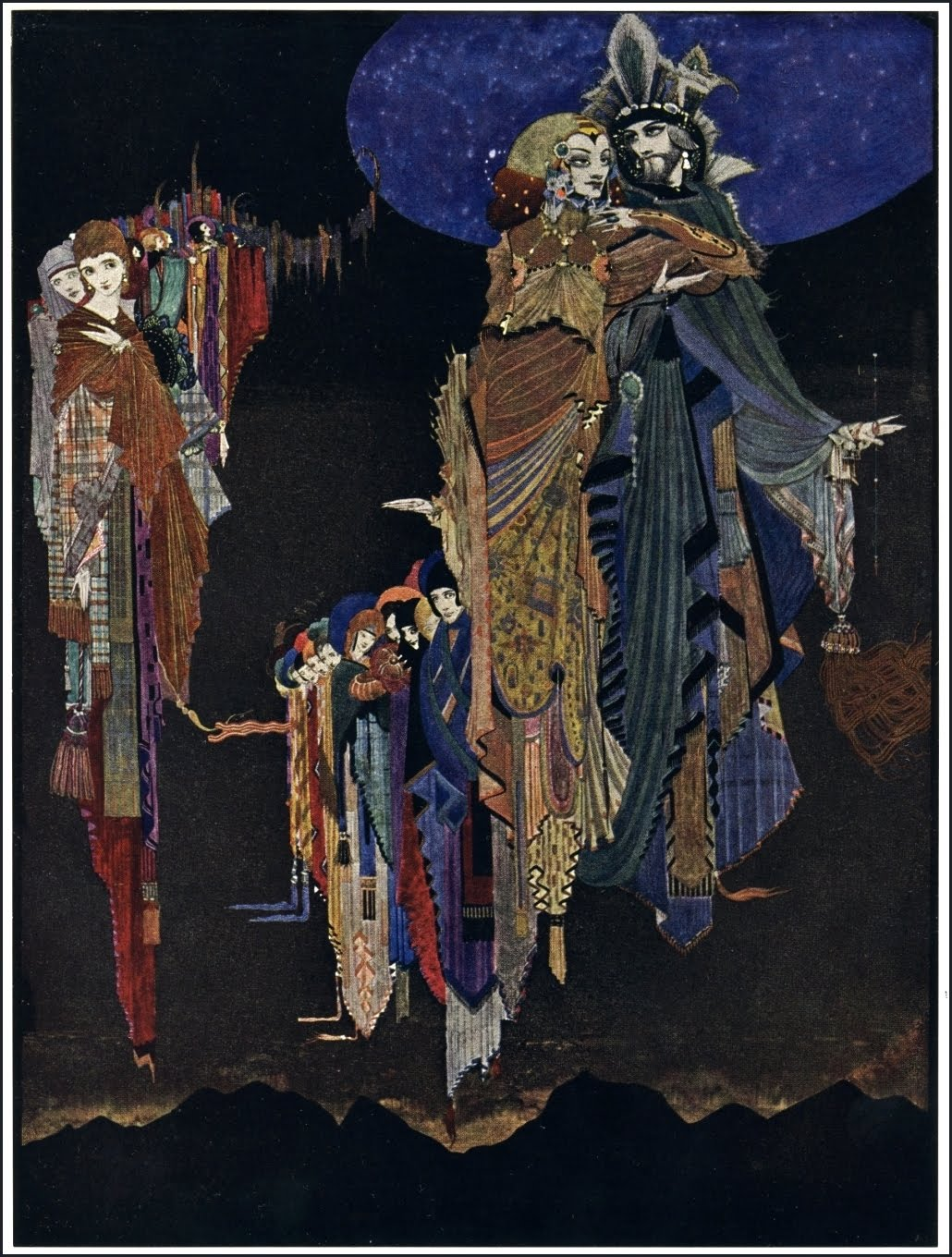
The Colloquy of Monos and Una, Edgar Allan Poe series, 1923

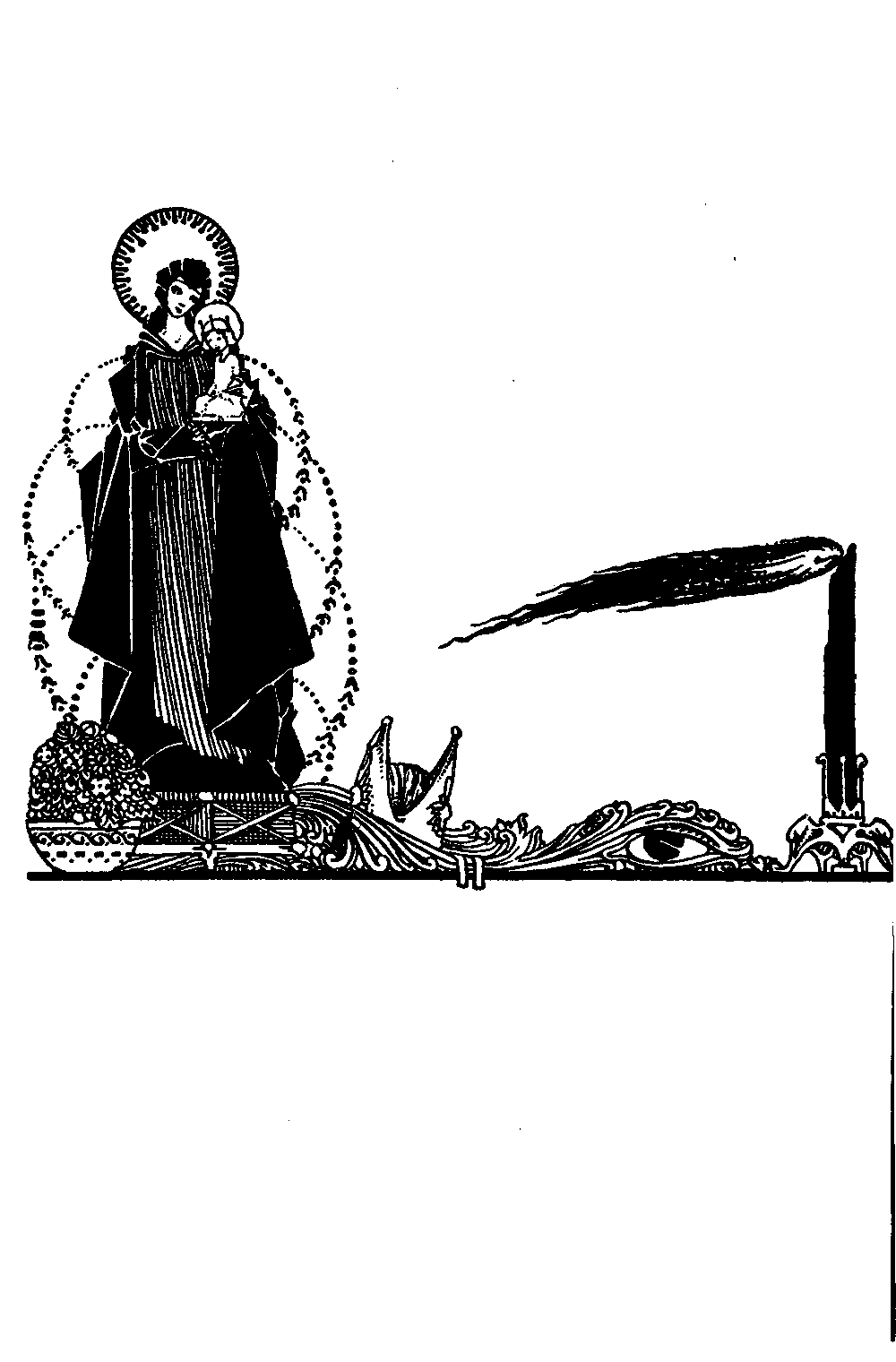
Faust, page 2, 1925

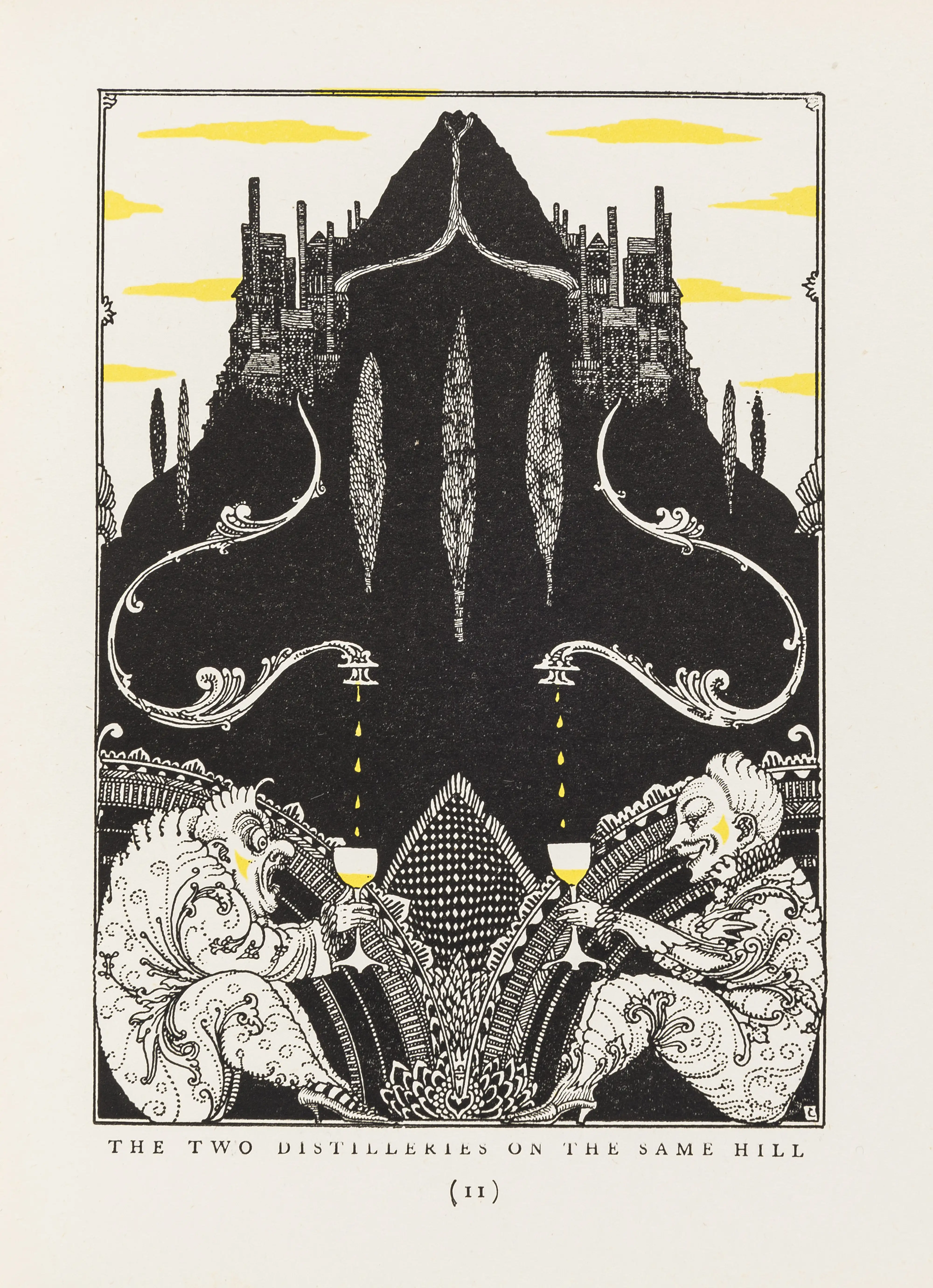
From Elixir of Life, G. C. Warren, 1925

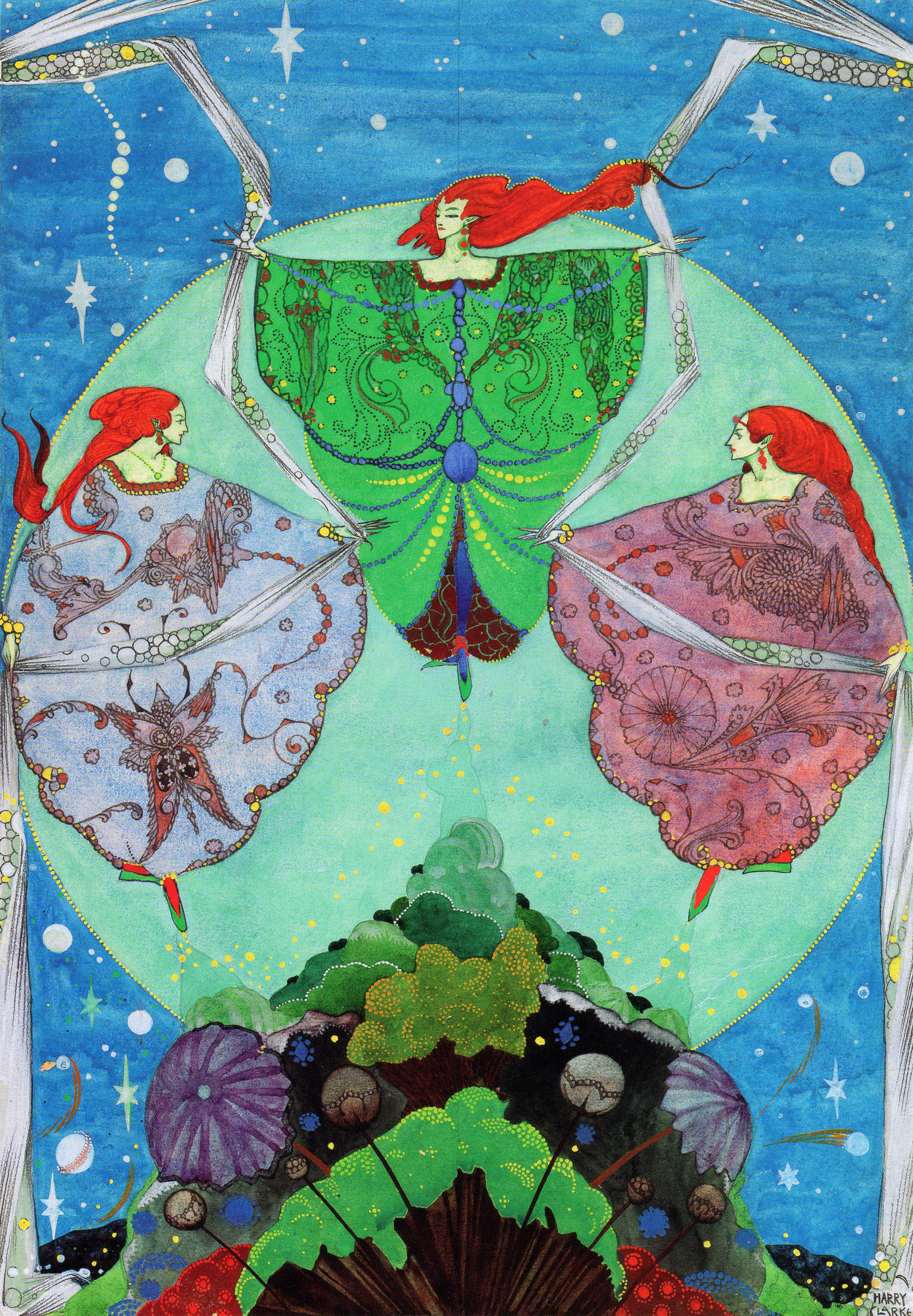
From Fairy Tales of Hans Christian Andersen, 1916

== Works ==
=== As illustrator ===
- Andersen, H. C. — The Fairy Tales of Hans Christian Andersen, George Harrap, London, 1916
- Poe, E. A. — Tales of Mystery and Imagination, George Harrap, London, 1919
- Walters, L. d'O. — The Year's at the Spring, George Harrap, London, 1920 The Year's at the Spring via HathiTrust
- Perrault, C. — The Fairy Tales of Charles Perrault, George Harrap, London, 1922
- ——— Ireland's Memorial Records 1914–1918, Maunsel and Roberts, Dublin, 1923 Volume Five via Trinity College Dublin
- Warren, G. C. — The History of a Great House, John Jameson & Son, Dublin, 1924
- Warren, G. C. — Elixir of Life {Uisge Beatha} John Jameson & Son, Dublin, 1925
- Goethe, J. W. von — Faust, George Harrap, London, 1925
- Swinburne, A. C. — Selected Poems of Charles Swinburne, John Lane, London, 1928

== See also ==
- An Túr Gloine, stained glass firm with which Clarke was associated
- Harry Clarke - Darkness In Light
