= Spanish oak =

Spanish oak may refer to trees or wood of any oak in or from Spain. It is a common name for several trees including:

== European trees ==
- Quercus pyrenaica

== North American trees ==
- Quercus buckleyi
- Quercus falcata
- Quercus palustris
