= Margaret Clarke (artist) =

Irish portrait painter

- Born: Margaret Crilley; 29 July 1881 (Note: Writing in the Irish Arts Review (2007), Hilary Pyle notes that while "Theo Snoddy in his Dictionary of Irish Artists of 1996 quotes the date of birth her family believed to be true as 29 July 1888 [..] there is no mention of this in the public register of births for 1888". Pyle (2007) also states "Art historian Carla Briggs [..] found that she was born in the year 1884 [..] on 1 August of that year, at 17 Thomas Street, Newry". The Dictionary of Irish Biography (2009) gives a date of birth of 29 July 1881.); Newry, County Down, Ireland (present-day Newry, County Down, Northern Ireland)
- Died: 31 October 1961 (aged 77); Dublin, Ireland
- Resting place: Redford Cemetery, Greystones, County Wicklow
- Education: Dublin Metropolitan School of Art
- Known for: Portrait painting
- Spouse: Harry Clarke
- Elected: RHA

Margaret Clarke RHA (née Crilley; 29 July 1881 – 31 October 1961) was an Irish portrait painter.

== Life ==
Margaret Crilley was born in Newry, County Down, Ireland, one of six children of Patrick Crilley. While, according to the Dictionary of Irish Biography, she was born in July 1881, her date of birth is sometimes given as 29 July 1888 or 1 August 1884.

Having initially trained at Newry technical school with her sister Mary intending to become a teacher, in 1905, Margaret won a scholarship to attend the Dublin Metropolitan School of Art. There she studied under William Orpen, who regarded her as one of his most promising students. She completed her studies in 1911 attaining an Art Teacher's Certificate, and began working as Orpen's assistant.

In 1914, Margaret married her fellow student Harry Clarke, much to the surprise of their family and acquaintances. The couple moved into a flat at 33 North Frederick Street. They had three children, Michael, David and Ann. Harry's brother, Walter, married Margaret's sister, Mary, in 1915.

Clarke became the director of the Harry Clarke Stained Glass Studios following the death of her husband in 1931. She died thirty years later in Dublin on 31 October 1961, and is buried in the Redford cemetery, Greystones, County Wicklow. She is commemorated with a blue plaque at her birthplace in Newry.

== Artistic work ==
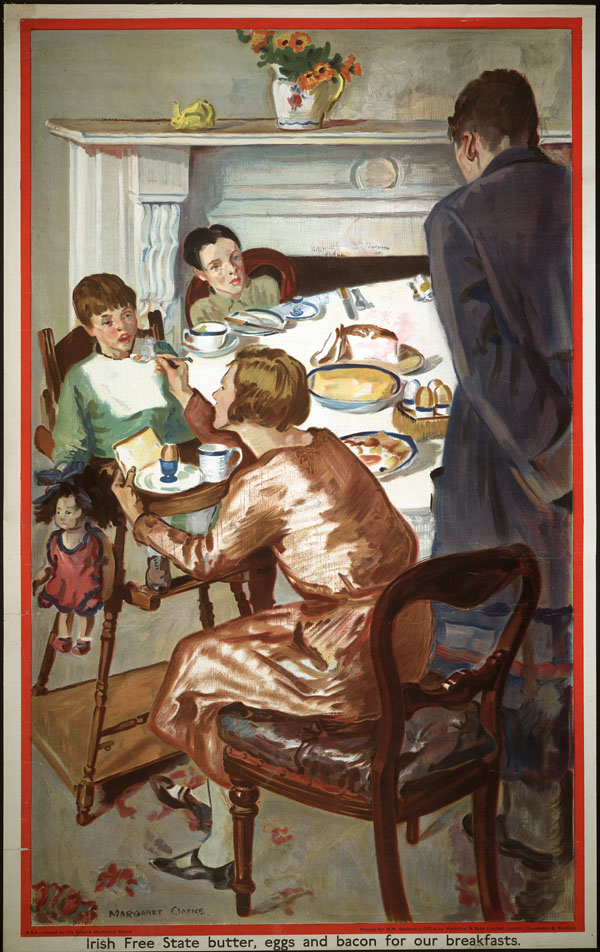
Irish Free State Butter, Eggs and Bacon for our Breakfasts

Clarke first exhibited with the Royal Hibernian Academy in 1913, and would go on to exhibit over 60 artworks in the forty years until 1953, the majority being portraits. Amongst the portrait commissions Clarke received were ones for Dermod O'Brien, President Éamon de Valera, Archbishop McQuaid, and Lennox Robinson. Clarke spent a great deal of time on the Aran Islands with fellow artist Seán Keating and her husband, from which she produced a number of landscapes and smaller studies.

A critic noted in 1939 that Clarke produced "remarkable drawings in which individuality is caught in a few swift economical lines." Over her lifetime Clarke won many awards including the Tailteann gold, silver and bronze medals in 1924, and another Tailteann bronze in both 1928 and 1932. She was elected an Associate of the Royal Hibernian Academy (ARHA) in 1926, and a full RHA in 1927. Upon the founding of the Irish Exhibition of Living Art in 1943, she was appointed a member of the executive committee. Her work can be found in the collections of the National Gallery of Ireland, The Hugh Lane, the Crawford Art Gallery, the Ulster Museum, Limerick City Gallery of Art, the National Self Portrait Collection, and the Irish College in Rome.

== Exhibitions ==
An exhibition at the National Gallery of Ireland in 2017 reevaluated Margaret Clarke's artistic reputation.
