= Fairlie Harmar =

English painter

- Fairlie Harmar, by Bassano Ltd, 4 May 1937, National Portrait Gallery, London
- Born: 1876; Weymouth, England
- Died: 1945 (aged 68–69)
- Known for: Painting
- Spouse: Ernest Pomeroy

Fairlie Harmar, Viscountess Harberton (1876–1945) was an English painter. She was born in Weymouth, Dorset, and studied at the Slade School of Fine Art. Lady Harberton was married to Ernest Pomeroy, 7th Viscount Harberton.

As a Viscountess, she attended the 1937 Coronation, she smuggled in drawing paper to make sketches for a painting that was later in the Royal Collection.

Whilst reviewing Lady Harberton's work in 1918, Ezra Pound thought she was a man, writing "Mr. F. Harmer [sic] has put good work into it".
