= Max Brown (novelist) =

Australian writer

Maxwell MacAlister Brown (21 March 1916 – 19 September 2003) was an Australian novelist and journalist.

== Early career ==
Brown was born in Invercargill, New Zealand, and educated in Melbourne, Australia. He worked as a journalist in Melbourne, Sydney and Perth, as well as in country towns in New South Wales, Australia and Western Australia At one stage, he worked on the Melbourne Argus with fellow journalist and famous Australian novelist-to-be George Johnston, whose tumultuous marriage with writer Charmian Clift would be the subject of Brown's last book. He also worked as a teacher, fitter and turner, wharf labourer and film publicist. He served in the Royal Australian Air Force during the Second World War and used his severance pay to write Australian Son, a highly regarded and sympathetic biography of bushranger Ned Kelly.

== Writing career ==
After publishing Australian Son in 1948, Brown went on to write a number of other books, several dealing with aboriginal themes. His 1966 novel, The Jimberi Track, tells the tale of harassment by white settlers and miners experienced by various aboriginal tribal peoples, including the Wongais in South Australia and Western Australia after World War II. He also published The Black Eureka, an account of the 1946 Pilbara strike by Aboriginal and part-Aboriginal stockmen in the Pilbara, an iconic story in Aboriginal/European race relations which was also retold by Brown's friend, the author Donald Stuart in his award-winning novel Yandy.

== Works ==
- Brown, Max (1948). Australian Son. Georgian House, Melbourne.
- Brown, Max (1958). Wild Turkey. Georgian House, London.
- Brown, Max (1966). The Jimberi Track. The Australasian Book Society.
- Brown, Max (1976). The Black Eureka. The Australasian Book Society.
- Brown, Max (1999). Buttered Toast: Stories and Sketches. Turton & Armstrong, Sydney.
- Brown, Max (2004). Charmian And George: The Marriage of George Johnston And Charmian Clift. Rosenberg Publishing, Sydney.

== Last days ==
Towards the end of his life, Max Brown revised his first work, Australian Son, and the updated edition was published posthumously after careful research into Brown's papers and manuscript by his friend Chester Eagle. He died in Ballarat in September 2003.

== See also ==
- Australian outback literature of the 20th century
