= Ned Kelly =

Australian bushranger (1854–1880)

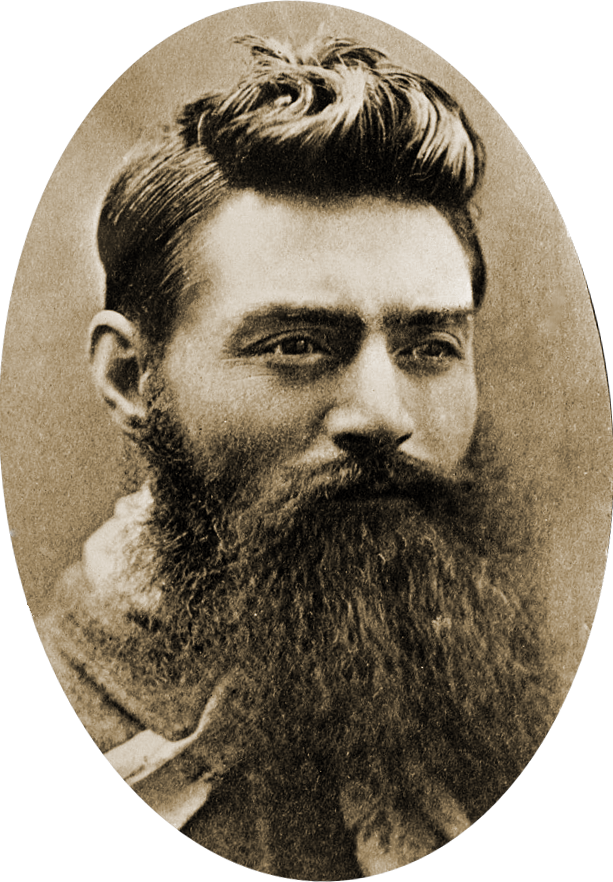
- Kelly on 10 November 1880, the day before his execution
- Born: December 1854 (Note: The date of Kelly's birth is not known, and there is no record of his baptism. Kelly himself thought he was 28 years old when he was hanged. Evidence for a December 1854 birth is from a 1963 interview with family descendants Paddy and Charles Griffiths quoting Ned's brother Jim Kelly who said it was a family tradition that Ned's birth was "at the time of the Eureka Stockade", which took place on 3 December 1854. In July 1870, Ellen Kelly, Ned's mother, recorded Ned's age as 15½, which could easily refer to a December 1854 birth. There is also a remark made by G. Wilson Brown, school inspector, in his notebook on 30 March 1865, where he noted that Ned Kelly was 10 years and 3 months old. Evidence which supports Ned Kelly's birth being in June 1855 is from the death certificate of his father John, who died on 27 December 1866. Ned Kelly's age is written as 11½.); Beveridge, Colony of Victoria, Australia
- Died: 11 November 1880 (aged 25); Melbourne, Colony of Victoria, Australia
- Occupation: Bushranger
- Parents: John "Red" Kelly (1820–1866); Ellen Kelly (née Quinn) (1832–1923)
- Relatives: Dan Kelly (brother); Kate Kelly (sister); Canon Edmond Kelly (cousin)
- Status: Executed by hanging
- Convictions: Murder; assault; theft; armed robbery

Edward Kelly (December 1854 – 11 November 1880) was an Australian bushranger, gang leader and police-murderer. One of the last bushrangers, he is known for wearing a homemade suit of bulletproof armour during his final shootout with the police.

Kelly was born and raised in rural Victoria, the third of eight children to Irish parents. His father, a transported convict, died in 1866, leaving Kelly, then aged 12, as the eldest male of the household. The Kellys were a poor selector family who saw themselves as downtrodden by the squattocracy and as victims of persecution by the Victoria Police.

While a teenager, Kelly was arrested for associating with bushranger Harry Power and served two prison terms for a variety of offences, the longest stretch being from 1871 to 1874. He later joined the "Greta Mob", a group of bush larrikins known for stock theft. A violent confrontation with a policeman occurred at the Kelly family's home in 1878, and Kelly was indicted for his attempted murder. Fleeing to the bush, Kelly vowed to avenge his mother, who was imprisoned for her role in the incident. After he, his brother Dan, and associates Joe Byrne and Steve Hart shot dead three policemen, the government of Victoria proclaimed them outlaws.

Kelly and his gang, with the help of a network of sympathisers, evaded the police for two years. The gang's crime spree included raids on Euroa and Jerilderie, and the killing of Aaron Sherritt, a sympathiser turned police informer. In a manifesto letter, Kelly—denouncing the police, the Victorian government and the British Empire—set down his own account of the events leading up to his outlawry. Demanding justice for his family and the rural poor, he threatened dire consequences for his enemies. In 1880, the gang tried to derail and ambush a police train as a prelude to attacking Benalla, the base of police operations in the region. The police, tipped off, confronted them at Glenrowan, where the gang held dozens of hostages in a hotel. In the ensuing 12-hour siege and gunfight, the outlaws wore armour fashioned from plough mouldboards. Kelly, the only gang member to survive, was severely wounded by police fire and captured. Despite thousands of supporters rallying and petitioning for his reprieve, Kelly was tried for murder, convicted and hanged at the Melbourne Gaol.

Historian Geoffrey Serle called Kelly and his gang "the last expression of the lawless frontier in what was becoming a highly organised and educated society, the last protest of the mighty bush now tethered with iron rails to Melbourne and the world". In the century after his death, Kelly became a cultural icon, inspiring numerous depictions in popular culture, and is the subject of more biographies than any other Australian. Kelly remains a divisive figure in Australia, regarded variously as a Robin Hood-like folk hero and symbol of national identity, or as a murderous villain and terrorist. The journalist Martin Flanagan wrote: "What makes Ned a legend is not that everyone sees him the same—it's that everyone sees him. Like a bushfire on the horizon casting its red glow into the night."

== Family background and early life ==
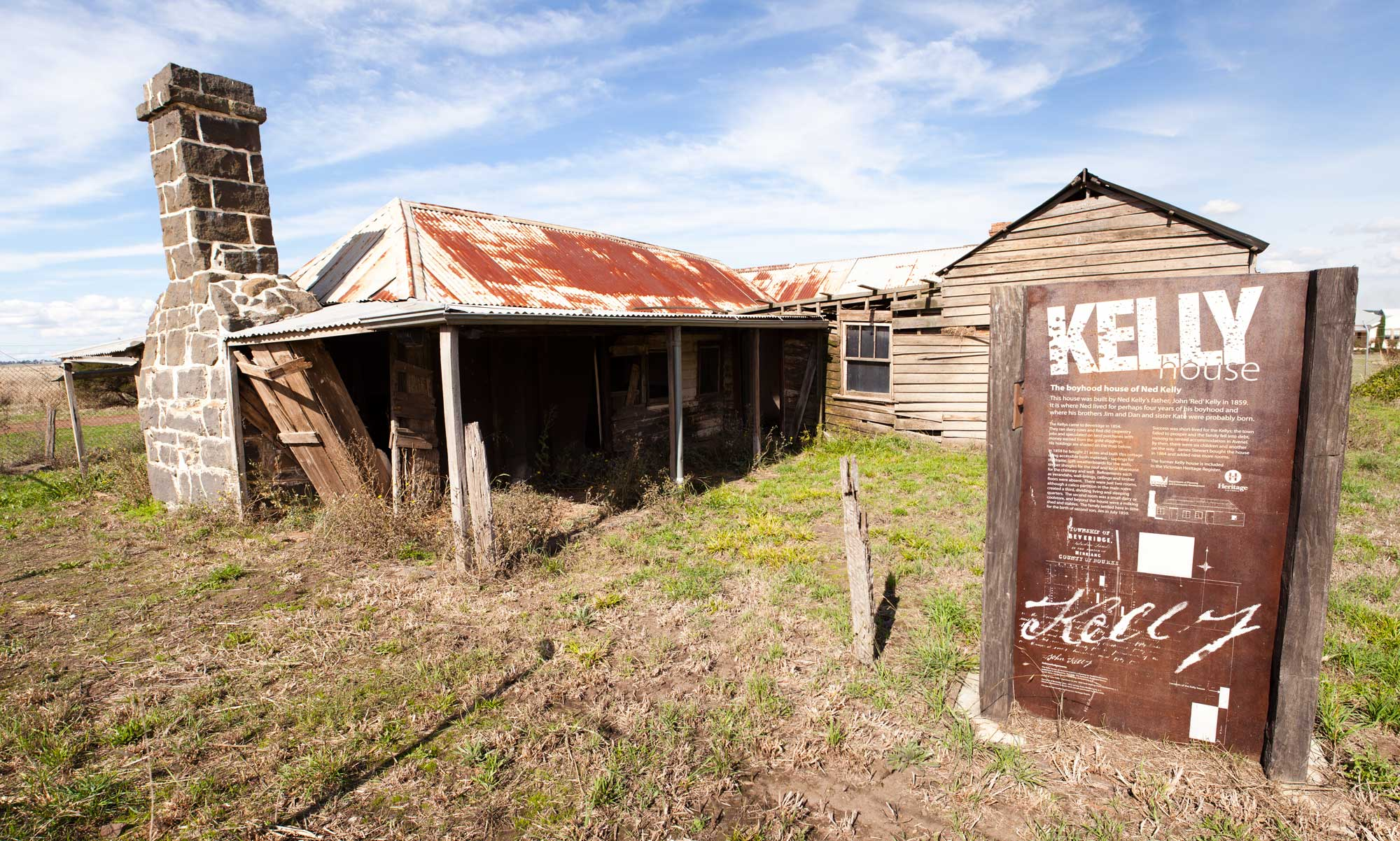
Kelly's boyhood home, built by his father in Beveridge in 1859

Kelly's father, John Kelly (nicknamed "Red"), was born in 1820 at Clonbrogan near Moyglass, County Tipperary, Ireland. Aged 21, he was found guilty of stealing two pigs and sentenced to seven years' transportation to Van Diemen's Land (modern-day Tasmania), arriving in Hobart Town aboard the convict ship Prince Regent in January 1842. Granted his certificate of freedom a year early, Red moved to the Port Phillip District (modern-day Victoria) in 1848 and was employed as a bush carpenter by farmer James Quinn at Wallan Wallan.

On 18 November 1850, at St Francis Church, Melbourne, Red married Ellen Quinn, his employer's 18-year-old daughter, who was born in County Antrim, Ireland, and migrated as a child with her parents to the Port Phillip District. In the wake of the 1851 Victorian gold rush, the couple turned to mining and earned enough money to buy a small freehold in Beveridge, north of Melbourne.

Edward ("Ned") Kelly was their third child. His exact birth date is unknown, but was probably in December 1854. Kelly was possibly baptised by Augustinian priest Charles O'Hea, who also administered his last rites before his execution. His parents had seven other children: Mary Jane (born 1851, died 6 months later), Annie (1853–1872), Margaret (1857–1896), James ("Jim", 1859–1946), Daniel ("Dan", 1861–1880), Catherine ("Kate", 1863–1898) and Grace (1865–1940).

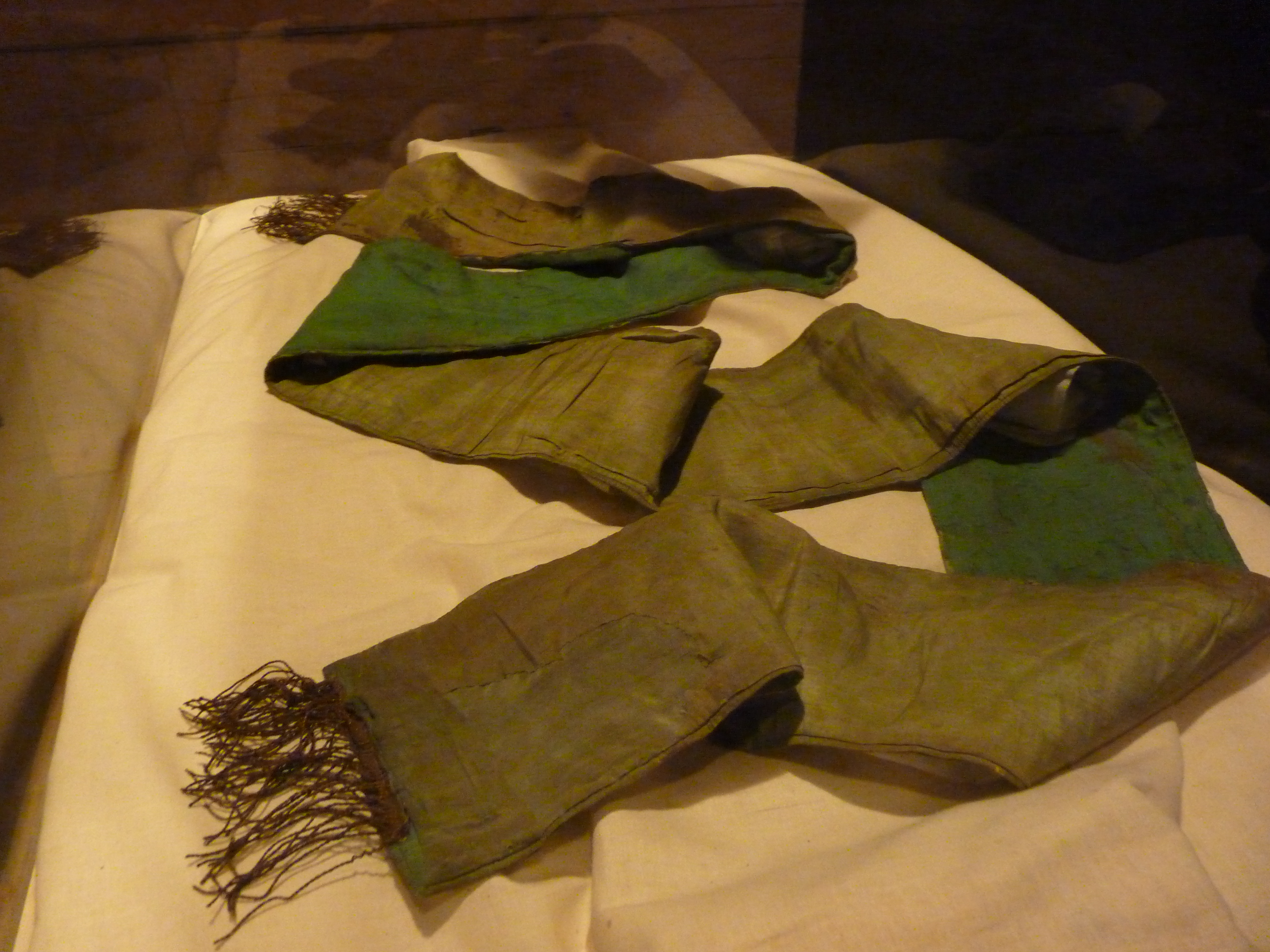
According to oral tradition, a young Kelly was awarded this green sash after saving another boy from drowning in a creek. Kelly wore it under his armour during his last stand at Glenrowan. It remains stained with his blood. (Benalla Museum)

The Kellys struggled on inferior farmland at Beveridge and Red began drinking heavily. In 1864 the family moved to Avenel, near Seymour, where Kelly obtained basic schooling and became familiar with the bush. According to oral tradition, he risked his life at Avenel by saving another boy from drowning in a creek, for which the boy's family gifted him a green sash. It is said this was the same sash worn by Kelly during his last stand in 1880.

In 1865, Red was convicted of receiving a stolen hide and, unable to pay the £25 fine, sentenced to six months' hard labour. In December 1866, Red was fined for being drunk and disorderly. Badly affected by alcoholism, he died later that month at Avenel, two days after Christmas. Ned signed his death certificate.

The following year, the Kellys moved to Greta in north-eastern Victoria, near the Quinns and their relatives by marriage, the Lloyds. Several members were implicated in livestock theft, drawing police attention to the clan. In 1868, Kelly's uncle Jim Kelly was convicted of arson after setting fire to the rented premises where the Kellys and some of the Lloyds were staying. Jim was sentenced to death, but this was later commuted to fifteen years of hard labour. The Kellys soon leased a small farm of 88 acres (360,000 m^{2}) at Eleven Mile Creek near Greta. The selection proved ill-suited for farming, and Ellen supplemented her income by offering accommodation to travellers and selling sly-grog.

== Rise to notoriety ==
=== Bushranging with Harry Power ===
I'm a bushranger.

— The earliest known words attributed to Kelly in public record, as reported by Chinese hawker Ah Fook, 1869.

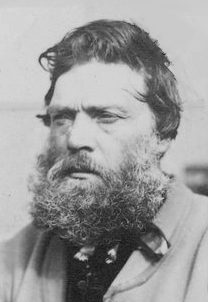
Harry Power has been described as Kelly's bushranging "mentor".

In 1869, 14-year-old Kelly met Irish-born Harry Power (alias of Henry Johnson), a transported convict who turned to bushranging in north-eastern Victoria after escaping Melbourne's Pentridge Prison. The Kellys were Power sympathisers, and by May 1869 Ned had become his bushranging protégé. That month, they attempted to steal horses from the Mansfield property of squatter John Rowe as part of a plan to rob the Woods Point–Mansfield gold escort. They abandoned the idea after Rowe shot at them, and Kelly temporarily broke off his association with Power.

Kelly's first brush with the law occurred in October 1869. A Chinese hawker named Ah Fook said that as he passed the Kelly family home, Ned brandished a long stick, declared himself a bushranger and robbed him of 10 shillings. Kelly, arrested and charged with highway robbery, claimed in court that Fook had abused him and his sister Annie in a dispute over the hawker's request for a drink of water. Family witnesses backed Ned and the charge was dismissed.

Kelly and Power reconciled in March 1870 and, over the next month, committed a series of armed robberies. By the end of April, the press had named Kelly as Power's young accomplice, and a few days later he was captured by police and confined to HM Prison Beechworth. Kelly fronted court on three robbery charges, with the victims in each case failing to identify him. On the third charge, Superintendents Nicolas and Hare insisted Kelly be tried, citing his resemblance to the suspect. After a month in custody, Kelly was released due to insufficient evidence. The Kellys allegedly intimidated witnesses into withholding testimony. Another factor in the lack of identification may have been that Power's accomplice was described as a "half-caste", but the police believed this to be the result of Kelly going unwashed.

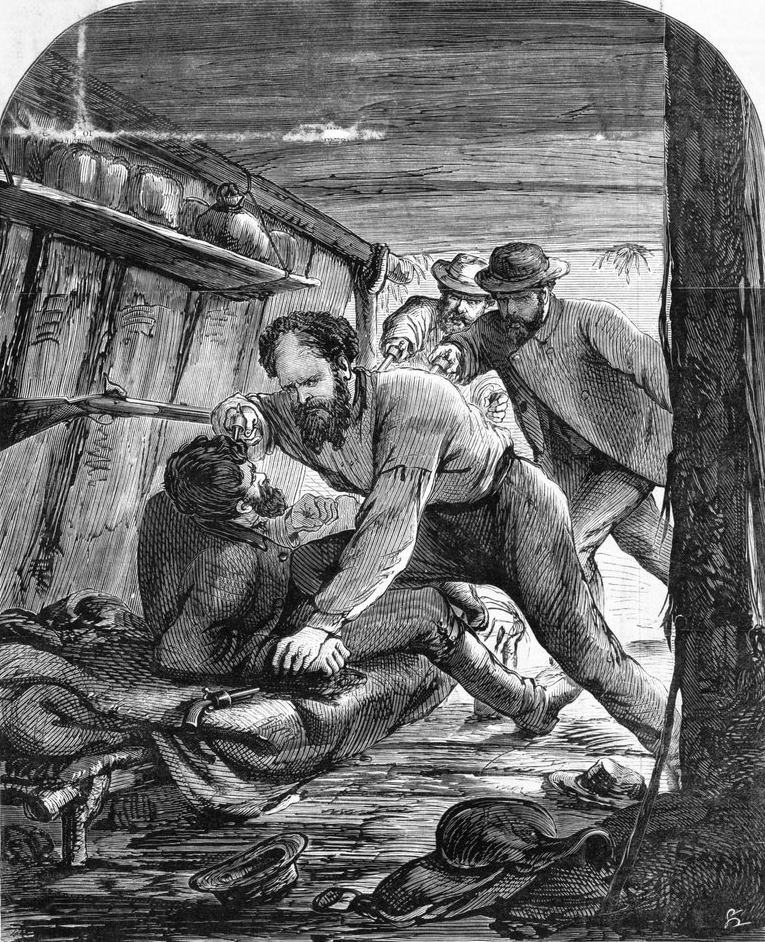
Power's capture. Kelly was accused of informing on the bushranger.

Power often camped at Glenmore Station on the King River, owned by Kelly's maternal grandfather, James Quinn. In June 1870, while resting in a mountainside gunyah (bark shelter) that overlooked the property, Power was captured and arrested by police. Word soon spread that Kelly had informed on him. Kelly denied the rumour, and in the only surviving letter known to bear his handwriting, he pleads with Sergeant James Babington of Kyneton for help, saying that "everyone looks on me like a black snake". The informant turned out to be Kelly's uncle, Jack Lloyd, who received £500 for his assistance. However, Kelly had also given information which led to Power's capture, possibly in exchange for having the charges against him dropped. Power always maintained that Kelly betrayed him.

Reporting on Power's criminal career, the Benalla Ensign wrote:

The effect of his example has already been to draw one young fellow into the open vortex of crime, and unless his career is speedily cut short, young Kelly will blossom into a declared enemy of society.

=== Horse theft, assault and imprisonment ===
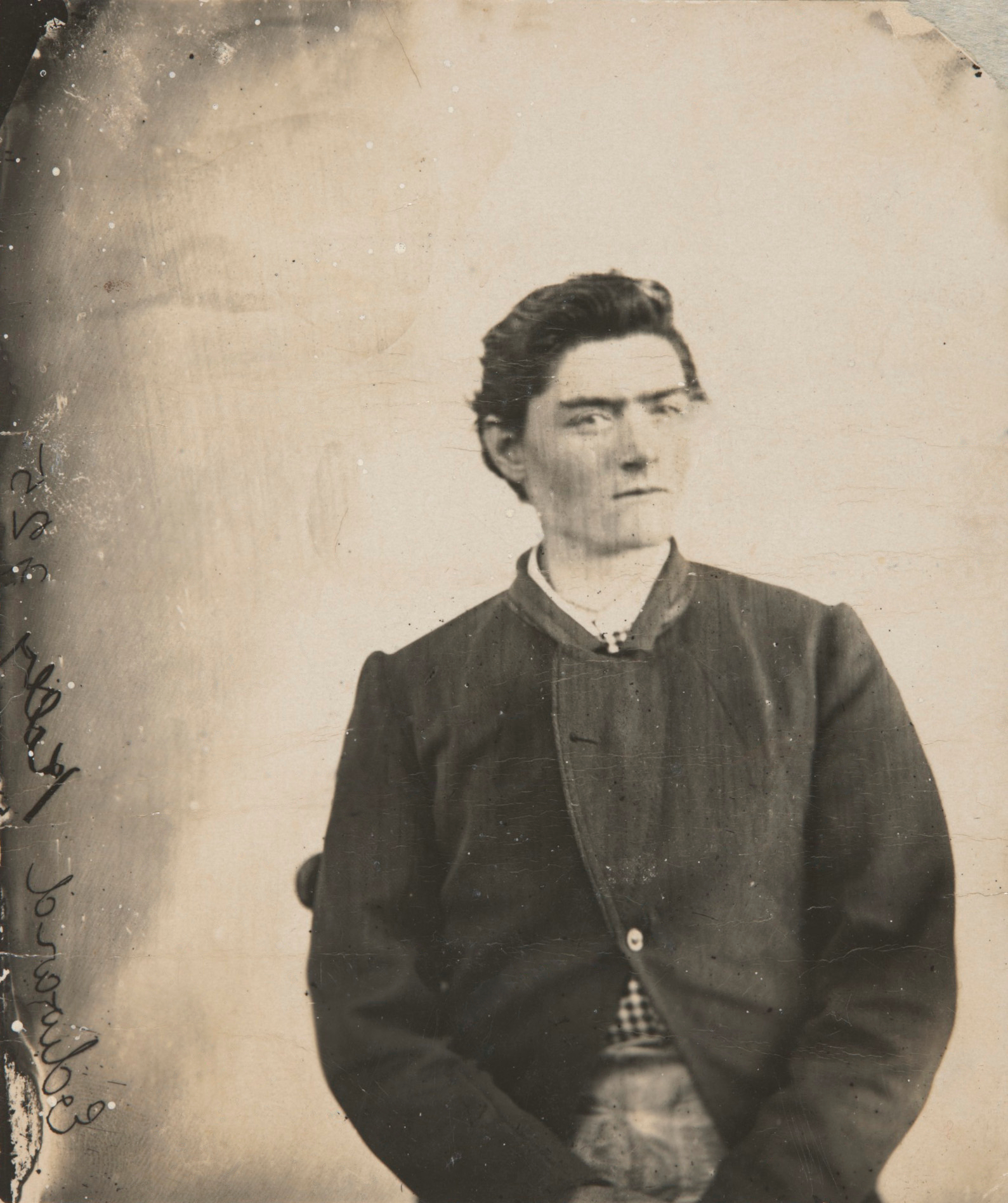
Mugshot of Kelly, aged 15

In October 1870, a hawker, Jeremiah McCormack, accused a friend of the Kellys, Ben Gould, of stealing his horse. In response, Gould sent an indecent note and a parcel of calves' testicles to McCormack's wife, which Kelly helped deliver. When McCormack later confronted Kelly over his role, Kelly punched him and was arrested for both the note and the assault, receiving three months' hard labour for each charge.

Kelly was released from Beechworth Gaol in March 1871, five weeks early, and returned to Greta. Shortly after, he found a horse reported missing by horse-breaker Isaiah "Wild" Wright and took it to Wangaratta. When Kelly rode back into Greta four days later, Constable Edward Hall tried to arrest him on suspicion the horse was stolen. Kelly resisted and overpowered Hall, who, with bystanders' help, eventually arrested and pistol-whipped him, leaving his head "a mass of raw and bleeding flesh". Initially charged with horse stealing, the charge was downgraded to "feloniously receiving a horse", as Wright had borrowed it without the owner's permission. Kelly and Wright received prison sentences of three years and eighteen months respectively.

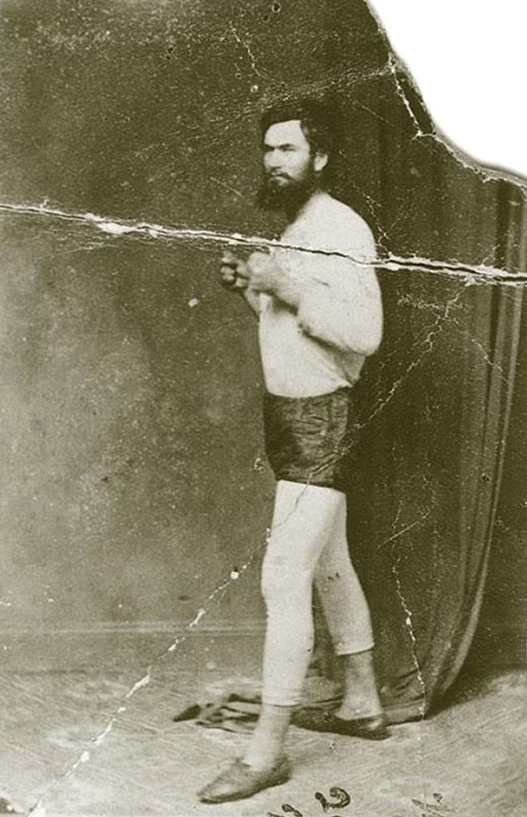
Kelly in boxing attire, 1874

Kelly served his sentence at Beechworth Gaol and Pentridge Prison, then aboard the prison hulk Sacramento, off Williamstown. He was freed six months early for good behaviour, and returned to Greta. According to one possibly apocryphal story, Kelly, to settle the score with Wright over the horse, fought and beat him in a bare-knuckle boxing match. A photograph of Kelly in a boxing pose is commonly linked to the match. Regardless of the story's veracity, Wright became a known Kelly sympathiser.

Over the next few years, Kelly worked at sawmills and spent periods in New South Wales (NSW) leading what he called the life of a "rambling gambler". During this time, his mother married an American, George King. In early 1877, Ned joined King in an organised horse theft operation. Ned later claimed that the group stole 280 horses. Its membership overlapped with that of the Greta Mob, a bush larrikin gang known for their distinctive "flash" attire. Apart from Ned, the gang included his brother Dan, cousins Jack and Tom Lloyd, and Joe Byrne, Steve Hart and Aaron Sherritt.

On 18 September 1877, Kelly was arrested in Benalla for riding over a footpath while drunk. The following day he brawled with four constables who were escorting him to court, including a friend of the Kellys, Alexander Fitzpatrick. Another constable involved, Thomas Lonigan, allegedly grabbed Kelly's testicles during the altercation; legend has it that Kelly vowed, "Well, Lonigan, I never shot a man yet; but if I ever do, so help me God, you will be the first!" Kelly was fined and released.

In August 1877, Kelly and King sold six horses they had stolen from pastoralist James Whitty to William Baumgarten, a horse dealer in Barnawartha. On 10 November, Baumgarten was arrested for selling the horses. Warrants for Ned and Dan's arrest for the theft were sworn in March and April 1878. King disappeared around this time.

== Fitzpatrick incident ==
=== Fitzpatrick's version of events ===
Constable Fitzpatrick

On 11 April 1878, Constable Strachan of Greta heard that Ned was at a shearing shed in NSW and left to apprehend him. Four days later, Constable Fitzpatrick arrived at Greta for relief duty and called at the Kellys' home to arrest Dan for horse theft. Finding Dan absent, Fitzpatrick stayed and conversed with Ellen Kelly. When Dan and his brother-in-law Bill Skillion arrived later that evening, Fitzpatrick informed Dan that he was under arrest. Dan asked to be allowed to have dinner first. The constable consented and stood guard over his prisoner.

Minutes later, Ned rushed in and shot at Fitzpatrick with a revolver, missing him. Ellen then hit Fitzpatrick over the head with a fire shovel. A struggle ensued and Ned fired again, wounding Fitzpatrick above his left wrist. Skillion and Williamson came in, brandishing revolvers, and Dan disarmed Fitzpatrick.

Ned apologised to Fitzpatrick, saying that he mistook him for another constable. Fitzpatrick fainted and when he regained consciousness Ned compelled him to extract the bullet from his own arm with a knife; Ellen dressed the wound. Ned devised a cover story and promised to reward Fitzpatrick if he adhered to it. Fitzpatrick was allowed to leave. About 1.5 km away he noticed two horsemen in pursuit, so he spurred his horse into a gallop to escape. He reached a hotel where his wound was re-bandaged, then rode to Benalla to report the incident.

=== Kelly family version of events ===
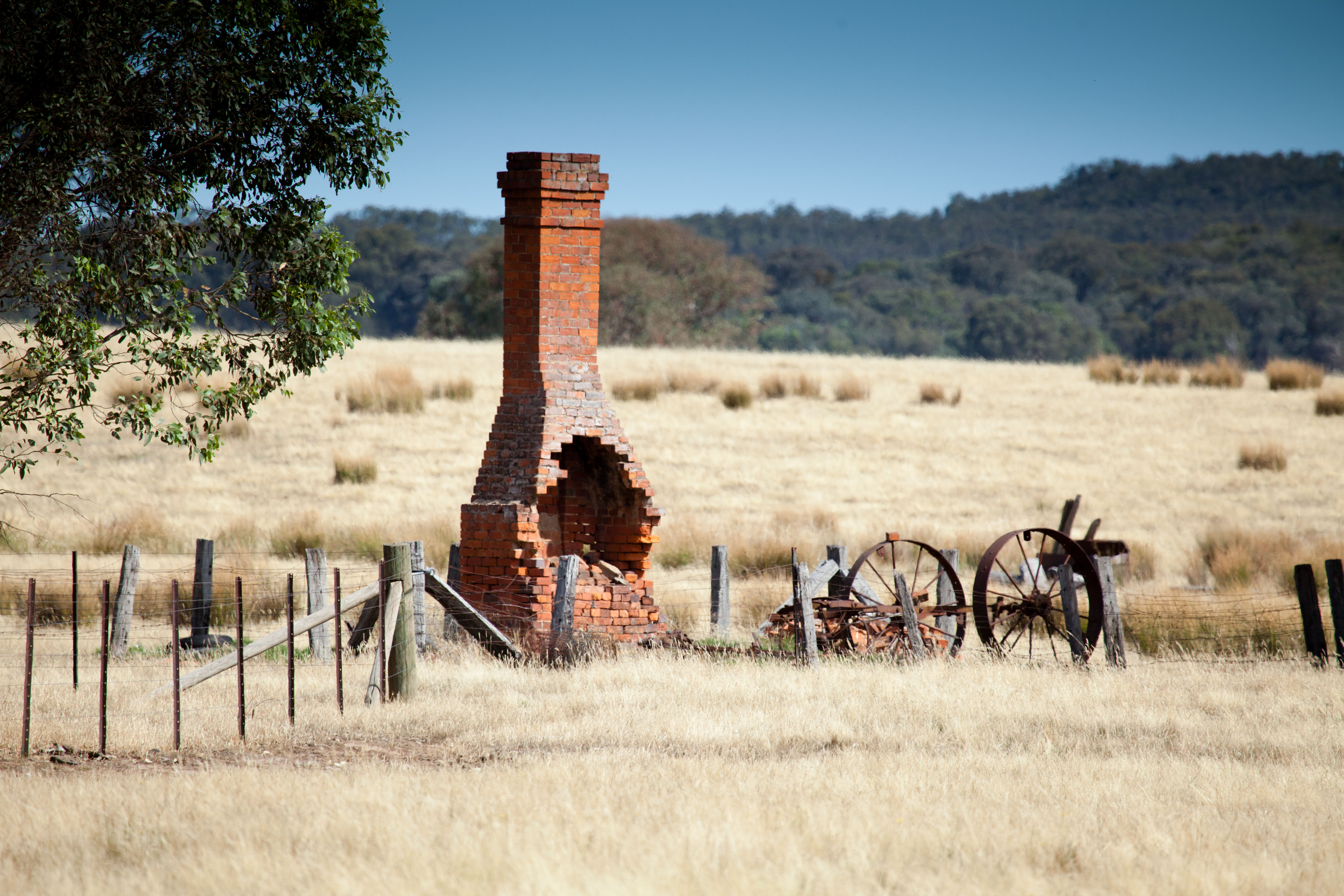
Remains of the Kelly residence at Greta, site of the Fitzpatrick incident

Kelly and members of his family gave conflicting accounts of the Fitzpatrick incident. Kelly initially claimed he was away from Greta at the time, and that if Fitzpatrick suffered any wounds, they were probably self-inflicted. In 1879, Kelly's sister Kate stated that he shot Fitzpatrick after the constable had made a sexual advance to her. After Kelly was captured in 1880, he called it "a foolish story", and three policemen gave sworn evidence that he admitted he had shot Fitzpatrick.

In 1881, Brickey Williamson, who was seeking remission for his sentence in relation to the incident, stated that Kelly shot Fitzpatrick after the constable had drawn his revolver. Many years later, Kelly's brother Jim and cousin Tom Lloyd claimed that Fitzpatrick was drunk when he arrived at the house, and while seated, pulled Kate onto his knee, provoking Dan to throw him to the floor. In the ensuing struggle, Fitzpatrick drew his revolver, Ned appeared, and with Dan seized and disarmed the constable, who later claimed a wrist injury from a door lock was a gunshot wound.

Kelly scholars Jones and Dawson conclude that Kelly shot Fitzpatrick but it was his friend Joe Byrne who was with him, not Skillion.

=== Trial ===
While Ned and Dan evaded capture, Williamson, Skillion and Ellen were arrested and charged with aiding and abetting attempted murder. They appeared before Judge Redmond Barry on 9 October. Fitzpatrick's doctor testified that the constable "was certainly not drunk" and that his wounds were consistent with his statement. The defence called two witnesses in an effort to demonstrate that Skillion had not been present, thereby casting doubt on Fitzpatrick's testimony; however, one witness placed Ned in Greta that afternoon, which proved damaging to the defence. Ellen, Skillion and Williamson were convicted as accessories to attempted murder, with Skillion and Williamson each sentenced to six years' imprisonment and Ellen to three years' hard labour at Melbourne Gaol.

== Stringybark Creek police murders ==
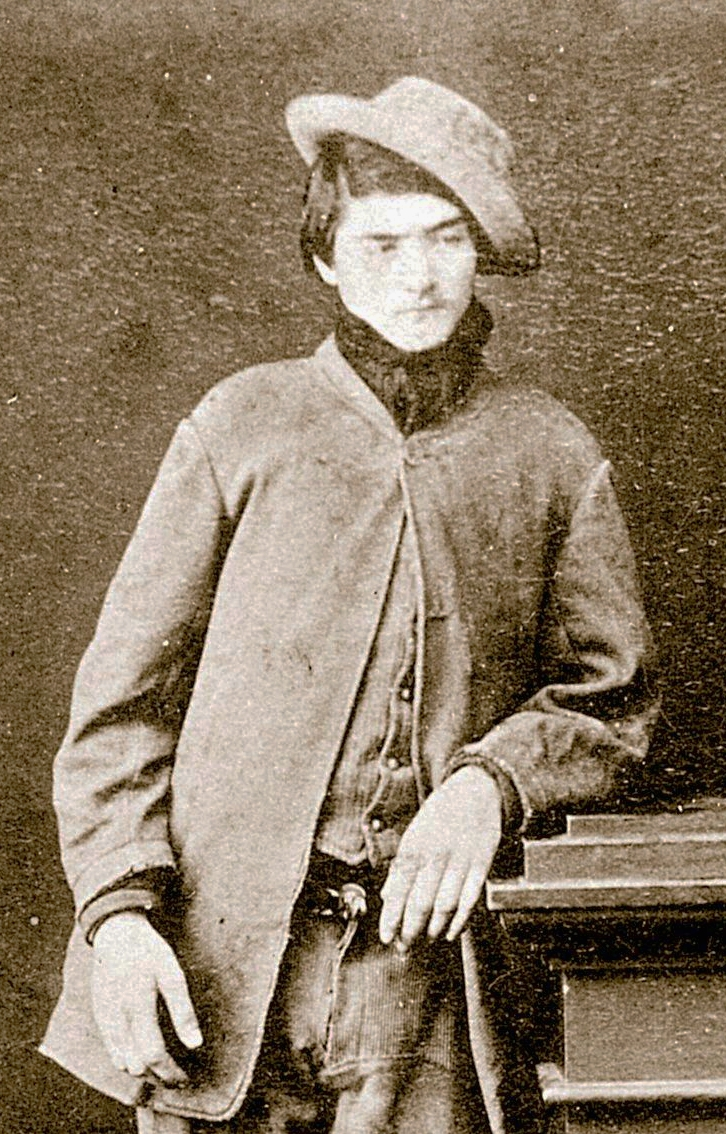
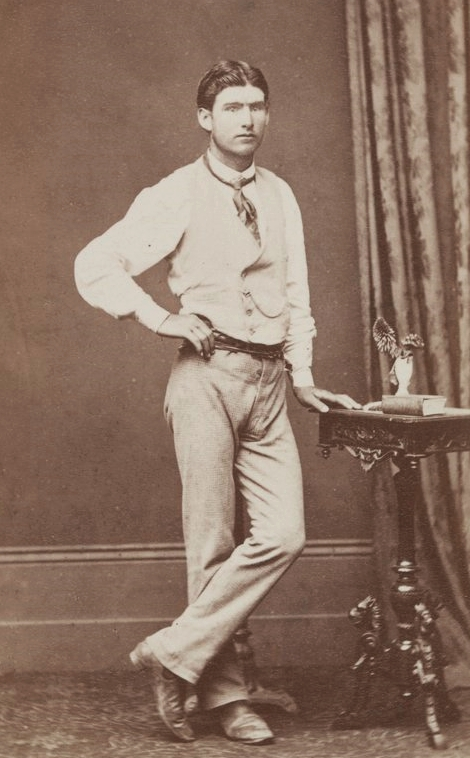
Greta Mob members Dan Kelly (left), Steve Hart (centre) and Joe Byrne (right) took to bushranging with Ned Kelly after the Fitzpatrick incident.

After the Fitzpatrick incident, Ned and Dan escaped into the bush and were joined by Greta Mob members Joe Byrne and Steve Hart. Hiding out for six months at Bullock Creek in the Wombat Ranges, they earned money sluicing gold and distilling whisky, and were supplied with provisions and information by sympathisers.

The police were tipped off about the gang's whereabouts and, on 25 October 1878, two mounted police parties were sent to capture them. One party, consisting of Sergeant Michael Kennedy and constables Michael Scanlan, Thomas Lonigan and Thomas McIntyre camped overnight at an abandoned mining site at Stringybark Creek, Toombullup, 36 km north of Mansfield. Unbeknownst to them, the gang's hideout was only 2.5 km away and Ned had traced the policemen's tracks and observed their camp from afar. He later said the gang "came to the conclusion our doom was sealed unless we could take their firearms".

Clockwise from top left: Constable Lonigan, Sergeant Kennedy, Constable McIntyre and Constable Scanlan

The following day at about 5 pm, while Kennedy and Scanlan were out scouting, the gang bailed up McIntyre and Lonigan at the camp. McIntyre was then unarmed and surrendered. Lonigan made a motion to draw his revolver and ran for the cover of a log. Ned immediately shot Lonigan, killing him. Ned said he did not begrudge his death, calling him the "meanest man that I had any account against".

The gang questioned McIntyre and took his and Lonigan's firearms. Hoping to convince Ned to spare Kennedy and Scanlan, McIntyre informed him that they too were Irish Catholics. In reply, Ned emphasised his Australian birth, saying, "I will let them see what one native can do." At about 5.30 pm, the gang heard them approaching and hid. Ned advised McIntyre to tell them to surrender. As the constable did so, the gang ordered them to bail up. Kennedy reached for his revolver, whereupon the gang fired. Scanlan dismounted and, according to McIntyre, was shot while trying to unsling his rifle. Ned maintained that Scanlan fired and was trying to fire again when he fatally shot him.

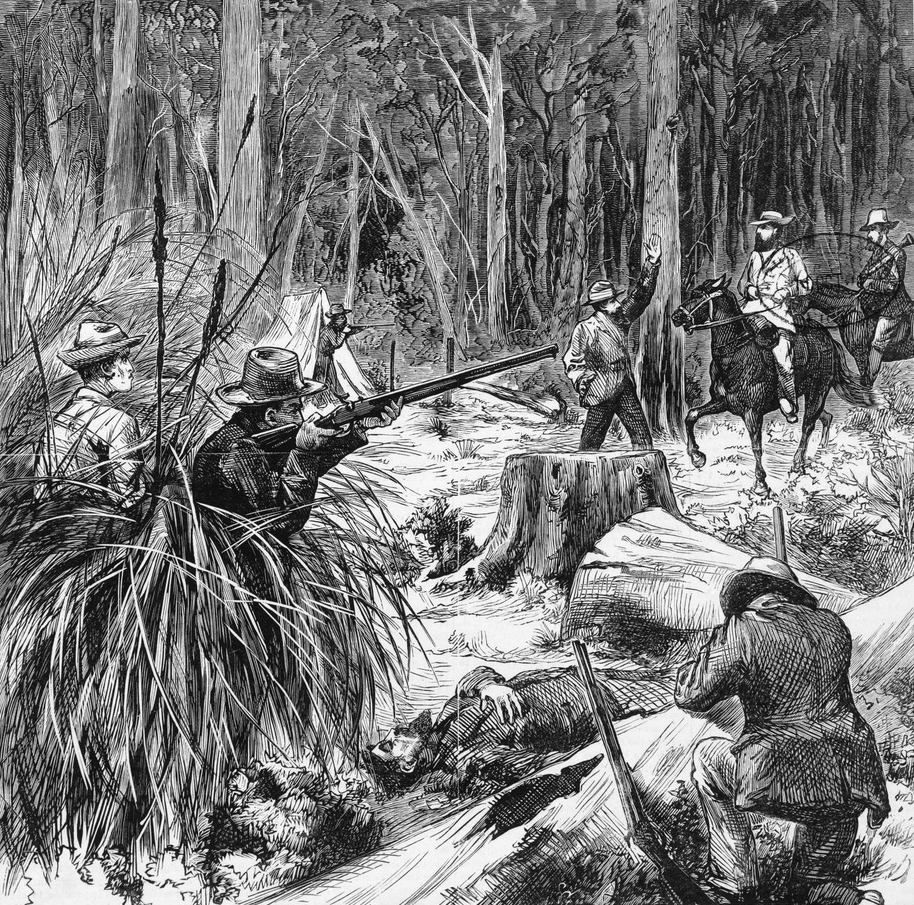
The gang prepares to open fire as Kennedy and Scanlan arrive. Lonigan's body lies in the foreground.

According to McIntyre, the gang continued firing at Kennedy as he dismounted and tried to surrender. Ned later stated that Kennedy hid behind a tree and fired back, then fled into the bush. Ned and Dan pursued and exchanged gunfire with the sergeant for over 1 km before Ned shot him in the right side. According to Ned, Kennedy then turned to face him and Ned shot him in the chest with his shotgun, not realising that Kennedy had dropped his revolver and was trying to surrender.

Amidst the shootout, McIntyre, still unarmed, escaped on Kennedy's horse. He reached Mansfield the following day and a search party was quickly dispatched and found the bodies of Lonigan and Scanlan. Kennedy's body was found two days later.

In his accounts of the shootout, Ned justified the killings as acts of self-defence, citing reports of policemen boasting that they would shoot him on sight, the cache of weapons and ammunition that the police carried, and their failure to surrender as evidence of their intention to kill him. McIntyre stated that the police party's intention was to arrest him, that they were not excessively armed, and that it was the gang who were the aggressors. Jones, Morrissey and others have questioned aspects of both versions of events.

=== Outlawed under the Felons Apprehension Act ===
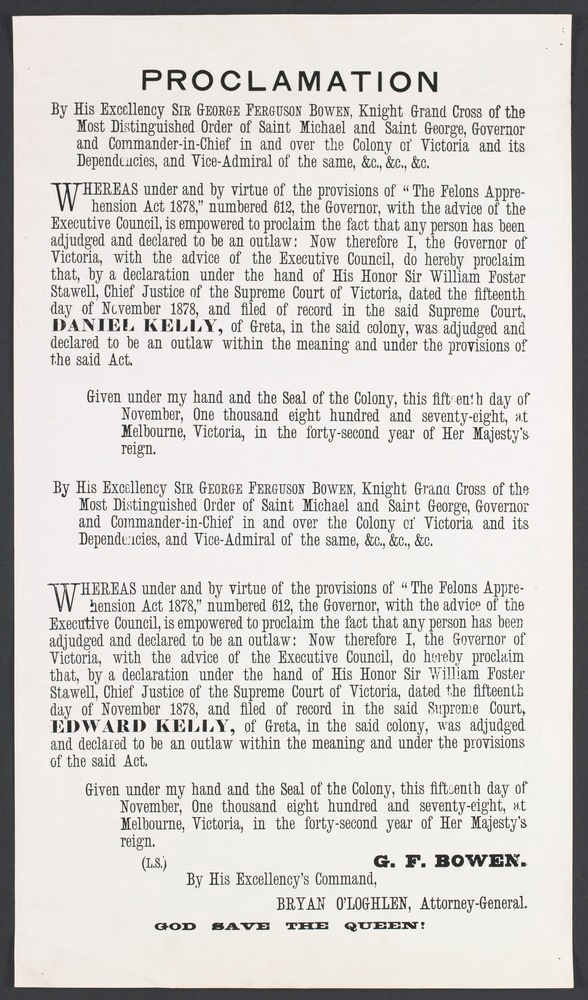
Proclamation by Governor George Bowen declaring Ned and Dan outlaws

On 28 October, the Victorian government announced a reward of £800 for the arrest of the gang; it was soon increased to £2,000. Three days later, the Parliament of Victoria passed the Felons Apprehension Act, which came into effect on 1 November. The bushrangers were given until 12 November to surrender. On 15 November, having remained at large, they were officially outlawed. As a result, anyone who encountered them armed, or had a reasonable suspicion that they were armed, could kill them without consequence. The act also penalised anyone who gave "any aid, shelter or sustenance" to the outlaws or withheld information, or gave false information, to the authorities. Punishment was imprisonment with or without hard labour for up to 15 years.

The Victorian act was based on the 1865 Felons Apprehension Act, passed by the Parliament of New South Wales to rein in bushrangers such as the Gardiner–Hall gang and Dan Morgan. In response to the Kelly gang, the NSW parliament re-enacted their legislation as the Felons Apprehension Act 1879.

== Euroa raid ==
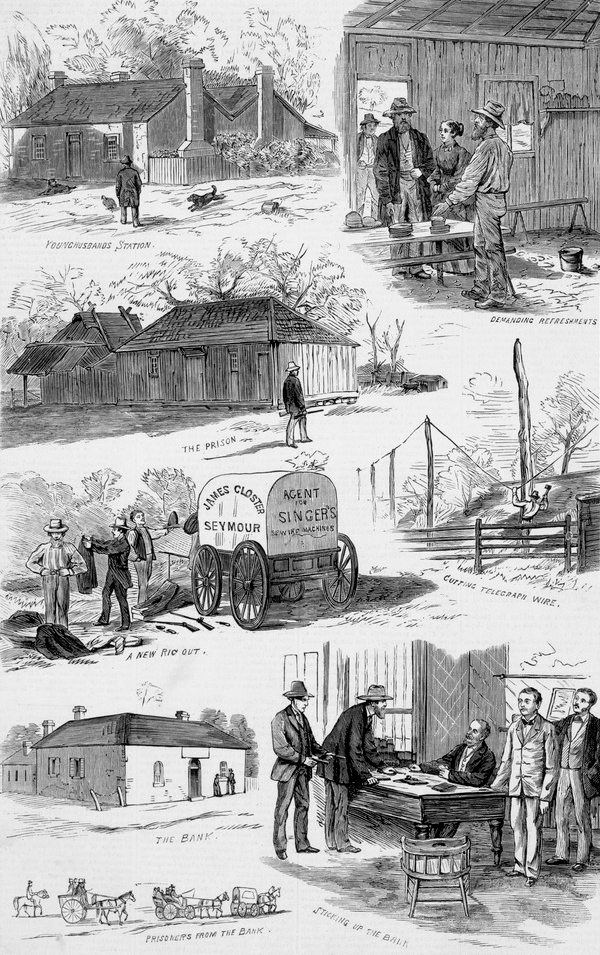
Scenes from the Euroa raid

After the police killings, the gang tried to escape into NSW but, due to flooding of the Murray River, returned to north-eastern Victoria. They narrowly avoided the police on several occasions and relied on an extensive network of sympathisers for support.

In need of funds, the gang decided to rob the bank of Euroa. Byrne reconnoitered the small town on 8 December 1878. Around midday the next day, the gang held up Younghusband Station, outside Euroa. Fourteen male employees and passers-by were held hostage overnight in an outbuilding on the station; female hostages were held in the homestead. Some hostages were likely sympathisers with prior knowledge of the raid.

The following day, Dan guarded the hostages while Ned, Byrne and Hart cut Euroa's telegraph wires. They encountered and held up a hunting party and some railway workers, whom they took back to the station. With Byrne guarding the hostages, Ned, Dan and Hart held up the Euroa branch of the National Bank of Australasia, netting cash and gold worth £2,260 and some documents and securities. Fourteen staff were taken back to Younghusband Station as hostages. Before leaving that evening, the gang performed trick riding for their thirty-seven captives and warned them to stay put for three hours or suffer reprisals.

Newspapers noted the efficiency of the raid and compared it with the inefficiency of the police. Several hostages described the gang as courteous and non-violent. However, they also reported that the bushrangers occasionally threatened to shoot hostages or burn buildings in the event of resistance.

=== Cameron Letter ===
At Younghusband Station, Byrne wrote two copies of a letter that Kelly had dictated. They were posted on 14 December to Donald Cameron, a Victorian parliamentarian who Kelly mistook as sympathetic to the gang, and Superintendent John Sadleir. In the letter, Kelly gives his version of the Fitzpatrick incident and the Stringybark Creek killings, details alleged police corruption and harassment of his family, and warns that if the Victorian government fails to grant justice, including the release of his imprisoned mother, he will seek revenge on those responsible and that "horrible disasters will follow", signing off as "Edward Kelly, enforced outlaw". He expected Cameron to read it out in parliament, but the government only allowed summaries to be made public. Kelly expanded on much of its content in the 1879 Jerilderie Letter.

== Kelly sympathisers detained ==
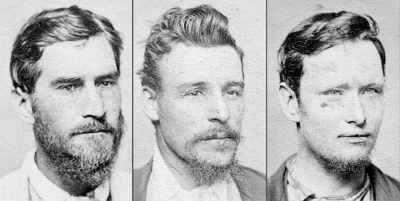
The imprisonment of Kelly sympathisers without trial turned public opinion against the police. Among those imprisoned were John Quinn (left), John Stewart (centre), and Joseph Ryan (right).

On 2 January 1879, police obtained warrants for the arrest of 30 presumed Kelly sympathisers, 23 of whom were remanded in custody. Over a third were released within seven weeks due to lack of evidence, but nine sympathisers had their remand renewed on a weekly basis for almost three months, despite the police failing to produce evidence for a committal hearing. In a letter to Acting Chief Secretary Bryan O'Loghlen, Kelly accused the government of "committing a manifest injustice in imprisoning so many innocent people" and threatened reprisals. Police claimed that such threats kept their informants from giving sworn evidence.

On 22 April, police magistrate Foster refused prosecution requests to continue remands and discharged the remaining detainees. Although the police command opposed this decision, by then it was clear that the tactic of detaining sympathisers had not impeded the gang.

Jones argues that the detention strategy swung public sympathy away from the police. Dawson, however, points out that while there was widespread condemnation of the denial of the civil liberties of those detained, this did not necessarily mean support for the outlaws grew.

== Jerilderie raid ==
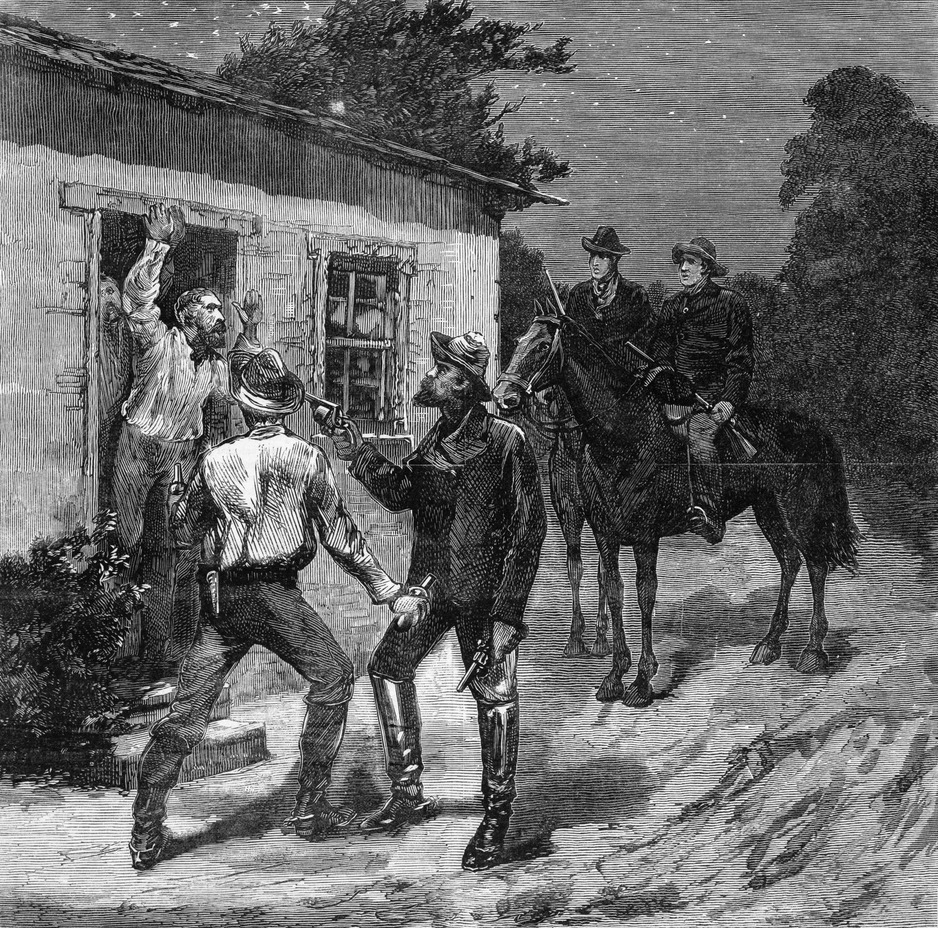
The gang bails up the Jerilderie police barracks

Following the Euroa raid, the reward for Kelly's capture increased to £1,000, and police reinforcements and soldiers were deployed across north-eastern Victoria. The gang distributed most proceeds from the raid to family and other sympathisers. Once more in need of funds, they planned to rob the bank at Jerilderie, a town across the border in NSW. Sympathisers moved into Jerilderie before the raid to provide support.

On 7 February 1879, the gang crossed the Murray River between Mulwala and Tocumwal and camped overnight in the bush. The following day they visited a hotel outside Jerilderie, where they drank and chatted with patrons and staff, learning more about the town and its police.

In the early hours of 9 February, the gang bailed up the Jerilderie police barracks and locked up the two constables present, George Devine and Henry Richards, also holding Devine's wife and children hostage overnight. The following afternoon, Byrne and Hart, disguised as police, went out with Richards to familiarise themselves with the town.

At 10 am on 10 February, Ned and Byrne donned police uniforms and took Richards into town, leaving Devine in the lockup and warning his wife they would kill her and her children if she left the barracks. The gang held up the Royal Mail Hotel and, while Dan and Hart guarded the hostages, Ned and Byrne robbed the neighbouring Bank of New South Wales of £2,141 in cash and valuables. Ned also burnt deeds, mortgages and securities, saying "the bloody banks are crushing the life's blood out of the poor, struggling man".

With hostages from the bank detained in the hotel, Byrne held up the post office and smashed its telegraph system while Ned had hostages cut down telegraph wires. After lecturing the 30 or so hostages on police corruption and the justice system, Ned threatened to shoot Richards, but ultimately relented, saying he admired his "pluck". Ned freed the hostages, except for Richards and two telegraphists, whom he secured in the lockup. Dan and Byrne then left town with the police horses and weapons. Ned remained to shout a group of sympathisers at the Albion Hotel, where he forced Hart to return a watch stolen from priest J. B. Gribble and was persuaded not to take a racehorse, as it belonged to "a young lady". After the raid, the gang went into hiding for 17 months.

=== Jerilderie Letter ===
I wish to acquaint you with some of the occurrences of the present past and future.

— Opening line of the Jerilderie Letter

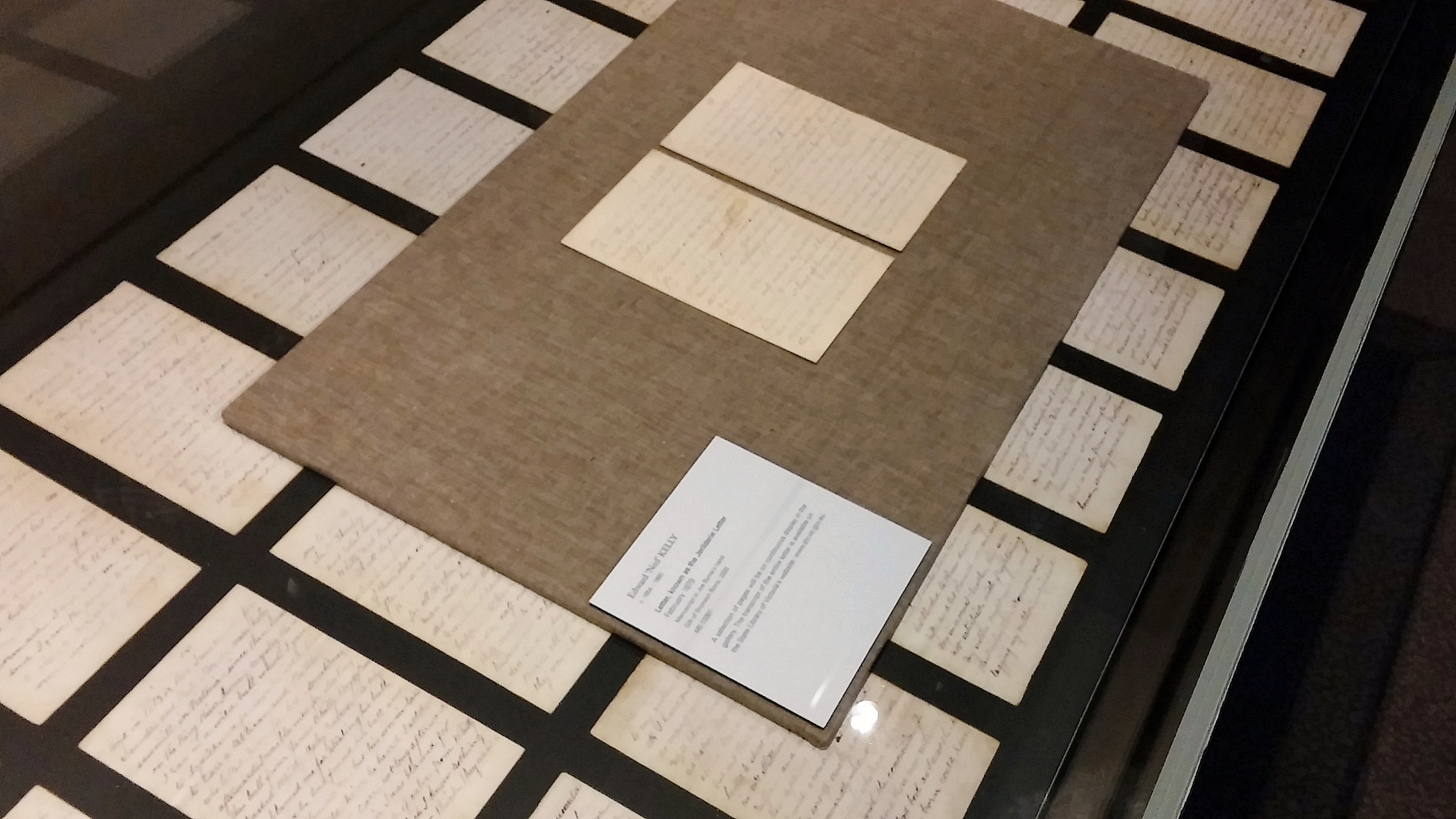
Some of the 56 pages comprising the Jerilderie Letter, on display at State Library Victoria

Prior to the raid, Kelly composed a lengthy letter with the aim of tracing his path to outlawry, justifying his actions, and outlining the alleged injustices he and his family suffered at the hands of the police. He also implores squatters to share their wealth with the rural poor, invokes a history of Irish rebellion against the English, and threatens to carry out a "colonial stratagem" designed to shock not only Victoria and its police "but also the whole British army". Dictated to Byrne, the Jerilderie Letter, a handwritten document of fifty-six pages and 7,391 words, was described by Kelly as "a bit of my life". He tasked a local bank worker with delivering it to the editor of the Jerilderie and Urana Gazette for publication. Due to political suppression, only excerpts were published in the press, based on a copy transcribed by a publican in Deniliquin. The letter was rediscovered and published in full in 1930.

According to historian Alex McDermott, "Kelly inserts himself into history, on his own terms, with his own voice. ... We hear the living speaker in a way that no other document in our history achieves". It has been interpreted as a proto-republican manifesto; an eyewitness to the raid noted that the letter suggested Kelly would have liked to have led a small army "to upset the existing government". It has also been described as a "murderous, ... maniacal rant", and "a remarkable insight into Kelly's grandiosity". Noted for its unorthodox grammar, the letter reaches "delirious poetics", Kelly's language being "hyperbolic, allusive, hallucinatory ... full of striking metaphors and images". His invective-laden humour is also present; in one well-known passage, he calls the Victorian police "a parcel of big ugly fat-necked wombat headed, big bellied, magpie legged, narrow hipped, splaw-footed sons of Irish bailiffs or English landlords". The letter closes:

neglect this and abide by the consequences, which shall be worse than the rust in the wheat of Victoria or the druth of a dry season to the grasshoppers in New South Wales I do not wish to give the order full force without giving timely warning. but I am a widows son outlawed and my orders must be obeyed.

== Reward increase and disappearance ==
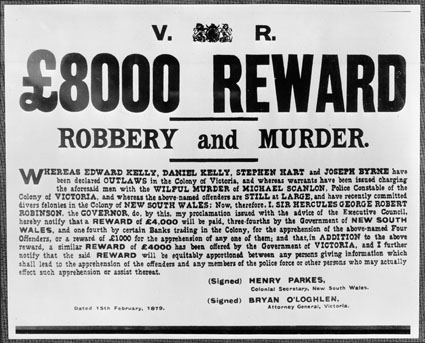
£8000 reward notice for the capture of the gang, about $3 million in modern Australian currency

In response to the Jerilderie raid, the NSW government and several banks collectively issued £4,000 for the gang's capture, dead or alive, the largest reward offered in the colony since £5,000 was placed on the heads of the outlawed Clarke brothers in 1867. The Victorian government matched the offer for the Kelly gang, bringing the total amount to £8,000, bushranging's largest-ever reward.

The Victorian police continued to receive many reports of sightings of the outlaws and information about their activities from their network of informants. Chief Commissioner of Police Frederick Standish and Superintendent Francis Augustus Hare directed operations against the gang from Benalla. Hare organised frequent search parties and surveillance of Kelly sympathisers.

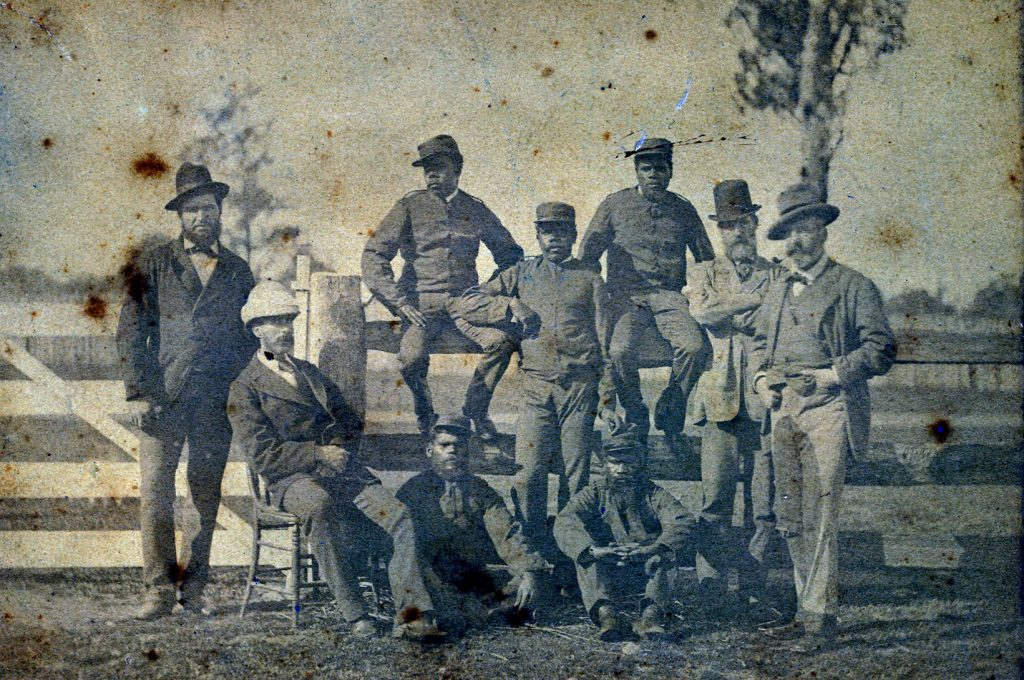
Native police unit, sent from Queensland to Victoria in 1879 to help capture the gang

In March 1879, six Queensland native police troopers and a senior constable under the command of sub-Inspector Stanhope O'Connor were deployed to Benalla to join the hunt for the gang. Although Kelly feared the tracking ability of the Aboriginal troopers, Standish and Hare doubted their value and temporarily withdrew their services.

In May 1879, on the advice of Standish, the Victorian Land Board blacklisted 86 alleged Kelly sympathisers from buying land in the secluded areas of northeastern Victoria. The aim of the policy was to disperse the gang's network of sympathisers and disrupt stock theft in the region. Jones and others claim that it caused widespread resentment and hardened support for the outlaws. Morrissey, however, states that although the policy was sometimes used unfairly, it was effective and supported by the majority of the community.

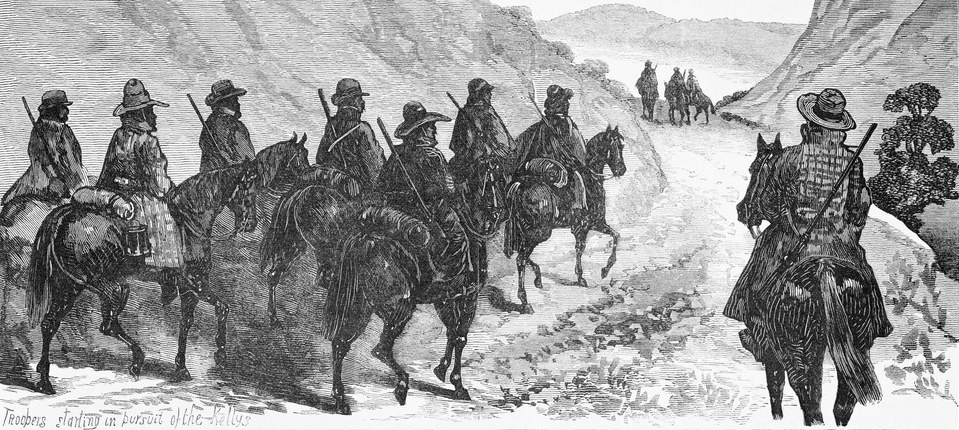
A party of troopers participating in the hunt for the Kelly gang

Facing media and parliamentary criticism over the costly and failed gang search, Standish appointed Assistant Commissioner Charles Hope Nicolson as leader of operations at Benalla on 3 July 1879. Standish reduced Nicolson's police forces, withdrew most of the soldiers guarding banks, and cut the search budget. Nicolson relied more heavily on targeted surveillance and his network of spies and informers.

After almost a year of unsuccessful efforts to capture the outlaws, Nicolson was replaced by Hare. In June 1880, police informant Daniel Kennedy reported that the gang were planning another raid and had made bullet-proof armour out of agricultural equipment. Hare dismissed the latter as preposterous and sacked Kennedy.

== Glenrowan affair ==
=== Murder of Aaron Sherritt ===
... I look upon Ned Kelly as an extraordinary man; there is no man in the world like him, he is superhuman.

— Aaron Sherritt to Superintendent Francis Augustus Hare

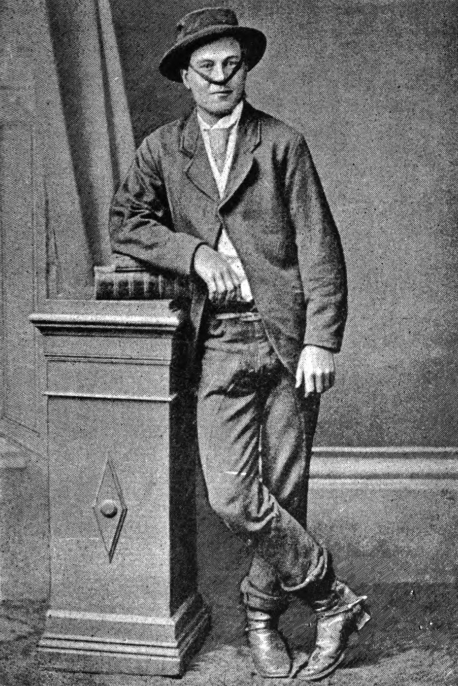
Portrait of Sherritt showing his "larrikin heel" and wearing his hat in the Greta mob fashion with the chin strap resting under his nose

During the Kelly outbreak, police watch parties monitored Byrne's mother's house in the Woolshed Valley near Beechworth. The police used the house of her neighbour, Aaron Sherritt, as a base of operations and kept watch from nearby caves at night. Sherritt, a former Greta Mob member and lifelong friend of Byrne, accepted police payments for camping with the watch parties and for informing on the gang. Detective Michael Ward doubted Sherritt's value as an informer, suspecting he lied to the police to protect Byrne.

In March 1879 Byrne's mother saw Sherritt with a police watch party and later publicly denounced him as a spy. In the following months, Byrne and Ned sent invitations to Sherritt to join the gang, but when he continued his relationship with the police, the outlaws decided to murder him as a means to launch a grander plot, one that they boasted would "astonish not only the Australian colonies but the whole world".

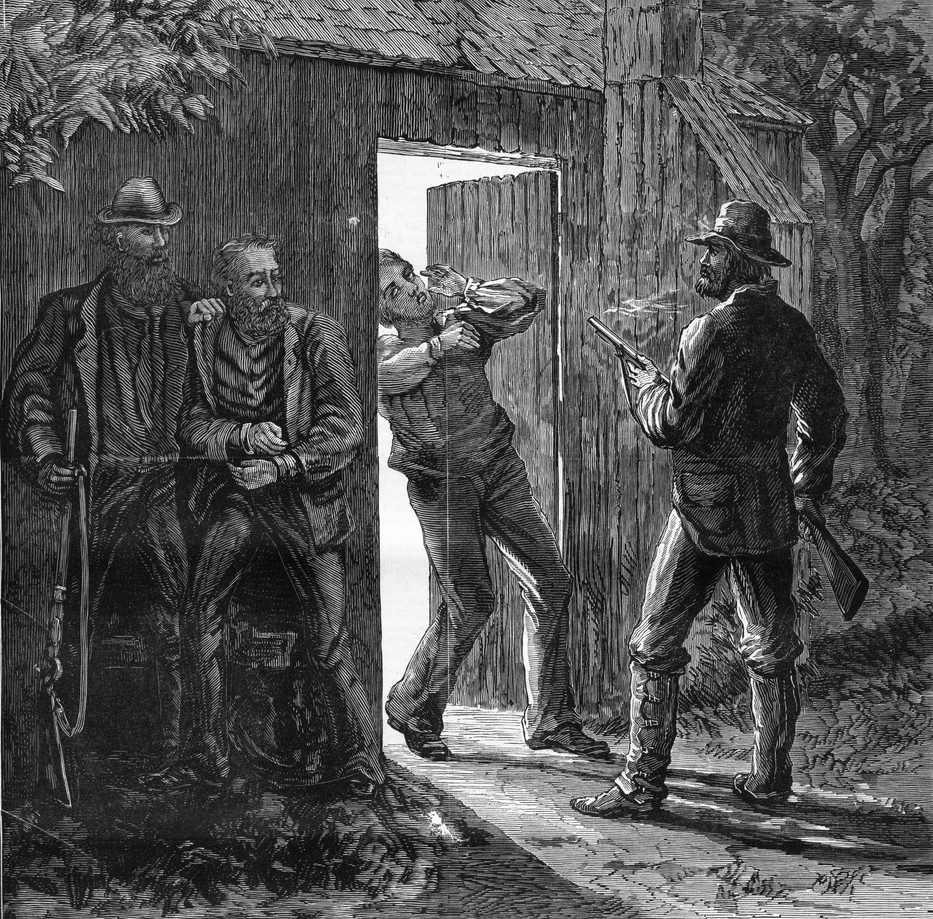
Sherritt's murder

On 26 June 1880, Dan and Byrne rode into the Woolshed Valley. That evening, they kidnapped a local gardener, Anton Wick, and took him to Sherritt's hut, which was occupied by Sherritt, his pregnant wife Ellen and her mother, and a four-man police watch party.

Byrne forced Wick to knock on the back door and call out for Sherritt. When Sherritt answered the door, Byrne shot him in the throat and chest with a shotgun, killing him. Byrne and Dan then entered the hut while the policemen hid in one of the bedrooms. Byrne overheard them scrambling for their shotguns and demanded that they come out. When they did not respond he fired into the bedroom. He then sent Ellen into the bedroom to bring the police out, but they detained her in the room.

The outlaws left the hut, collected kindling, and loudly threatened to burn alive those inside. They stayed outside for approximately two hours, yelled more threats, then released Wick and rode away.

=== Plot to wreck the police train and attack Benalla ===
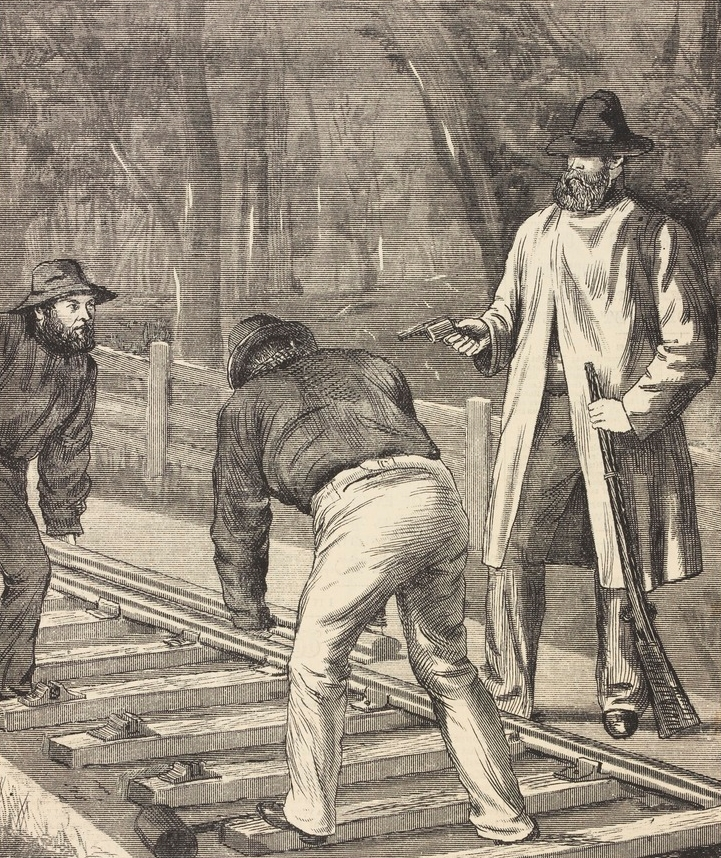
Kelly forces two railway workers to damage the track at Glenrowan in a plot to derail the police special train

The gang expected the policemen at Sherritt's to report his murder to Beechworth within a few hours, prompting a police special train to be sent from Melbourne. They surmised the train would collect reinforcements at Benalla, leaving the town under-policed, before continuing through Glenrowan, a small town in the Warby Ranges. There, the gang planned to derail the train and shoot dead any survivors, then ride for Benalla, bombing the railway bridge over the Broken River to isolate the town and allow themselves time to rob banks, bomb the police barracks, torch the courthouse, free jail inmates, and generally sow chaos.

While Byrne and Dan were in the Woolshed Valley, Ned and Hart forced two railway workers camped at Glenrowan to damage the track on a sharp curve at an incline, where the train would reach 60 mph before derailing into a deep gully. They told their captives they were going to "send the train and its occupants to hell", and justified any civilian deaths by claiming the victims "had no business accompanying the police".

The bushrangers took over Glenrowan, holding anyone they encountered hostage, with men confined at Ann Jones' Glenrowan Inn, opposite the railway station, and most women and children at the stationmaster's home. The other hotel in town, McDonnell's Railway Hotel, was used to stable the gang's horses, one carrying a keg of blasting powder and fuses. The packhorses also carried four helmeted suits of bullet-repelling armour, each made from stolen plough mouldboards, likely shaped in a crude bush forge and weighing about 44 kilograms (97 lb). Kelly conceived of the armour to protect the outlaws in shootouts with the police and planned to wear it when inspecting the train wreckage for survivors.

=== Siege and shootout ===
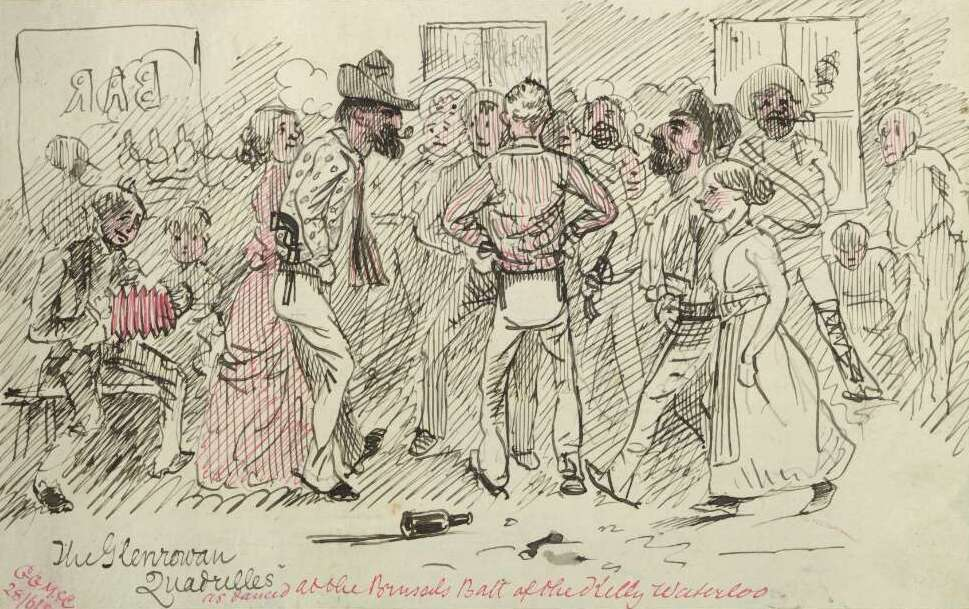
A sketch by George Gordon McCrae shows the gang dancing with hostages.

By the afternoon of 27 June, the train still had not arrived, as the policemen in Sherritt's hut remained there until morning, for fear that the bushrangers were still outside. The outlaws meanwhile had gathered all sixty-two hostages in the Glenrowan Inn, including sympathisers planted to help control the situation. As the hours passed, the gang plied the hostages with drink and organised music, singing, dancing and games. One hostage later testified, "[Kelly] did not treat us badly—not at all", although he also terrorised a young hostage by repeatedly threatening to shoot him.

Towards evening, Kelly released 21 hostages he deemed trustworthy, then captured Glenrowan's lone constable, Hugh Bracken, with the assistance of hostage Thomas Curnow, a local schoolmaster who had gained the gang's trust to thwart their plans. Believing that Curnow was a sympathiser, Kelly let him and his wife return home, warning them to "go quietly to bed and not to dream too loud".

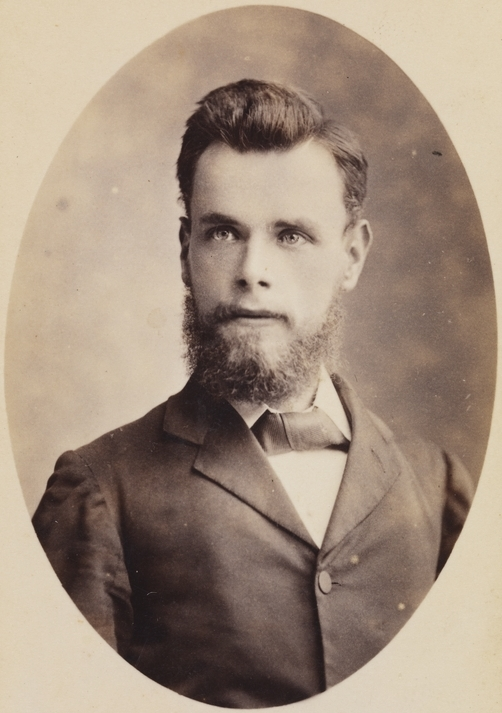
Hostage Thomas Curnow thwarted the gang's plans.

News of Sherritt's death reached the outside world at midday, and at 9 pm, a police special train left Melbourne for Beechworth with four journalists, sub-Inspector O'Connor, his native police unit, wife and sister-in-law. They stopped at Benalla at 1:30 am to take on Superintendent Hare, seven troopers and a civilian volunteer, raising the passenger count to 27, and attached a carriage of police horses. Hare ordered a pilot engine to scout ahead. One hour later, as the pilot approached Glenrowan, Curnow signalled it to stop and alerted the driver of the danger. The pilot and the special then proceeded cautiously for Glenrowan.

Around 3 am, Kelly decided to free the hostages and was giving them a final lecture on the police when the train arrived. The outlaws donned their armour and prepared for a confrontation. Meanwhile, Bracken escaped to the railway station to warn Hare and O'Connor, who then led their men towards the hotel.

The outlaws lined up in the shadow of the hotel's porch and, when the police appeared about 30 m away in the moonlight, opened fire. About 150 shots were exchanged in the first volleys, during which the outlaws withdrew inside the hotel. Someone shouted that women and children were present, prompting a ceasefire. Hare was shot through the left wrist and, fainting from blood loss, returned to Benalla for treatment. Jimmy, an Aboriginal trooper, sustained a glancing head wound and rejoined the fight once bandaged. Ned was shot in the left arm and right foot; Byrne in the calf. Several hostages were wounded by police fire into the weatherboard building, two fatally: thirteen-year-old John Jones and railway worker Martin Cherry. A third, George Metcalf, was either killed by police crossfire or shot accidentally by Ned.

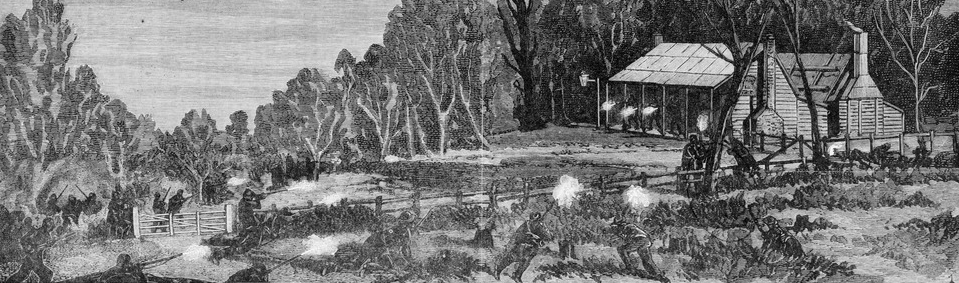
The gang and police exchange gunfire. Drawing by Tom Carrington, one of several journalists present during the battle.

During the lull in gunfire, with the scene shrouded in thick gunpowder smoke, a number of hostages, mostly women and children, escaped the hotel; however, several others were driven back after police fired on them in the confusion. Meanwhile, Kelly, bleeding heavily, retreated about 90 m into the bush behind the hotel, where police found his skull cap and rifle at around 3.30 am. Kelly was lying in the bush nearby.

Police surrounded the hotel throughout the night, and the firing continued intermittently. At about 5:30 am, Byrne was fatally shot while drinking whisky in the bar, his last words being a toast to the gang. Over the next two hours, police reinforcements under Sergeant Steele and Superintendent Sadleir arrived from Wangaratta and Benalla, bringing the police contingent to about forty.

=== Last stand and capture ===
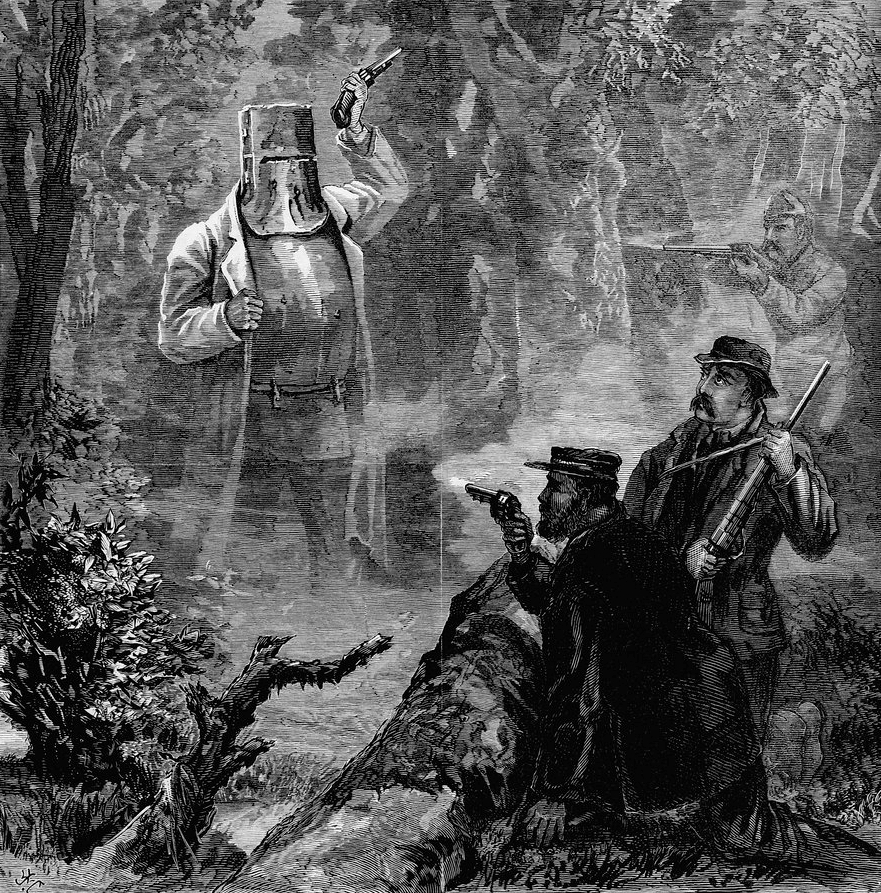
"A strange apparition": when Kelly appeared out of the mist-shrouded bush, clad in armour, bewildered policemen took him to be a ghost, a bunyip, and "Old Nick himself".

Weakened by blood loss and occasionally losing consciousness, Kelly lay in the bush for most of the night. At dawn (around 7 am), clad in armour and armed with three handguns, he rose and attacked the police from their rear. Several police returned fire as he moved from tree to tree towards the hotel, staggering from his injuries, the weight of his armour, and the impact of bullets on the plate iron, which he later described as "like blows from a man's fist". His left arm, "almost totally disabled" from the opening shootout, limited his ability to aim, fire, and reload.

Eyewitnesses struggled to identify the figure moving in the dim misty light and, astonished as it withstood bullets, variously called it a ghost, a bunyip, and the devil. Journalist Tom Carrington wrote:

With the steam rising from the ground, it looked for all the world like the ghost of Hamlet's father with no head, only a very long thick neck ... It was the most extraordinary sight I ever saw or read of in my life, and I felt fairly spellbound with wonder, and I could not stir or speak.

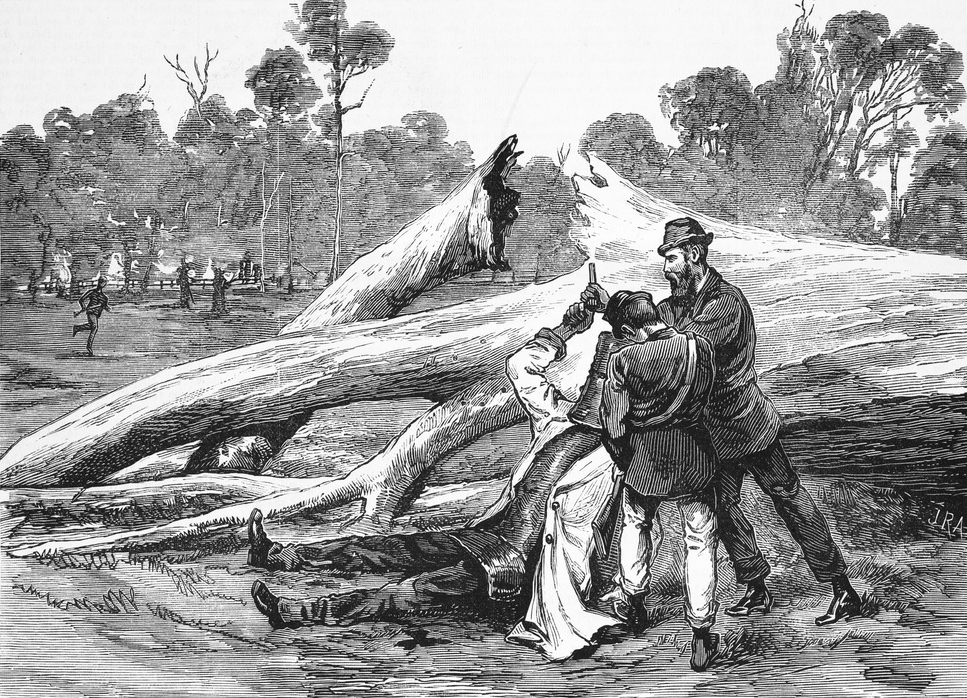
Sergeant Steele and railway guard Dowsett capture Kelly.

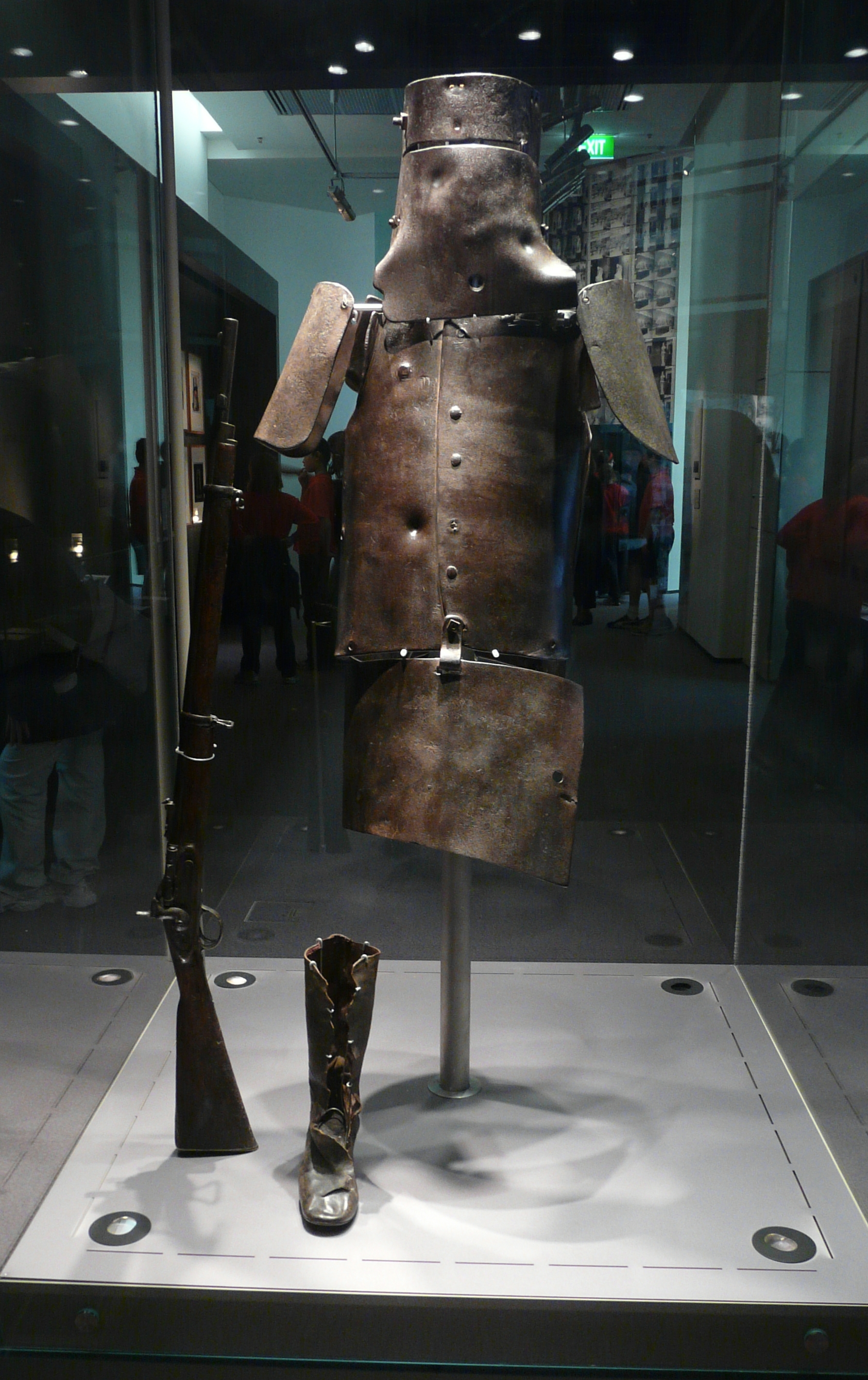
Kelly's armour on display at State Library Victoria. The helmet, breastplate, backplate and shoulder plates show 18 bullet marks. Also on display are Kelly's Snider Enfield rifle and one of his boots from the siege.

The gunfight lasted around 15 minutes, with Dan and Hart providing covering fire from the hotel. It ended when Steele brought down Ned with two shotgun blasts to his unprotected legs and thighs. Ned was disarmed and divested of his armour by police while Dan and Hart continued firing. Dan was wounded by return fire as Ned was carried to the railway station, where a doctor attended to him. He was later found to have twenty-eight wounds, including serious gunshot wounds to his left elbow and right foot, several flesh wounds caused by gunshots, and cuts and abrasions from bullets striking his armour, which bore 18 bullet marks, including five on the helmet.

In the meantime, the siege continued. Around 10 am, a ceasefire was called and the remaining thirty hostages left the hotel. They were ordered to lie down as police checked for any outlaws among them. Two of the hostages were arrested for being known Kelly sympathisers.

=== Fire and aftermath ===
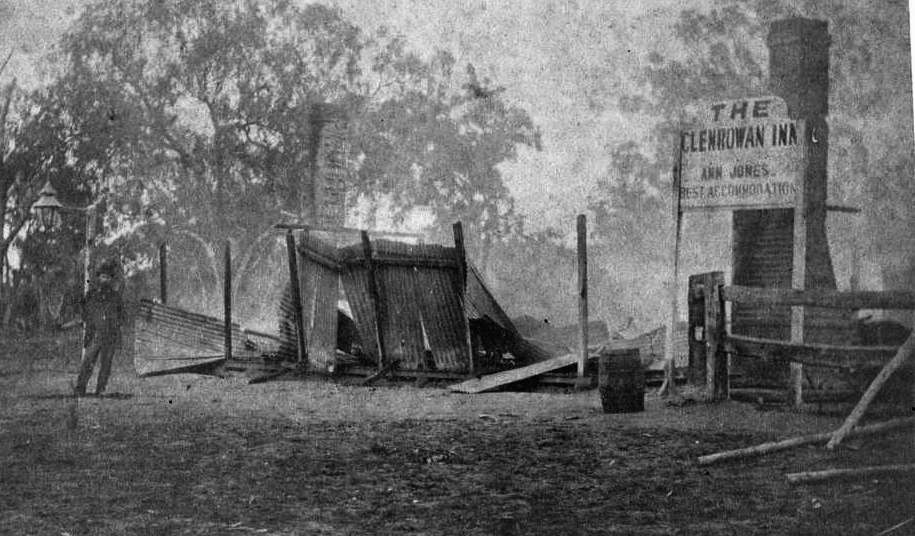
Ruins of Jones's Hotel after the fire

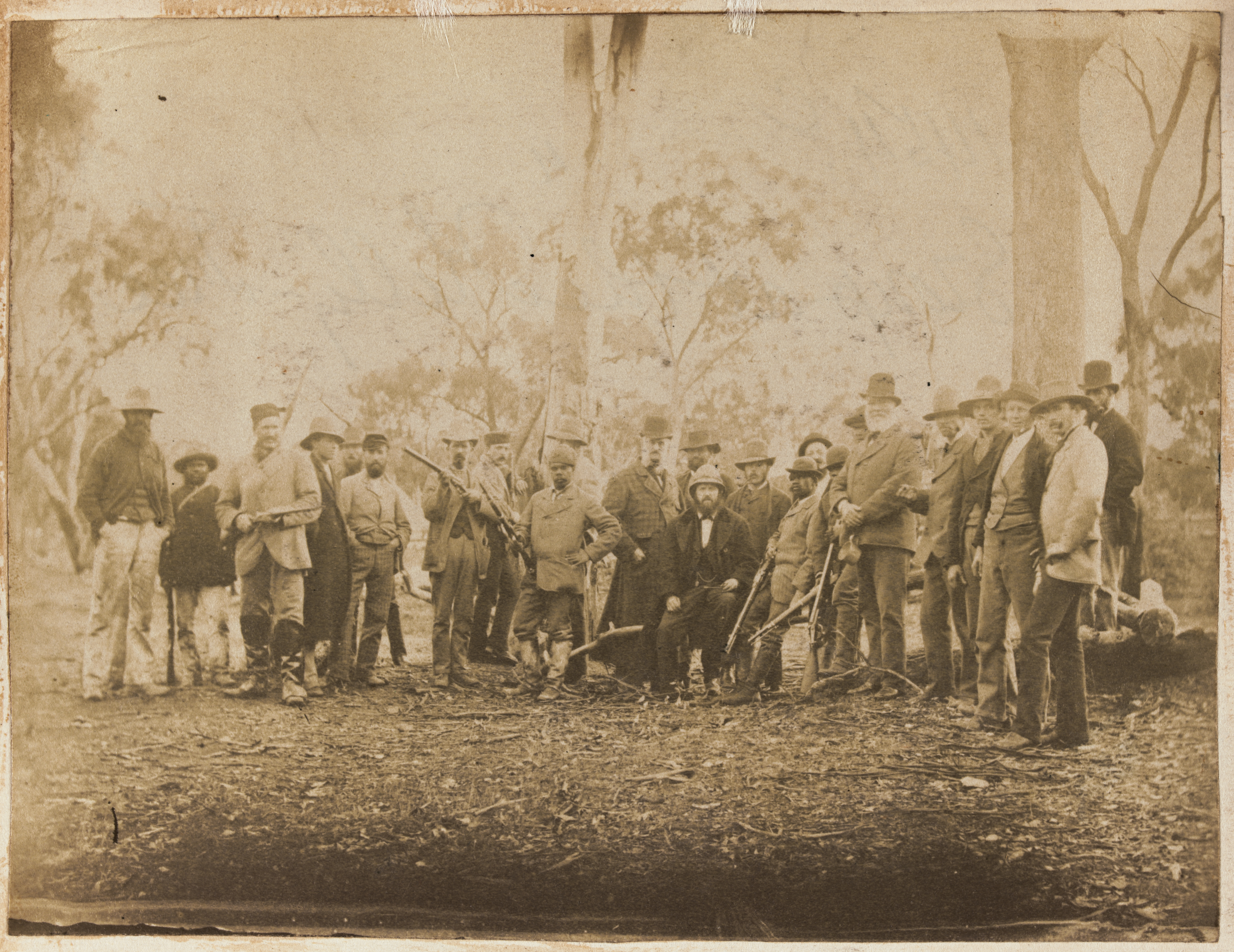
Police and Aboriginal trackers pose in front of the "Kelly Tree", the fallen gum tree where Kelly was captured

By the afternoon of 28 June, some 600 spectators had gathered at Glenrowan, and Dan and Hart had ceased shooting. Forbidding his men from storming the hotel, Sadleir ordered a cannon from Melbourne to bombard it before ultimately deciding to burn out the bushrangers. At 2:50 pm, Senior Constable Charles Johnson, under cover of police fire, set the hotel alight.

Passing through the area, the Catholic priest Matthew Gibney halted his travels to administer the last rites to Kelly, then entered the burning hotel in an attempt to rescue anyone inside. He found the bodies of Byrne, Dan and Hart. The causes of Dan and Hart's deaths remain uncertain. Police retrieved Byrne's body and rescued the mortally wounded Martin Cherry. After the fire died out at 4 pm, the police recovered the charred remains of Dan and Hart.

Other hostages wounded during the shootout were Michael Reardon and his baby sister Bridget (who was grazed by a bullet), and Jones' sister Jane, who received a head wound from a stray bullet and later died from a lung infection that her mother believed was hastened by the injury.

Following the siege, Kelly was taken to Benalla, where doctors determined his injuries were likely non-fatal. Outside the lockup where Kelly was held, Byrne's body was strung up and photographed, with casts taken of his head and limbs for a waxwork, later exhibited in Melbourne. Sympathisers asked for his body, but the police arranged a hasty inquiry and burial in an unmarked grave in Benalla Cemetery. Dan and Hart were buried by their families in unmarked graves in Greta Cemetery.

Kelly was transported to Melbourne Gaol, where he recuperated in the hospital wing and was allowed a visit from his mother, who was still serving her sentence for her role in the Fitzpatrick incident. Four weeks later, having made sufficient recovery from his wounds, he was taken to Beechworth for his committal hearing.

== Trial and execution ==
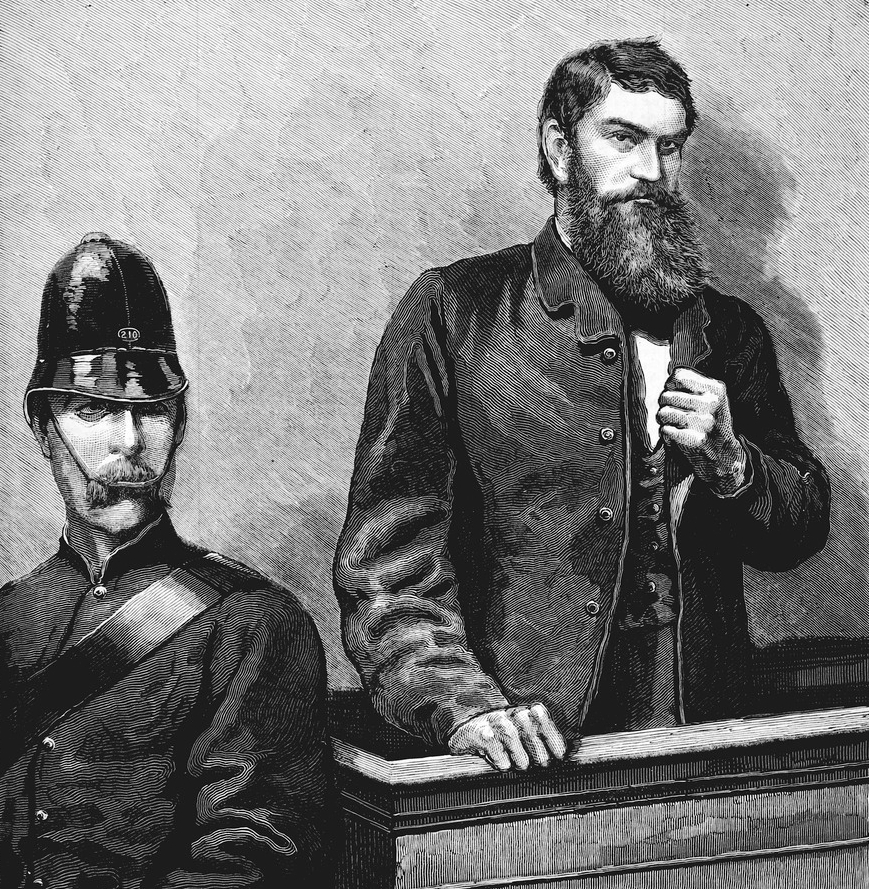
Kelly at Beechworth Court

Kelly's committal hearing took place at Beechworth Court in August 1880, with the MP and lawyer David Gaunson acting as his attorney. According to Alex Castles, despite expecting a guilty verdict, Kelly wanted Gaunson to argue that police persecution had driven him to bushranging and that the Stringybark Creek killings were acts of self-defence. Gaunson interviewed him on these matters and paraphrased it for The Age. He later said that although he believed Kelly shot the police out of genuine fear for his life, he found his broader stance on police to be untenable and irrational, particularly the view that they were akin to soldiers and thus justified targets of violence.

Kelly was committed for trial on charges of murdering Lonigan and Scanlan. Initially set for Beechworth, the trial was transferred to the Central Criminal Court in Melbourne. While some, including legal experts such as John Harber Phillips, argue the transfer was to secure a conviction from a less sympathetic jury outside the northeast, others, like Castles, contend it was mainly due to fears of jury tampering by Kelly sympathisers.

Kelly's trial began on 19 October 1880 before Sir Redmond Barry, the judge who had sentenced his mother over the Fitzpatrick incident. The novice barrister Henry Bindon appeared for Kelly, with Gaunson serving as counsel. The trial was adjourned to 28 October, and the prosecution reduced the charges to Lonigan's murder, based on McIntyre's testimony that Kelly alone had shot him. Kelly pleaded not guilty. He was convicted and sentenced to death by hanging. During a verbal exchange with Barry, Kelly, while stating that he anticipated the verdict and did not fear death, criticised the conduct of the trial and maintained that his bushranging was morally justified. Barry concluded with the customary words, "May God have mercy on your soul." Kelly replied, "I will see you there where I go." The retort later entered folklore as a prophetic "curse", with accounts noting that Barry died from illness 12 days after Kelly's execution.

On 3 November, the Executive Council of Victoria announced that Kelly was to be hanged on 11 November at the Melbourne Gaol. In response, thousands turned out at protests in Melbourne demanding a reprieve for Kelly and a failed petition for clemency attracted over 32,000 signatures. The press was uniformly scathing: one journalist called the protests "inflammatory, seditious and plainly useless"; another saw the public sympathy for Kelly as further evidence of what they called "a socialistic revolt of class against class" in Victoria. Police reinforcements were mobilised to guard the jail and other government buildings in Melbourne in case of a mob attack.

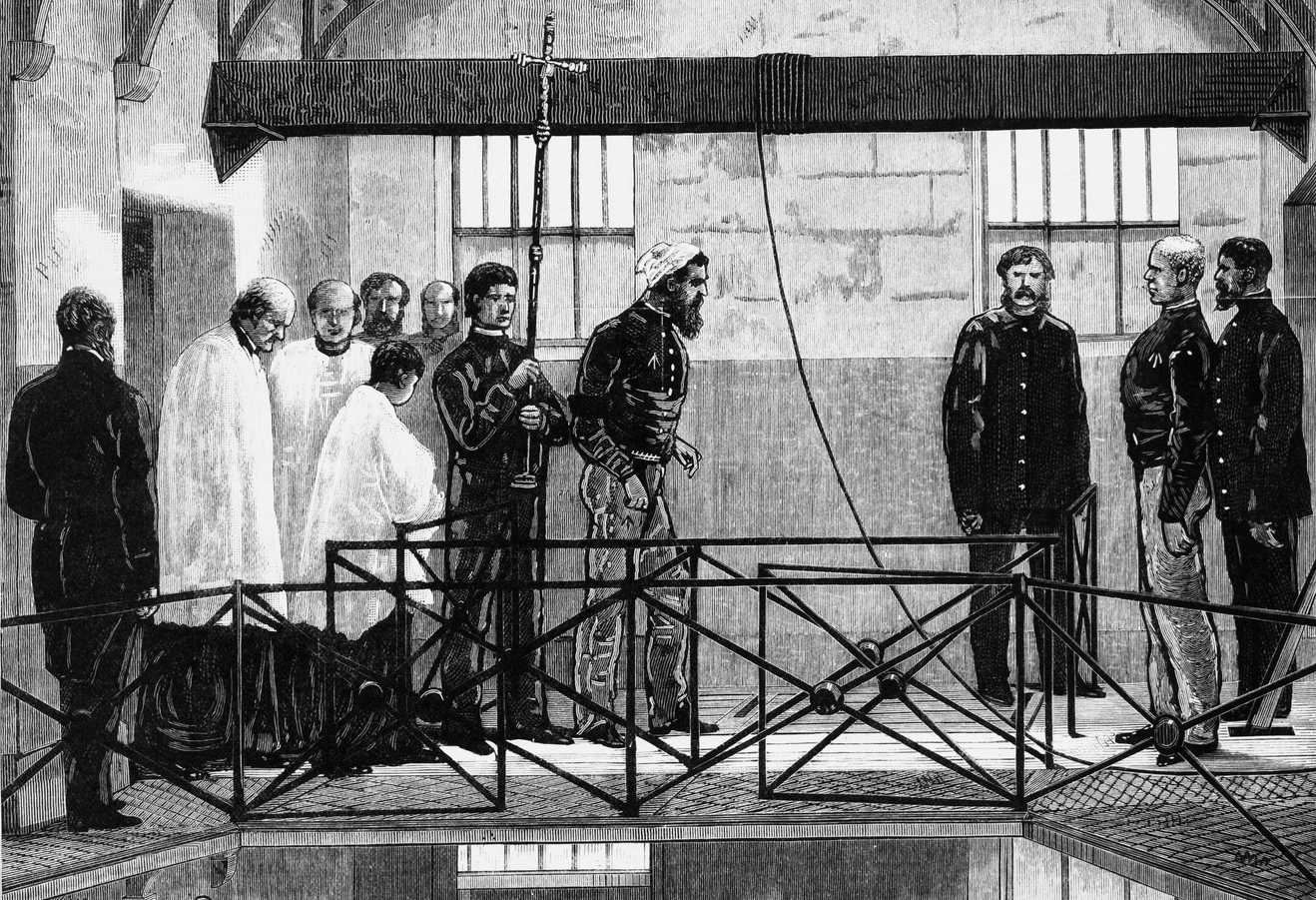
Kelly at the gallows

The day before his execution, Kelly had his photographic portrait taken as a keepsake for his family and was granted farewell meetings with relatives. According to tradition, his mother's last words to him were, "Mind you die like a Kelly, son." (Note: The quote originates from the Daily Telegraph, 12 November 1880. Jones suggests it is more likely that Ellen said, "I mind you'll die like a Kelly, son." Castles questions whether she would have said anything like it at all, given her estrangement from John "Red" Kelly's family in the years after his death.)

On the morning of his execution, Kelly prayed and, passing the jail's garden on the way to the gallows, remarked that it was pretty, but said little else. He was hanged at 10 am. There is uncertainty surrounding Kelly's last words; one journalist present reported that he said "Such is life" on the scaffold, although the quote may have originated from an exchange earlier that morning in his cell, when the warden informed him of his execution time. Another account states that Kelly intended to make a speech, but instead remarked with a sigh, "Ah, well, I suppose". A police eyewitness later said that, just before the cap was drawn, Kelly glanced up at the skylight and muttered something too quiet to discern.

== Royal commission and aftermath ==
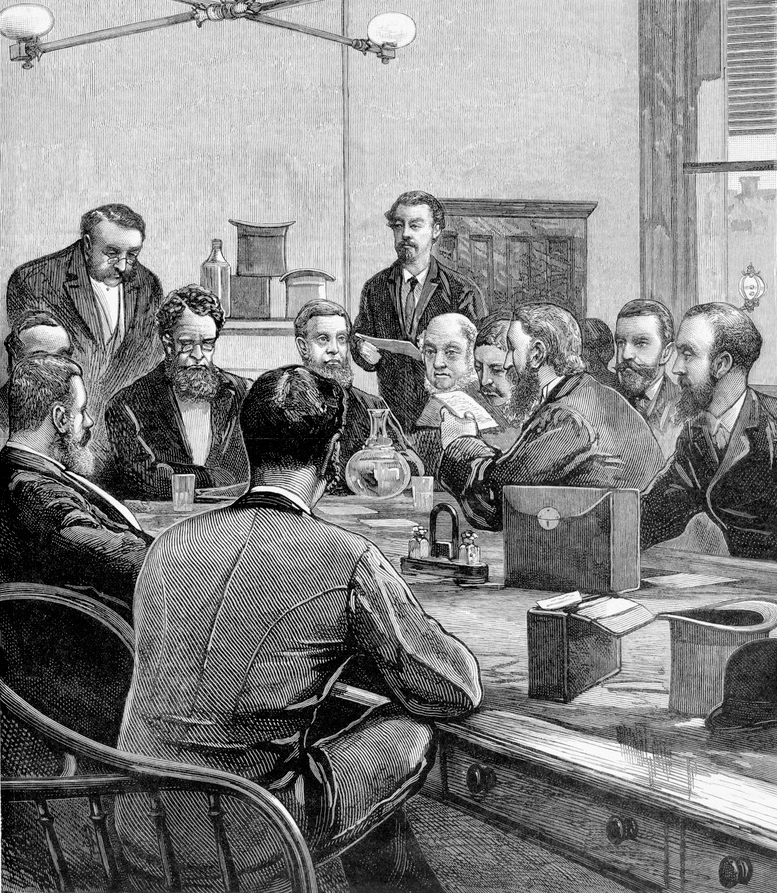
The royal commission into police conduct during the Kelly outbreak resulted in many force members being censured, reprimanded, demoted, suspended or dismissed

In March 1881, the Victorian government approved a royal commission into the conduct of the Victorian police during the Kelly outbreak. Over the next six months, the commission, chaired by Francis Longmore, held sixty-six meetings, examined sixty-two witnesses and visited towns throughout "Kelly Country". While its report found that the police had acted properly in relation to the criminality of the Kellys, it exposed widespread corruption and ended a number of police careers, including that of Chief Commissioner Standish. Numerous other officers, including senior staff, were reprimanded, demoted or suspended. It concluded with a list of thirty-six recommendations for reform.

Kelly hoped that his death would lead to an investigation into police conduct, and although the report did not exonerate him or his gang, its findings were said to strip the authorities "of what scanty rags of reputation the Kellys had left them."

The £8,000 reward money was divided among claimants, with £6,000 allocated to Victorian police and £800, the largest individual share, going to Hare. After Curnow objected to his payout of £550, it was increased to £1,000. Seven Aboriginal trackers were each awarded £50, but the Victorian and Queensland governments kept the money, claiming they were unable to responsibly use it.

There was widespread speculation that Kelly's execution would lead to further outbreaks of violence in north-eastern Victoria. Jones and Dawson argue that changes in policing methods reduced this threat. The police no longer pursued a policy of dispersing Kelly sympathisers by denying them land in the district, and assured them that they would be treated fairly if they kept the peace. During the royal commission, there were threats of violence and intimidation against people who had assisted the police. Nevertheless, the police reported a reduction in stock theft and crime in general in north-eastern Victoria following Kelly's death.

Kelly's mother was released from prison in February 1881. Jones states that she met with Greta police constable Robert Graham soon after, and they reached an understanding which helped reduce tension in the community.

== Remains and graves ==
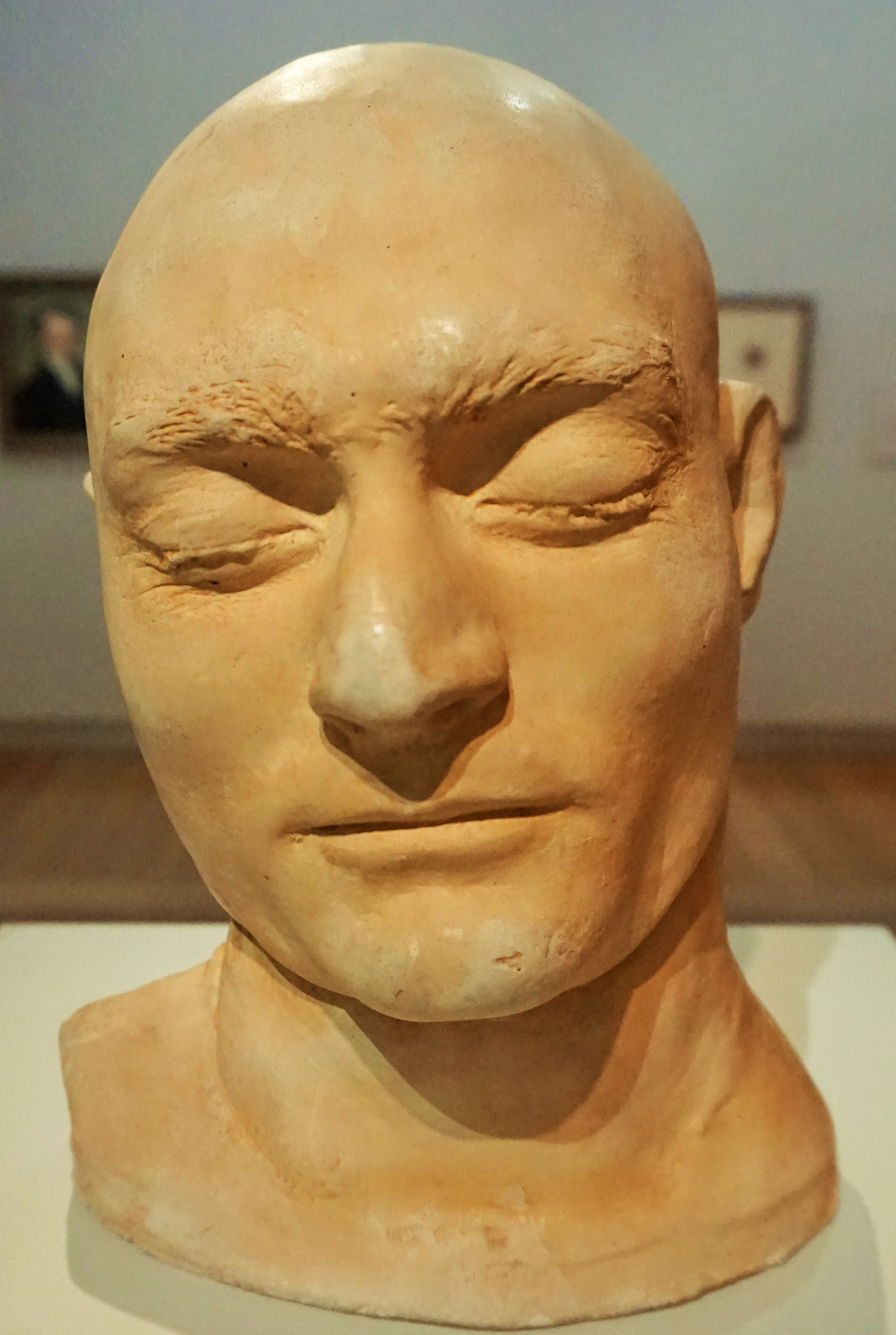
Kelly's death mask on display in the National Portrait Gallery

Kelly was buried at the Old Melbourne Gaol in what was known as the "old men's yard". In May 1881, reports emerged that Kelly's body had been illegally dissected by medical students. Amid fears of civil unrest over the rumour, the jail's governor denied it had occurred.

In 1929, the gaol was closed for demolition work, during which the remains of felons were uncovered. Before reinterment in a mass grave at Pentridge Prison, skeletal parts were looted from graves by workers and spectators, including from one marked with the initials "E.K.", situated apart from the others. The skull from this grave was handed to police and stored by the Victorian Penal Department, then at the Australian Institute of Anatomy, Canberra, in 1934. It went missing but was later found in a safe. From 1972, it was exhibited at the Old Melbourne Gaol until it was stolen in 1978.

In 2008, archaeologists announced they had likely found Kelly's burial site at Pentridge Prison, among the remains of 32 executed felons. The skull that was stolen in 1978 was submitted for forensic testing along with the Pentridge remains, which concluded in 2011 the skull was not Kelly's. Kelly's skeleton was identified among the Pentridge remains through DNA and comparisons to bullet wounds he received at Glenrowan. Most of the skull is missing, with the occipital bone showing cuts consistent with dissection.

In 2012, the Victorian government approved the handover of Kelly's bones to his family, who arranged his final burial and also appealed for the return of his skull, without success. On 20 January 2013, following a Requiem Mass at St Patrick's Catholic Church, Wangaratta, Kelly's remains were buried in accordance with his wishes in consecrated ground at Greta Cemetery, near his mother's unmarked grave. It was encased in concrete to prevent looting.

Kelly's original headstone, along with those of other felons executed at the Old Melbourne Gaol, was repurposed during the Great Depression to construct bluestone walls protecting Melbourne's beaches from erosion.

== Legacy ==
=== Kelly myth ===
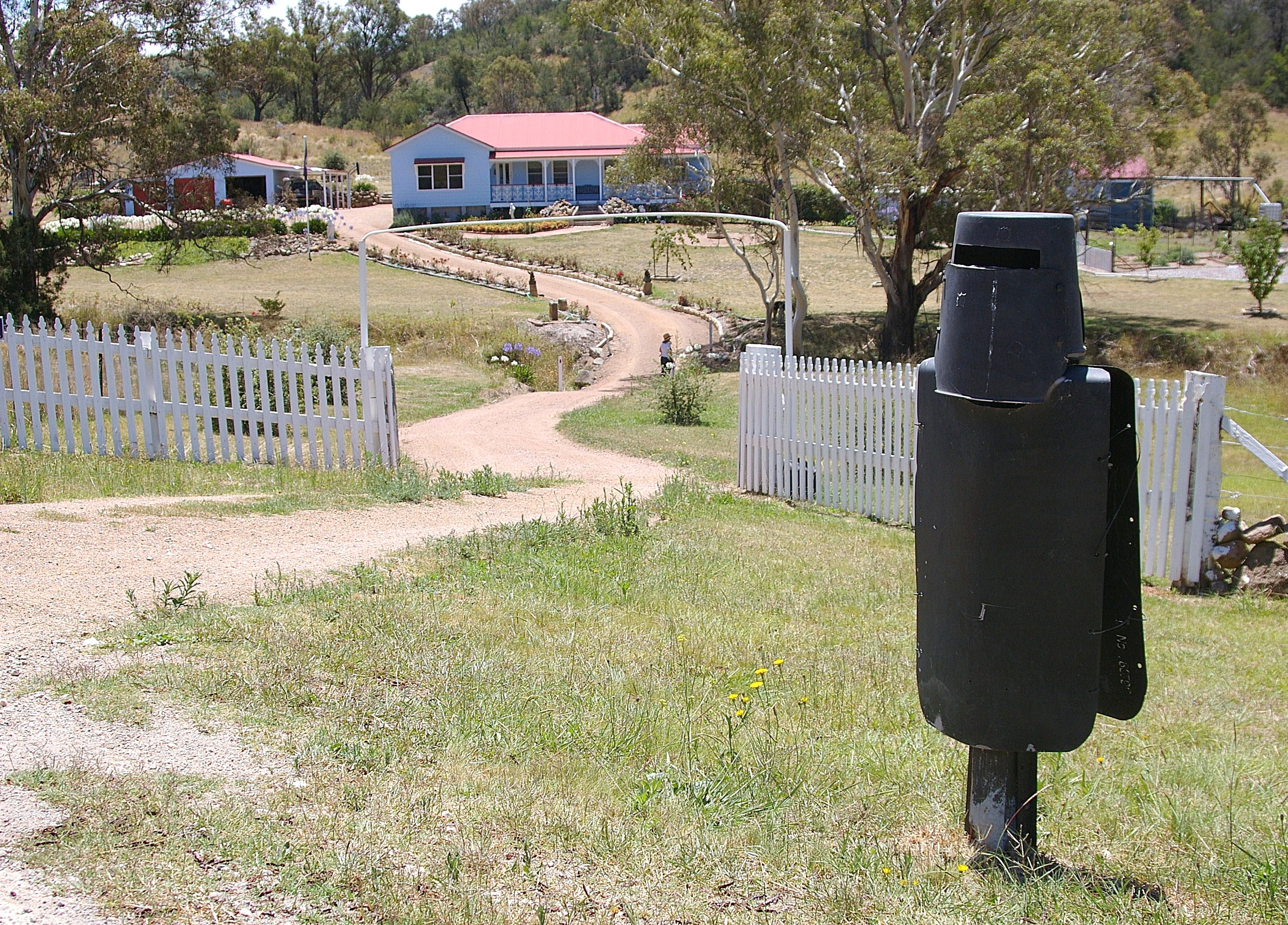
A homemade letterbox in the style of Kelly's armour, rural NSW

The myth surrounding Kelly pervades Australian culture, and he is one of Australia's most recognised national symbols. Academic and folklorist Graham Seal writes:

Ned Kelly has progressed from outlaw to national hero in a century, and to international icon in a further 20 years. The still-enigmatic, slightly saturnine and ever-ambivalent bushranger is the undisputed, if not universally admired, national symbol of Australia.

Seal argues that for many Australians who admire Kelly, he embodies traits associated with the national character, such as defying authority, siding with the underdog, and fighting bravely for one's beliefs. His disputed last words, "Such is life", have likewise been said to reflect a characteristically Australian attitude towards adversity, and are "as much a part of the Kelly mythology as the famous armour". During World War I, the image of Kelly making his last stand at Glenrowan—"returning, terribly wounded, into the fray to rescue his brother and friend"—was upheld as an exemplar of mateship and used to rally diggers on the front lines.

According to Jones, after Kelly's death a "Robin Hood-like figure" survived in popular imagination: brave, clever, chivalrous, loyal to his family and a friend to the poor. Seal argues that the gang actively cultivated their own myth, with their raids serving in part as public performances where they sought to live up to the romantic image of the bushranger-hero. This image is reflected in an anonymous public letter later attributed to the gang by historians, which describes their actions as "more like those of four sisters of charity than four outlaws", claiming they never harmed ordinary citizens but targeted only banks, the police, and the Government.

The notion of Kelly as a victim of police persecution has long been central to the myth. Reviewing an 1881 performance of the Kelly gang play Ostracised, staged at Melbourne's Princess Theatre, The Australasian wrote:

... judging from the way in which the applause was dealt out, it was pretty certain that the exploits of the outlaws excited admiration and prompted emulation. ... In short Ostracised will help to confirm the belief, in the young mind of Victoria, that the Kellys were martyrs and not sanguinary ruffians.

By the time Kelly was outlawed, bushranging was an anachronism. Australia was highly urbanised, the telegraph and the railway were rapidly connecting the bush to the city, and Kelly was already an icon for a romanticised past. Macintyre states that Kelly turning agricultural equipment into armour was an irresistible symbol of a passing era. For Seal, the failure of the gang to derail the train at Glenrowan was a symbol of the triumph of modern civilisation.

The Kelly myth has faced substantial critique despite its longevity. Dawson argues that it ignores the fear and threats Kelly imposed on the communities he was said to defend and challenges the view that police persecution drove him to lawlessness, citing his early criminal history, including the theft of livestock from poor farmers. In their study of his behaviour, Ian MacFarlane and Russ Scott suggest that Kelly exhibited psychopathic traits, such as pathological lying and a lack of empathy. For Geoffrey Robertson, Kelly's folk hero status is undeserved, adding that while some police were corrupt, it did not justify the outlaw's "bloodthirsty rampage".

The national image of Kelly, Seal writes, may bear "about the same resemblance" to the man as his armour does "to the plough mouldboards from which it was beaten". He concludes:

He is different things to different people—a murderer, an Australian Robin Hood, a social bandit, a revolutionary leader, even a commercial commodity. But to most of us he is somehow essentially Australian.

=== Cultural impact ===
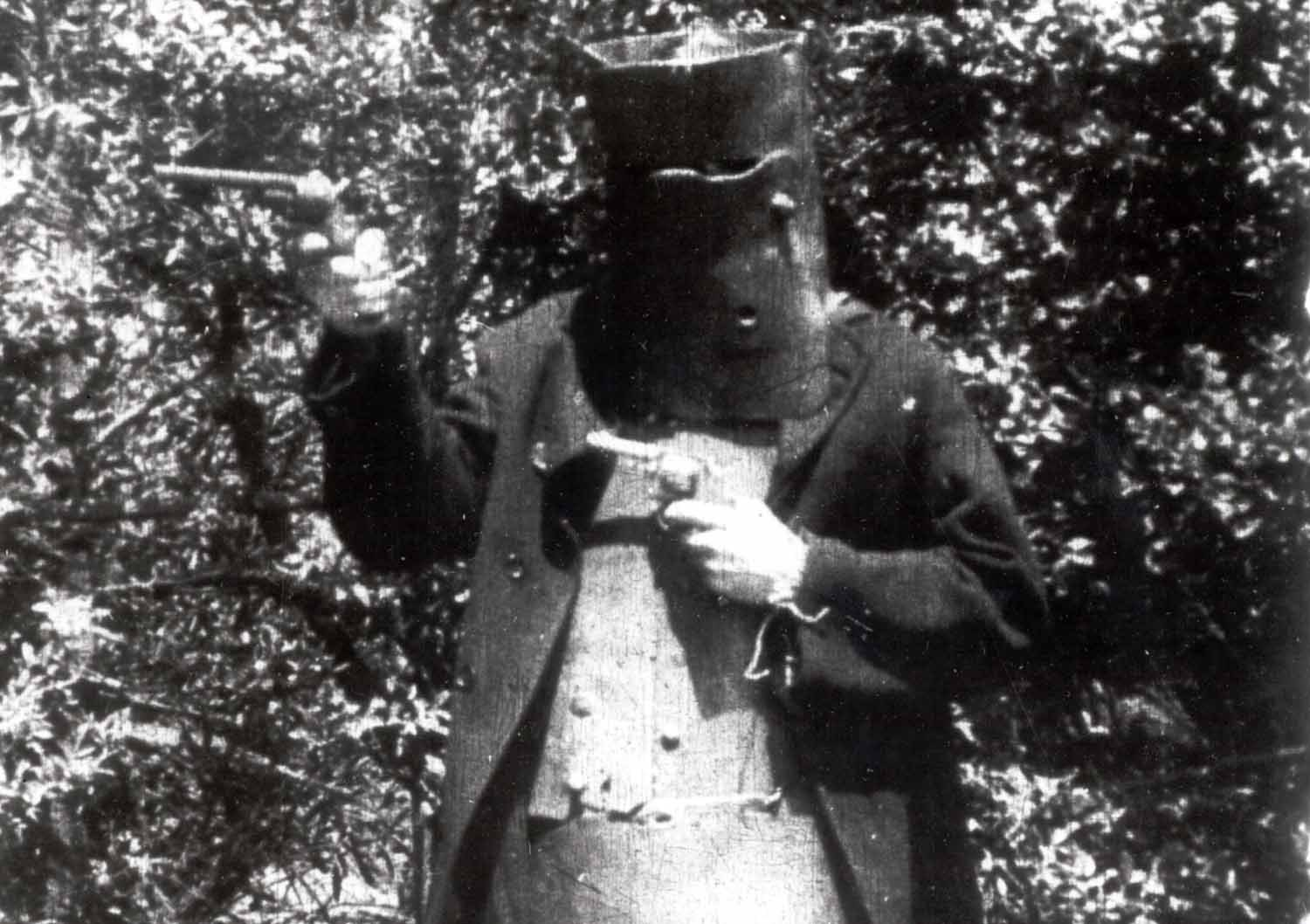
An actor playing Kelly in The Story of the Kelly Gang (1906), the world's first dramatic feature-length film

The Glenrowan affair became an international media event, and accounts of Kelly's last stand in homemade armour helped secure his and the gang's lasting fame. Literary, artistic, and media portrayals have since proliferated; by 1942, more books had been written about Kelly than any other Australian, and by 1996, the total had exceeded 100.

Within eight weeks of the Stringybark Creek killings, a play about the gang, Vultures of the Wombat Ranges, was being staged in Melbourne. The farce Catching the Kellys debuted the following year. By 1900, Kelly gang plays were "appearing all over the continent in a remarkably successful exploitation of popular myth". Later plays include Douglas Stewart's 1942 verse drama Ned Kelly.

The first ballads about the gang appeared in 1878, some of the earliest attributed to Joe Byrne and often set to the tunes of Irish rebel songs. They quickly became a popular form of social protest despite colonial governments banning public performances. In 1939, country singer Tex Morton recorded a song about Kelly, followed by recordings from Slim Dusty and American artists Kris Kristofferson and Johnny Cash.

Robert Drewe's novel Our Sunshine (1991) is a fictionalised account of the Glenrowan siege. Peter Carey won the 2001 Booker Prize for his novel True History of the Kelly Gang, narrated by Kelly and written in a style that imitates, and occasionally quotes the Jerilderie Letter. The Ned Kelly Awards are Australia's premier prizes for crime fiction and true crime writing.

Kelly has figured prominently in Australian cinema since the 1906 release of The Story of the Kelly Gang, the world's first dramatic feature-length film. Among those who have portrayed him on screen are Australian rules football player Bob Chitty (The Glenrowan Affair, 1951), rock musician Mick Jagger (Ned Kelly, 1970) and Heath Ledger (Ned Kelly, 2003). A comic film, Reckless Kelly (1993), drew on the Kelly legend.

In the visual arts, Sidney Nolan's 1946–47 Kelly series is considered "one of the greatest sequences of Australian painting of the twentieth century". His stylised depiction of Kelly's helmet has become an iconic Australian image. An "army" of performers dressed as "Nolanesque Kellys" starred in the opening ceremony of the 2000 Sydney Olympics.

Kelly has become a popular source for character design in contemporary graphic and interactive media. The DC Comics supervillain Swagman takes inspiration from his armour and outlaw persona. While some video games feature Kelly directly, others, such as Rockstar Games' Red Dead series, incorporate elements of his iconography.

"Kelly Country" refers to the rural districts of north-eastern Victoria. "Kelly tourism" is a drawcard for the area, with many local attractions and businesses centred on his story. "Kellyana" encompasses Kelly-themed books, memorabilia and other collectibles. His name has also inspired everyday expressions, for example "as game as Ned Kelly", used to denote behaviour that is courageous but reckless, as well as terms like the "Ned Kelly beard", a style of facial hair.

=== Controversy over political legacy ===
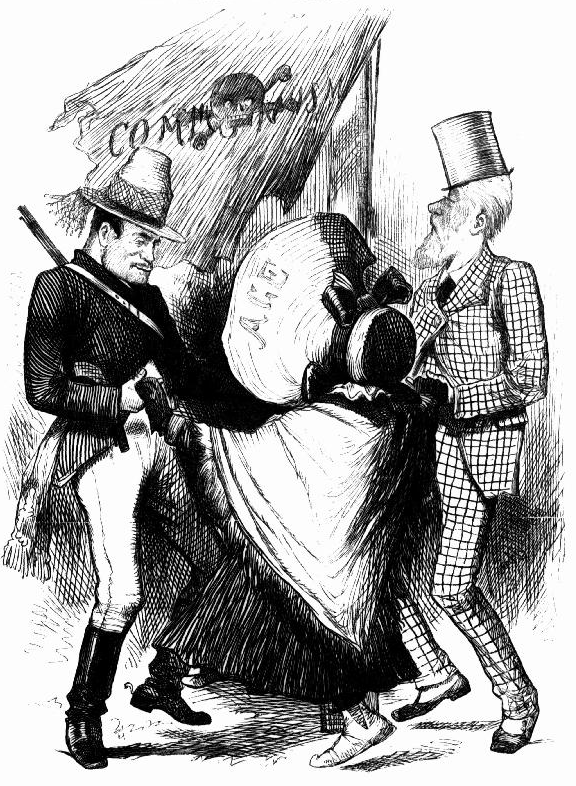
"Our Rulers" (1879), a satirical cartoon from Melbourne Punch, shows Kelly, Premier Graham Berry, and a personification of The Age dancing around a flag labelled 'communism'. Scholar Lyn Innes writes that it aligns Kelly with radical reformers challenging Victoria's squattocracy.

In Bandits (1969), Eric Hobsbawm associates Kelly with the mythology of the social bandit, a type of peasant outlaw and symbol of social rebellion with significant community support. Expanding on this thesis, McQuilton links the Kelly outbreak to increased poverty in north-eastern Victoria in the 1870s and a conflict over land between selectors (mostly small-scale farmers) and squatters (mostly wealthier pastoralists with greater political influence). McQuilton, Jones and others argue that Kelly was a political rebel with considerable support among local selectors. Through what he terms the "Glenrowan campaign", Jones writes that Kelly aimed to incite a rebellion of disaffected selectors and declare a "Republic of North-eastern Victoria". For Jones, a republic is foreshadowed in the Jerilderie Letter and Kelly's references to the north-east as "our country", where politicians should not interfere.

Morrissey argues that McQuilton and Jones have overstated both the economic distress and the level of support for Kelly among selectors. As for the alleged republican declaration or plan for a political rebellion, Dawson found no supporting documentary evidence, concluding that it grew out of early 20th-century mythmaking. Robertson characterises the Glenrowan plot as an act of criminal terrorism. According to Mark McKenna, Kelly's rhetoric in the Jerilderie Letter "may fit the mould of the stereotypical Republican hero", but it remains "simplistic" and "shallow".

While Kelly evoked Irish nationalist grievances and promoted violent resistance to English rule in the colonies, Morrissey notes that he did not outline a formal political programme, only a broad vision of local autonomy and social justice. Seal interprets this as "a rebalancing of the social and economic system of the region": squatter profits would be redistributed to the poor, who, in turn, would form a community guard, rendering the police unnecessary. Morrissey concludes that Kelly was chiefly motivated by personal vengeance and a desire to consolidate power through violence, and that although he envisaged "a new order in his part of the world", calling it a republic is debatable.

Kelly has sometimes been portrayed as a Fenian martyr, though he had no known ties to the movement. Communist activist Ted Hill states that in the decades after Kelly's execution, he came to embody a "democratic rebellious spirit" for sections of Australia's working class and left-wing intelligentsia. Historian Audrey Oldfield notes that, within these circles, Kelly was also cast as an heir to the Eureka rebels, forming a hybrid symbol of Australian anti-authoritarianism. More recently, some far-right groups have appropriated Kelly as a symbol of the historical "White Australia" ideology.

== See also ==
- List of people on the postage stamps of Ireland
- Steph Ryan, the former member for Euroa, is a distant relative of Ned Kelly.

== Bibliography ==
- Baron, Angeline; White, David (2004). Blood in the Dust: Inside the Minds of Ned Kelly and Joe Byrne. Network Creative Services Pty Ltd. ISBN 978-0-9580162-5-4.
- Basu, Laura (2012). Ned Kelly as Memory Dispositif: Media, Time, Power, and the Development of Australian Identities. Walter de Gruyter. ISBN 978-3-11-028879-7.
- Brown, Max (2005). Australian Son: The Story of Ned Kelly. Network Creative Services Pty Ltd. ISBN 978-0-9580162-6-1.
- Castles, Alex C. (2005). Ned Kelly's Last Days: Setting the Record Straight on the Death of an Outlaw. Allen & Unwin. ISBN 978-1-74115-914-1.
- Corfield, Justin (2003). The Ned Kelly Encyclopaedia. Lothian Books. ISBN 0-7344-0596-0.
- Cormick, Craig (2014). Ned Kelly: Under the Microscope. CSIRO Publishing. ISBN 978-1-4863-0178-2.
- Dawson, Stuart (2015). "Redeeming Fitzpatrick: Ned Kelly and the Fitzpatrick Incident" (PDF). Eras Journal. 17 (1): 60–91. Archived from the original (PDF) on 25 March 2025.
- Dawson, Stuart (2016). "Ned Kelly's last words: 'Ah, well, I suppose'" (PDF). Eras. 18 (1): 38–50. Archived from the original (PDF) on 24 December 2016.
- Dawson, Stuart (2018). Ned Kelly and the Myth of a Republic of North-Eastern Victoria. ISBN 978-1-64316-500-4.
- Dunstan, Keith (1980). Saint Ned: The Story of the Near Sanctification of an Australian Outlaw. Methuen Australia. ISBN 978-0-454-00198-3.
- Farwell, George (1970). Ned Kelly: The Life and Adventures of Australia's Notorious Bushranger. Cheshire. ISBN 978-0-7015-1319-1.
- FitzSimons, Peter (2013). Ned Kelly. Random House Australia. ISBN 978-1-74275-890-9.
- Gaunson, Stephen (2013). "Protesting Colonial Australia: Convict Theatre and Kelly Ballads". In Friedman, Jonathan C. (ed.). The Routledge History of Social Protest in Popular Music. Taylor & Francis. pp. 361–372. ISBN 9781136447297.
- Innes, Lyn (2008). Ned Kelly: Icon of Modern Culture. Helm Information Ltd. ISBN 978-1-903206-16-4.
- Jones, Ian (1992). The Friendship that Destroyed Ned Kelly: Joe Byrne Joe Byrne & Aaron Sherritt. Lothian Pub. ISBN 9780850915181.
- Jones, Ian (1995). Ned Kelly, a short life. Port Melbourne: Lothian Books. ISBN 0-85091-631-3.
- Jones, Ian (2010). Ned Kelly: A Short Life. Hachette UK. ISBN 978-0-7336-2579-4.
- Kelly, Ned (2012). McDermott, Alex (ed.). The Jerilderie Letter: Text Classics. Text Publishing. ISBN 978-1-921922-33-6.
- Kelson, Brendon; McQuilton, John (2001). Kelly Country: A Photographic Journey. University of Queensland Press. ISBN 978-0-7022-3273-2.
- Kenneally, J.J. (1929). Inner History of the Kelly Gang. Dandenong, Victoria: The Kelly Gang Publishing Company.
- Kieza, Grantlee (2017). Mrs Kelly. HarperCollins Australia. ISBN 978-1-74309-717-5.
- Macfarlane, Ian (2012). The Kelly Gang Unmasked. South Melbourne: Oxford University Press. ISBN 978-0-19-551966-2.
- McMenomy, Keith (1984). Ned Kelly: The Authentic Illustrated History. C. O. Ross. ISBN 978-0-85902-122-7.
- McQuilton, John (1987). The Kelly Outbreak, 1878–1880. Carlton: Melbourne University Press. ISBN 0-522-84332-8.
- Meredith, John; Scott, Bill (1980). Ned Kelly: After a Century of Acrimony. Lansdowne Press. ISBN 978-0-7018-1470-0.
- Molony, John (2001). Ned Kelly. Melbourne University Publishing. ISBN 978-0-522-85013-0.
- Morrissey, Doug (2015). Ned Kelly, a Lawless Life. Ballarat: Connor Court. ISBN 978-1-925138-48-1.
- Phillips, John Harber (1987). The Trial of Ned Kelly. ISBN 9780455207599.
- Seal, Graham (1980). Ned Kelly in Popular Tradition. Melbourne: Hyland House. ISBN 0-908090-32-3.
- Seal, Graham (2002). Tell 'em I Died Game: The Legend of Ned Kelly. Hyland House Pub. ISBN 978-1-86447-047-5.
- Seal, Graham (2011). Outlaw Heroes in Myth and History. Anthem Press. ISBN 978-0-85728-792-2.
- Shaw, Ian W. (2012). Glenrowan. Hyland House Pub. ISBN 978-1-86447-047-5.
- Terry, Paul (2012). The True Story of Ned Kelly's Last Stand. Pan Macmillan Australia. ISBN 9781743345566.
