= Yandy =

Yandy is a given name. Notable people with the name include:

- Yandy Díaz (born 1991), Cuban baseball player
- Yandy Laurens (born 1989), Indonesian filmmaker
- Yandy Smith-Harris, a Love & Hip Hop: New York cast member

== See also ==
- Yandy.com
