= Stained glass windows by Harry Clarke =

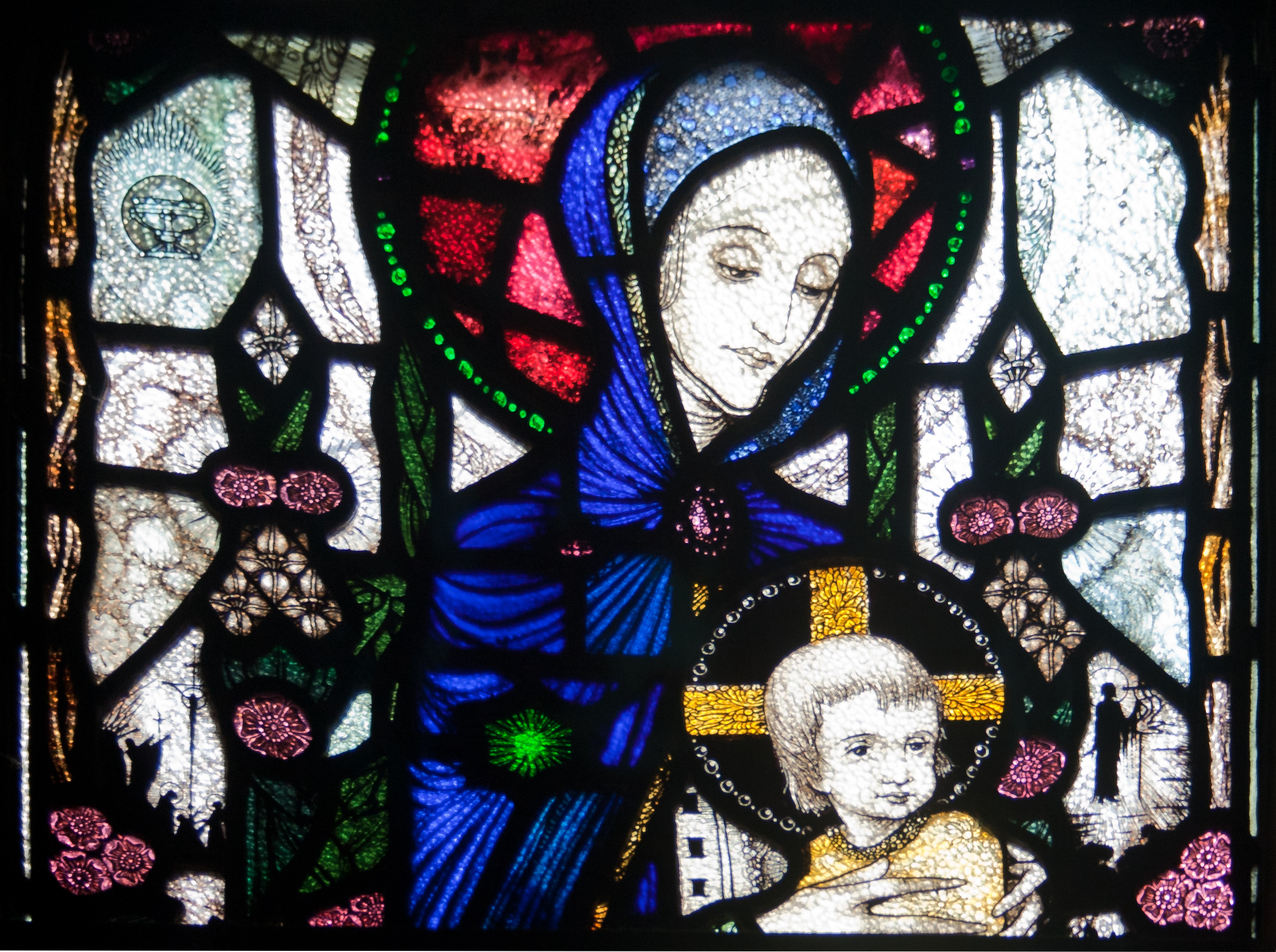
Detail of Madonna and Child at Church of the Assumption, Bride Street, Wexford, Ireland

Harry Clarke (1889–1931) was an Irish stained-glass artist and book illustrator. He produced more than 130 stained glass windows, he and his brother Walter having taken over his father's studio after his death in 1921. His glass is distinguished by the finesse of its drawing and his use of rich colours, and an innovative integration of the window leading as part of the overall design, originally inspired by an early visit to see the stained glass of the Cathedral of Chartres. He was especially fond of deep blues. Clarke's use of heavy lines in his black-and-white book illustrations echoes his glass techniques.

Clarke's work includes both religious and secular stained glass windows. Highlights of the former include the windows of the Honan Chapel in University College Cork; of the latter, a window illustrating John Keats' The Eve of St. Agnes (now in the Hugh Lane Municipal Gallery in Dublin) and the Geneva Window (now in the Wolfsonian Museum, Miami, Florida, USA). Perhaps his most seen works were the windows he made for Bewley's Café on Dublin's Grafton Street.

== List of leaded glass windows (by Harry Clarke) ==
Building	Location	Year	Details	Notes	Images
Crawford Art Gallery	(Republic of Ireland) Cork	1910	The Consecration of St. Mel, Bishop of Longford	Awarded a gold medal at the 1911 National Competition in South Kensington.	
Crawford Art Gallery	(Republic of Ireland) Cork	1911	The Godhead Enthroned	Awarded a gold medal at the 1911 National Competition in South Kensington.	
Crawford Art Gallery	(Republic of Ireland) Cork	1911	The Meeting of St. Brendan with the Unhappy Judas	Awarded a gold medal at the 1911 National Competition in South Kensington.	
National College of Art and Design	(Republic of Ireland) Dublin 8	1912	The Baptism of St. Patrick	Part of six panels designed for the 1912 National Competition in South Kensington while Clarke was a student at the Dublin Metropolitan School of Art. Clarke won a gold medal in the competition, as well as first prize in the annual Royal Dublin Society's 1913 Art Industries Exhibition.	
National Museum of Ireland – Decorative Arts and History	(Republic of Ireland) Dublin 7	1912	The Unhappy Judas	Won a Gold Medal at the 1913 National Competition in South Kensington, as well as first prize in the annual Royal Dublin Society's 1913 Art Industries Exhibition. Acquired by the museum in 2008.	
National Museum of Ireland – Decorative Arts and History	(Republic of Ireland) Dublin 7	1918	A Meeting	Inspired by a ballad written by Heinrich Heine.	
Honan Chapel, University College Cork	(Republic of Ireland) Cork	1915	St. Brigid	Described by critic Brian Fallon as "one of the central masterpieces of twentieth-century Irish art", describing the windows as "... hieratic, Byzantine, and so powerful and original in colour that it is hard if not impossible to think of any European equivalent to them since the Middle Ages."	
Honan Chapel, University College Cork	(Republic of Ireland) Cork	1915	St. Patrick	Described by critic Brian Fallon as "one of the central masterpieces of twentieth-century Irish art", describing the windows as "... hieratic, Byzantine, and so powerful and original in colour that it is hard if not impossible to think of any European equivalent to them since the Middle Ages."	
Honan Chapel, University College Cork	(Republic of Ireland) Cork	1915	St. Colmcille	Described by critic Brian Fallon as "one of the central masterpieces of twentieth-century Irish art", describing the windows as "... hieratic, Byzantine, and so powerful and original in colour that it is hard if not impossible to think of any European equivalent to them since the Middle Ages."	
Honan Chapel, University College Cork	(Republic of Ireland) Cork	1916	St. Finnbarr	Described by critic Brian Fallon as "one of the central masterpieces of twentieth-century Irish art", describing the windows as "... hieratic, Byzantine, and so powerful and original in colour that it is hard if not impossible to think of any European equivalent to them since the Middle Ages."	
Honan Chapel, University College Cork	(Republic of Ireland) Cork	1916	St. Ita	Described by critic Brian Fallon as "one of the central masterpieces of twentieth-century Irish art", describing the windows as "... hieratic, Byzantine, and so powerful and original in colour that it is hard if not impossible to think of any European equivalent to them since the Middle Ages."	
Honan Chapel, University College Cork	(Republic of Ireland) Cork	1916	St. Albert	Described by critic Brian Fallon as "one of the central masterpieces of twentieth-century Irish art", describing the windows as "... hieratic, Byzantine, and so powerful and original in colour that it is hard if not impossible to think of any European equivalent to them since the Middle Ages."	
Honan Chapel, University College Cork	(Republic of Ireland) Cork	1916	St. Gobnait	Described by critic Brian Fallon as "one of the central masterpieces of twentieth-century Irish art", describing the windows as "... hieratic, Byzantine, and so powerful and original in colour that it is hard if not impossible to think of any European equivalent to them since the Middle Ages."	
Honan Chapel, University College Cork	(Republic of Ireland) Cork	1916	St. Brendan	Described by critic Brian Fallon as "one of the central masterpieces of twentieth-century Irish art", describing the windows as "... hieratic, Byzantine, and so powerful and original in colour that it is hard if not impossible to think of any European equivalent to them since the Middle Ages."	
Honan Chapel, University College Cork	(Republic of Ireland) Cork	1916	St. Declan	Described by critic Brian Fallon as "one of the central masterpieces of twentieth-century Irish art", describing the windows as "... hieratic, Byzantine, and so powerful and original in colour that it is hard if not impossible to think of any European equivalent to them since the Middle Ages."	
Honan Chapel, University College Cork	(Republic of Ireland) Cork	1916	St. Joseph	Described by critic Brian Fallon as "one of the central masterpieces of twentieth-century Irish art", describing the windows as "... hieratic, Byzantine, and so powerful and original in colour that it is hard if not impossible to think of any European equivalent to them since the Middle Ages."	
Honan Chapel, University College Cork	(Republic of Ireland) Cork	1917	Our Lady of Sorrows	Described by critic Brian Fallon as "one of the central masterpieces of twentieth-century Irish art", describing the windows as "... hieratic, Byzantine, and so powerful and original in colour that it is hard if not impossible to think of any European equivalent to them since the Middle Ages."	
National Gallery of Ireland	(Republic of Ireland) Dublin 2	1917	The Song of the Mad Prince	After the 1913 poem by Walter de la Mare. Housed in a James Hicks cabinet and originally made for Clarke's patron Thomas Bodkin. Acquired by the gallery in 1987.	
National Gallery of Ireland	(Republic of Ireland) Dublin 2	1922	Titania Enchanting Bottom	Depicts Act IV, Scene I of Shakespeare's A Midsummer Night's Dream and mounted in a James Hicks cabinet. Acquired by the gallery in 2023 at auction for US$47,880.	
National Gallery of Ireland	(Republic of Ireland) Dublin 2	1926	The Mother of Sorrows	Acquired in 2002 from the Convent of Notre Dame at Dowanhill in Glasgow, Scotland.	
Private Collection formerly Marino (Abbey Lea)	(Republic of Ireland) Killiney, Co. Dublin	1917	Queens of Sheba, Meath and Connaught	Nine frieze windows based on J. M. Synge's poem "Queens". The windows were commissioned by Laurence Ambrose Waldron for his house, Marino, which later became known as Abbey Lea and served as the Australian ambassador's residence. They sold at auction for UK£331,500 in 1997.	
Private Collection formerly Marino (Abbey Lea)	(Republic of Ireland) Killiney, Co. Dublin	1917	Queens men drew like Monna Lisa	Nine frieze windows based on J. M. Synge's poem "Queens". The windows were commissioned by Laurence Ambrose Waldron for his house, Marino, which later became known as Abbey Lea and served as the Australian ambassador's residence. They sold at auction for UK£331,500 in 1997.	
Private Collection formerly Marino (Abbey Lea)	(Republic of Ireland) Killiney, Co. Dublin	1917	Lucrenzia Crivelli	Nine frieze windows based on J. M. Synge's poem "Queens". The windows were commissioned by Laurence Ambrose Waldron for his house, Marino, which later became known as Abbey Lea and served as the Australian ambassador's residence. They sold at auction for UK£331,500 in 1997.	
Private Collection formerly Marino (Abbey Lea)	(Republic of Ireland) Killiney, Co. Dublin	1917	Queens in Glenmacnass	Nine frieze windows based on J. M. Synge's poem "Queens". The windows were commissioned by Laurence Ambrose Waldron for his house, Marino, which later became known as Abbey Lea and served as the Australian ambassador's residence. They sold at auction for UK£331,500 in 1997.	
Private Collection formerly Marino (Abbey Lea)	(Republic of Ireland) Killiney, Co. Dublin	1917	Etain, Helen, Maeve, and Fand	Nine frieze windows based on J. M. Synge's poem "Queens". The windows were commissioned by Laurence Ambrose Waldron for his house, Marino, which later became known as Abbey Lea and served as the Australian ambassador's residence. They sold at auction for UK£331,500 in 1997.	
Private Collection formerly Marino (Abbey Lea)	(Republic of Ireland) Killiney, Co. Dublin	1917	Bert	Nine frieze windows based on J. M. Synge's poem "Queens". The windows were commissioned by Laurence Ambrose Waldron for his house, Marino, which later became known as Abbey Lea and served as the Australian ambassador's residence. They sold at auction for UK£331,500 in 1997.	
Private Collection formerly Marino (Abbey Lea)	(Republic of Ireland) Killiney, Co. Dublin	1917	Queens who cut the bogs of Glanna	Nine frieze windows based on J. M. Synge's poem "Queens". The windows were commissioned by Laurence Ambrose Waldron for his house, Marino, which later became known as Abbey Lea and served as the Australian ambassador's residence. They sold at auction for UK£331,500 in 1997.	
Private Collection formerly Marino (Abbey Lea)	(Republic of Ireland) Killiney, Co. Dublin	1917	Queens who wasted the East by proxy	Nine frieze windows based on J. M. Synge's poem "Queens". The windows were commissioned by Laurence Ambrose Waldron for his house, Marino, which later became known as Abbey Lea and served as the Australian ambassador's residence. They sold at auction for UK£331,500 in 1997.	
Private Collection formerly Marino (Abbey Lea)	(Republic of Ireland) Killiney, Co. Dublin	1917	Queen of all are living or have been	Nine frieze windows based on J. M. Synge's poem "Queens". The windows were commissioned by Laurence Ambrose Waldron for his house, Marino, which later became known as Abbey Lea and served as the Australian ambassador's residence. They sold at auction for UK£331,500 in 1997.	
Private Collection formerly Marino (Abbey Lea)	(Republic of Ireland) Killiney, Co. Dublin	1918	Waldron Family Crest	Two small panels designed for Clarke's friend and patron Laurence Ambrose Waldron	
Private Collection formerly Marino (Abbey Lea)	(Republic of Ireland) Killiney, Co. Dublin	1918	The Sun	Two small panels designed for Clarke's friend and patron Laurence Ambrose Waldron	
St. Barrahane's Church	(Republic of Ireland) Castletownshend, Co. Cork	1918	The Nativity with the Adoration of the Kings and the Shepherds	In memory of Thomas Somerville and his wife, Henrietta Townsend of Drishane House. The tracery lights depict Sts. Brigid, Fachtna, and Barrahane.	
St. Barrahane's Church	(Republic of Ireland) Castletownshend, Co. Cork	1920	St. Louis IX, King of France	In memory of Kendall Coghill, who died during the Indian Rebellion of 1857.	
St. Barrahane's Church	(Republic of Ireland) Castletownshend, Co. Cork	1920	St. Martin of Tours dividing his Cloak for a Beggar	In memory of Kendall Coghill, who died during the Indian Rebellion of 1857.	
St. Barrahane's Church	(Republic of Ireland) Castletownshend, Co. Cork	1926	St. Luke attended by Sts. Cecelia, Barrahane, and Fidelis	In memory of Sir Egerton Coghill.	
Church of the Assumption, Bride Street	(Republic of Ireland) Wexford, Co. Wexford	1919	Madonna and Child	Together known as the "O'Keefe Memorial Window" after Lieutenant Henry O'Keefe. It was commissioned by his mother after O'Keefe died in France in May 1917 during World War I. Second window also described as Sts. Aiden and Breen	
Church of the Assumption, Bride Street	(Republic of Ireland) Wexford, Co. Wexford	1919	Adored by Sts. Adrian and Aiden	Together known as the "O'Keefe Memorial Window" after Lieutenant Henry O'Keefe. It was commissioned by his mother after O'Keefe died in France in May 1917 during World War I. Second window also described as Sts. Aiden and Breen	
Holy Trinity Church	(Republic of Ireland) Killiney, Co. Dublin	1919	Angel of Hope and Peace	In memory of Clifford B. Lloyd, who was killed during World War I.	
Clontarf & Scots Presbyterian Church	(Republic of Ireland) Clontarf, Co. Dublin	1920	1914 – 1918 Great War Memorial Window	Commemorating 14 members of the church who had laid down their lives in the Great War 1914 – 1918. The window was commissioned for £539 on 11/09/1920. Currently (2026) under going renovations at Connon Stained Glass. Read more https://clontarfchurch.ie/harry-clarke-memorial-window/	
Vincentian Fathers Church of St. Peter	(Republic of Ireland) Phibsborough, Dublin 7	1919	Adoration of the Sacred Heart	Incorporated into the church's Chapel of Adoration.	
Vincentian Fathers Church of St. Peter	(Republic of Ireland) Phibsborough, Dublin 7	1919	St. Margaret Mary	Incorporated into the church's Chapel of Adoration.	
Vincentian Fathers Church of St. Peter	(Republic of Ireland) Phibsborough, Dublin 7	1919	St. John Eudes	Incorporated into the church's Chapel of Adoration.	
Vincentian Fathers Church of St. Peter	(Republic of Ireland) Phibsborough, Dublin 7	1924	Four Decorative Windows	In the Mortuary Chapel. Collages made of cullet and incorporating symbols of the passion of Christ.	
St. Mary's Church	(England) Nantwich, Cheshire	1920	Madonna and Child	The quatrefoil and trefoil windows above the main window include St. Adria, St. Clare, St. Francis of Assisi, Mary Magdalen, St. Brigid, and St. Nicholas	
St. Mary's Church	(England) Nantwich, Cheshire	1920	St. Cecelia	The quatrefoil and trefoil windows above the main window include St. Adria, St. Clare, St. Francis of Assisi, Mary Magdalen, St. Brigid, and St. Nicholas	
St. Mary's Church	(England) Nantwich, Cheshire	1920	Richard Cœur de Lion	The quatrefoil and trefoil windows above the main window include St. Adria, St. Clare, St. Francis of Assisi, Mary Magdalen, St. Brigid, and St. Nicholas	
Brian Clarke Collection of Stained Glass	(England) London	1921	Bluebeard's Last Wife	Panel mounted in a James Hicks cabinet. Acquired at auction in 2021 for €165,000.	
St. Mary's Church	(England) Sturminster Newton, Dorset	1921	Our Lady and child	Tracery lights above the window contain a quatrefoil of the St. George cross and four angels	
St. Mary's Church	(England) Sturminster Newton, Dorset	1921	St. Elizabeth of Hungary	Tracery lights above the window contain a quatrefoil of the St. George cross and four angels	
St. Mary's Church	(England) Sturminster Newton, Dorset	1921	St. Barbara	Tracery lights above the window contain a quatrefoil of the St. George cross and four angels	
Christ Church	(Republic of Ireland) Gorey, Co. Wexford	1922	St. Stephen	In memory of Percival Lea-Wilson. A 1920 Joshua Clarke & Sons window in the church is also dedicated to Lea-Wilson.	
Christ Church	(Republic of Ireland) Gorey, Co. Wexford	1923	St. Martin of Tours		
Christ Church	(Republic of Ireland) Gorey, Co. Wexford	1923	St. Luke		
Christ Church	(Republic of Ireland) Gorey, Co. Wexford	1923	Rose Window	Designed by Clarke but completed by Harry Clarke Studio.	
St. John the Evangelist	(England) Gilford, Co. Down	1922	Catherine of Siena	Clarke authorship confirmed by Dr. Nicola Gordon Bowe.	
St. John the Evangelist	(England) Gilford, Co. Down	1929	Madonna of Lourdes	Clarke authorship confirmed by Dr. Nicola Gordon Bowe.	
Hugh Lane Gallery	(Republic of Ireland) Dublin 1	1923	The Eve of St. Agnes	Illustration of John Keats's poem of the same name. Across two panels, the window includes 14 scenes from the poem, along with two semi-circular decorative panels at the top and a frieze below. Excerpts from the poem label each of the scenes. Originally created for George N. Jacob's home on Ailesbury Road in Dublin, James Hicks built wooden slips to hold the window. After Jacob's death, his son, Harold, moved the windows to his house in Foxrock, Co. Dublin. In 1949, the panels were acquired by Richard King and placed into storage until they were acquired in the late 1970s by the Hugh Lane Gallery for IR£20,000.	
Hugh Lane Gallery	(Republic of Ireland) Dublin 1	1930	Mr. Gilhooley	Based on a work of the same name by Liam O'Flaherty. It is the original panel from the Geneva Window, but a second panel was made due to a crack in the figure's neck. It was acquired by the gallery in 2015 from the Fine Art Society, London, for UK£35,000.	
Church of St. Peter & St. Paul	(Republic of Ireland) Balbriggan, Co. Dublin	1924	The Visitation	Commissioned in 1923 by Canon Byrne of Balbriggan and completed for a cost of IR£116. The Widow's Son depicts the raising of the son of the widow of Nain from the Gospel of Luke.	
Church of St. Peter & St. Paul	(Republic of Ireland) Balbriggan, Co. Dublin	1924	The Widow's Son	Commissioned in 1923 by Canon Byrne of Balbriggan and completed for a cost of IR£116. The Widow's Son depicts the raising of the son of the widow of Nain from the Gospel of Luke.	
St. Joseph's Church	(Republic of Ireland) Terenure, Dublin 6	1922	The Annunciation		
St. Joseph's Church	(Republic of Ireland) Terenure, Dublin 6	1923	Our Lady Queen of Heaven	Described as 'Adoration of the Cross'	
St. Stephens Cathedral	(Australia) Brisbane, Queensland	1923	The Ascension	Commissioned by Archbishop Sir James Duhig. Inscribed to the memory of Isaac and William Mayne.	
Kelvingrove Art Gallery and Museum	(Scotland) Glasgow	1932	The Coronation of the Blessed Virgin	Originally made for the Convent of Notre Dame at Dowanhill in Glasgow, Scotland. Purchased by Glasgow Museums in 2002 for UK£132,000.	
Chapel of the Sacred Heart	(Republic of Ireland) Dingle, Co. Kerry	1924	The Visit of the Magi	The 12 windows cover six scenes from the life of Jesus. The chapel is now under the ownership of the Díseart Centre of Irish Spirituality and Culture.	
Chapel of the Sacred Heart	(Republic of Ireland) Dingle, Co. Kerry	1924	The Baptism of Jesus	The 12 windows cover six scenes from the life of Jesus. The chapel is now under the ownership of the Díseart Centre of Irish Spirituality and Culture.	
Chapel of the Sacred Heart	(Republic of Ireland) Dingle, Co. Kerry	1924	Let the little children come to me	The 12 windows cover six scenes from the life of Jesus. The chapel is now under the ownership of the Díseart Centre of Irish Spirituality and Culture.	
Chapel of the Sacred Heart	(Republic of Ireland) Dingle, Co. Kerry	1924	The Sermon on the Mount	The 12 windows cover six scenes from the life of Jesus. The chapel is now under the ownership of the Díseart Centre of Irish Spirituality and Culture.	
Chapel of the Sacred Heart	(Republic of Ireland) Dingle, Co. Kerry	1924	The Agony in the Garden	The 12 windows cover six scenes from the life of Jesus. The chapel is now under the ownership of the Díseart Centre of Irish Spirituality and Culture.	
Chapel of the Sacred Heart	(Republic of Ireland) Dingle, Co. Kerry	1924	Jesus appears to Mary Magdalene	The 12 windows cover six scenes from the life of Jesus. The chapel is now under the ownership of the Díseart Centre of Irish Spirituality and Culture.	
Church of the Sacred Heart, Donnybrook	(Republic of Ireland) Donnybrook, Dublin 4	1924	St. Rita	The Clarke panels flank a third light, Sorrowful Mother of Christ, by William McBride.	
Church of the Sacred Heart, Donnybrook	(Republic of Ireland) Donnybrook, Dublin 4	1924	St. Bernard of Clairvaux	The Clarke panels flank a third light, Sorrowful Mother of Christ, by William McBride.	
Eneriley and Kilbride Church of Ireland	(Republic of Ireland) Arklow, Co. Wicklow	1924	Resurrection window	Clarke is also credited with a small, abstract window in the North transept over the door.	
St. Mary's Roman Catholic Church	(Isle of Man) Castletown	1924	The Annunciation	Variously attributed to Clarke and to the Clarke Brothers.	
St. Mary's Roman Catholic Church	(Isle of Man) Castletown	1924	The Resurrection	Variously attributed to Clarke and to the Clarke Brothers.	
St. MacCullin's Parish Church	(Republic of Ireland) Lusk, Co. Dublin	1924	Dempsey Memorial Lancet Window of St. Maculind	The artist's self-portrait among the afflicted	
St. Michael and St. John	(Republic of Ireland) Cloughjordan, Co. Tipperary	1924	The Ascension with five Irish saints and St. Michael and St. James		
Chapel of the Novitiate of the Oblate Fathers of St. Mary Immaculate, Belcamp College	(Republic of Ireland) Balgriffin, Dublin 17	1925	St. Brendan at the helm of his boat		
Chapel of the Novitiate of the Oblate Fathers of St. Mary Immaculate, Belcamp College	(Republic of Ireland) Balgriffin, Dublin 17	1925	St. Malachy	Also known as St. Maol M'Aodhog	
Chapel of the Novitiate of the Oblate Fathers of St. Mary Immaculate, Belcamp College	(Republic of Ireland) Balgriffin, Dublin 17	1925	St. Kevin in his cave at Glendalough		
Chapel of the Novitiate of the Oblate Fathers of St. Mary Immaculate, Belcamp College	(Republic of Ireland) Balgriffin, Dublin 17	1925	St. Laurence O'Toole in the ancient city of Dublin	Also known as Lorcon	
Chapel of the Novitiate of the Oblate Fathers of St. Mary Immaculate, Belcamp College	(Republic of Ireland) Balgriffin, Dublin 17	1925	St. Colmcille		
Chapel of the Novitiate of the Oblate Fathers of St. Mary Immaculate, Belcamp College	(Republic of Ireland) Balgriffin, Dublin 17	1925	St. Duileach		
Chapel of the Novitiate of the Oblate Fathers of St. Mary Immaculate, Belcamp College	(Republic of Ireland) Balgriffin, Dublin 17	1925	St. Damhnait		
Chapel of the Novitiate of the Oblate Fathers of St. Mary Immaculate, Belcamp College	(Republic of Ireland) Balgriffin, Dublin 17	1925	St. Brigid		
Chapel of the Novitiate of the Oblate Fathers of St. Mary Immaculate, Belcamp College	(Republic of Ireland) Balgriffin, Dublin 17	1925	St. Eithne and St. Fedhlim		
Chapel of the Novitiate of the Oblate Fathers of St. Mary Immaculate, Belcamp College	(Republic of Ireland) Balgriffin, Dublin 17	1925	St. Gobnait		
Chapel of the Novitiate of the Oblate Fathers of St. Mary Immaculate, Belcamp College	(Republic of Ireland) Balgriffin, Dublin 17	1925	St. Patrick		
Chapel of the Novitiate of the Oblate Fathers of St. Mary Immaculate, Belcamp College	(Republic of Ireland) Balgriffin, Dublin 17	1925	St. Oliver Plunkett		
Richard Townley Suite, Ashdown Park Hotel	(England) Wych Cross, East Sussex	1925	Scenes from the life of Mary	The eight windows were designed for the chancel of the Chapel of Our Lady at the Convent of Notre Dame. The deconsecrated chapel is now the hotel's Richard Townley Suite.	
St. John the Baptist Church Duhill	(Republic of Ireland) Castlegrace, Co. Tipperary	1925	Salomé receiving the head of John the Baptist	The windows memorialise Margaret Byrne of Ashgrove and her brothers: Rev. John Moran of Ballyduff, Rev. Thomas Moran of Newcastle and James Moran of Ballyknockane.	
St. John the Baptist Church Duhill	(Republic of Ireland) Castlegrace, Co. Tipperary	1925	The Apparition at Lourdes	The windows memorialise Margaret Byrne of Ashgrove and her brothers: Rev. John Moran of Ballyduff, Rev. Thomas Moran of Newcastle and James Moran of Ballyknockane.	
St. Michael's Catholic Church	(Republic of Ireland) Ballinasloe, Co. Galway	1925	Sts. Patrick and Rose of Lima	Clarke also designed a mural, Our Lady, St. John and two angels attending the Trinity (1924), for the church.	
St. Joseph's Church	(Republic of Ireland) Carrickmacross, Co. Monaghan	1925	St. Ceara	Designed and partially constructed by Clarke.	
St. Joseph's Church	(Republic of Ireland) Carrickmacross, Co. Monaghan	1925	St. Dympna	Harry Clarke Studio under supervision by Clarke. Additional Harry Clarke Studio windows are present in the church, too.	
St. Joseph's Church	(Republic of Ireland) Carrickmacross, Co. Monaghan	1925	Sts. Macartan and Tigernach	Harry Clarke Studio under supervision by Clarke. Additional Harry Clarke Studio windows are present in the church, too.	
St. Joseph's Church	(Republic of Ireland) Carrickmacross, Co. Monaghan	1925	Sts. Fachnea and Enda	Harry Clarke Studio under supervision by Clarke. Additional Harry Clarke Studio windows are present in the church, too.	
Chapel of the Noel Family	(England) Exton Park, Rutland	1926	Blessed Oliver Plunkett and Blessed Thomas More		
St. Mary's Church	(Republic of Ireland) Ballinrobe, Co. Mayo	1926	St. Fursey and St. Fechin		
St. Mary's Church	(Republic of Ireland) Ballinrobe, Co. Mayo	1926	St. Colman and St. Brendan		
St. Mary's Church	(Republic of Ireland) Ballinrobe, Co. Mayo	1926	St. Gormgall and St. Kieran		
St. Mary's Church	(Republic of Ireland) Ballinrobe, Co. Mayo	1926	St. Enda and St. Jarleth		
St. Mary's Church	(Republic of Ireland) Ballinrobe, Co. Mayo	1926	Assumption and Coronation of Blessed Virgin Mary		
St. Mary's Church	(Republic of Ireland) Ballinrobe, Co. Mayo	1926	Presentation in the Temple and Immaculate Conception		
St. Mary's Church	(Republic of Ireland) Ballinrobe, Co. Mayo	1926	Ecce Homo and Magdalen in the Garden		
St. Mary's Church	(Republic of Ireland) Ballinrobe, Co. Mayo	1926	Baptism of Christ and Ascension		
St. Mary's Church	(Republic of Ireland) Ballinrobe, Co. Mayo	1926	St. Patrick, St. Brigid and St. Colmcille		
St. Patrick's Church	(Republic of Ireland) Donabate, Co. Dublin	1926	Suffer little Children to come unto me		
Dominican Convent Chapel	(Northern Ireland) Belfast	1927	Rose Window		
Killaloe Church	(Republic of Ireland) Killaloe, Co. Clare	1927	The Presentation of Our Lord		
Killaloe Church	(Republic of Ireland) Killaloe, Co. Clare	1927	Annunciation and Flight into Egypt		
St. Patrick's at Carnalway	(Republic of Ireland) Kilcullen, Co. Kildare	1922	St. Hubert	Commissioned by George A. Birmingham in memory of Percy and Lady Annette La Touche. In 2006, An Post used an image of the window on its stamp marking the 75th anniversary of Clarke's death.	
Sandford Road Church	(Republic of Ireland) Ranelagh, Dublin 6	1927	St. Paul with the Conversion of St. Paul in predella	The head of St. Peter is not original.	
Sandford Road Church	(Republic of Ireland) Ranelagh, Dublin 6	1927	St. Peter with St. Peter's Denial in predella	The head of St. Peter is not original.	
St. Patrick's Church	(Republic of Ireland) Newport, Co. Mayo	1927	Last Judgement		
The Stained Glass Museum, Ely Cathedral	(England) Ely, Cambridgeshire	1927	St. Wilfred and St. John Berchmans with the Presentation of our Lady in the Temple in lower panel	Originally made for the Convent of Notre Dame at Dowanhill in Glasgow, Scotland. Acquired by the museum in 1998.	
Christ the King Church Tullycross	(Republic of Ireland) Renvyle, Co. Galway	1927	St. Bernard	Purported to have been commissioned by Oliver St. John Gogarty.	
Christ the King Church Tullycross	(Republic of Ireland) Renvyle, Co. Galway	1927	St. Barbara	Purported to have been commissioned by Oliver St. John Gogarty.	
Christ the King Church Tullycross	(Republic of Ireland) Renvyle, Co. Galway	1927	Apparition of the Sacred Heart	Purported to have been commissioned by Oliver St. John Gogarty.	
Destroyed during World War II formerly All Saints Church	(Wales) Penarth, Cardiff	1928	The aged Simeon holding the infant Jesus	Both windows were destroyed in 1941 (or possibly as late as 1943) when the church was hit by a German air raid during World War II.	
Destroyed during World War II formerly All Saints Church	(Wales) Penarth, Cardiff	1930	St. Michael and the Giving of the Laws to Moses, with St. Gabriel and the Annunciation	Both windows were destroyed in 1941 (or possibly as late as 1943) when the church was hit by a German air raid during World War II.	
Bewley's Café, 78 Grafton Street	(Republic of Ireland) Dublin 2	1928	Decorative windows		
Our Lady's Hospice	(Republic of Ireland) Harold's Cross, Dublin 6	1928	Sacred Heart	Windows originally designed for Rathfarnham Castle Relocated in 1986.	
Our Lady's Hospice	(Republic of Ireland) Harold's Cross, Dublin 6	1928	St. Joseph and Our Lady	Windows originally designed for Rathfarnham Castle Relocated in 1986.	
St. Brigid's Church of Ireland	(Republic of Ireland) Castleknock, Dublin 15	1928	St. Luke	The three tracery lights depict motifs from the cosmos.	
St. Brigid's Church of Ireland	(Republic of Ireland) Castleknock, Dublin 15	1928	St. George	The three tracery lights depict motifs from the cosmos.	
St. Brigid's Church of Ireland	(Republic of Ireland) Castleknock, Dublin 15	1928	St. Hubert	The three tracery lights depict motifs from the cosmos.	
St. Mary's Church of the Assumption	(Republic of Ireland) Tullamore, Co. Offaly	1928	St. Brendan	Windows originally designed for Rathfarnham Castle Relocated to Tullamore in 1986.	
St. Mary's Church of the Assumption	(Republic of Ireland) Tullamore, Co. Offaly	1928	St. Patrick	Windows originally designed for Rathfarnham Castle Relocated to Tullamore in 1986.	
St. Mary's Church of the Assumption	(Republic of Ireland) Tullamore, Co. Offaly	1928	St. Benignus	Windows originally designed for Rathfarnham Castle Relocated to Tullamore in 1986.	
St. Mary's Church of the Assumption	(Republic of Ireland) Tullamore, Co. Offaly	1928	St. Peter	Windows originally designed for Rathfarnham Castle Relocated to Tullamore in 1986.	
St. Mary's Church of the Assumption	(Republic of Ireland) Tullamore, Co. Offaly	1928	St. Paul	Windows originally designed for Rathfarnham Castle Relocated to Tullamore in 1986.	
St. Mary's Church of the Assumption	(Republic of Ireland) Tullamore, Co. Offaly	1928	St. Ignatius of Loyola	Windows originally designed for Rathfarnham Castle Relocated to Tullamore in 1986.	
St. Mary's Church of the Assumption	(Republic of Ireland) Tullamore, Co. Offaly	1928	Christ's Wounds	Windows originally designed for Rathfarnham Castle Relocated to Tullamore in 1986.	
Cathedral of St. Eunan and St. Columba	(Republic of Ireland) Letterkenny, Co. Donegal	1929	10 clerestory windows		
St. Patrick's Purgatory	(Republic of Ireland) Lough Derg, Co. Donegal	1929	St. Peter	The 14 windows include the Stations of the Cross: 1. Jesus is condemned to death	
St. Patrick's Purgatory	(Republic of Ireland) Lough Derg, Co. Donegal	1929	St. Paul	2. Jesus takes up his cross	
St. Patrick's Purgatory	(Republic of Ireland) Lough Derg, Co. Donegal	1929	Apostle Andrew	3. Jesus falls the first time	
St. Patrick's Purgatory	(Republic of Ireland) Lough Derg, Co. Donegal	1929	Apostle James	4. Jesus Meets His Mother	
St. Patrick's Purgatory	(Republic of Ireland) Lough Derg, Co. Donegal	1929	John the Evangelist	5. Simon helps Jesus to carry the cross	
St. Patrick's Purgatory	(Republic of Ireland) Lough Derg, Co. Donegal	1929	Apostle Philip	6. Veronica wipes the face of Jesus	
St. Patrick's Purgatory	(Republic of Ireland) Lough Derg, Co. Donegal	1929	Apostle Bartholomew	7. Jesus falls the second time	
St. Patrick's Purgatory	(Republic of Ireland) Lough Derg, Co. Donegal	1929	Apostle Thomas (Doubting Thomas)	8. The women of Jerusalem weep for Jesus	
St. Patrick's Purgatory	(Republic of Ireland) Lough Derg, Co. Donegal	1929	Apostle Matthew (Levi)	9. Jesus falls the third time	
St. Patrick's Purgatory	(Republic of Ireland) Lough Derg, Co. Donegal	1929	Apostle James, son of Alphaeus	10. Jesus is stripped of his clothes	
St. Patrick's Purgatory	(Republic of Ireland) Lough Derg, Co. Donegal	1929	St. Jude	11. Jesus is nailed to the cross	
St. Patrick's Purgatory	(Republic of Ireland) Lough Derg, Co. Donegal	1929	Apostle Simon the Zealot	12. Jesus dies on the cross	
St. Patrick's Purgatory	(Republic of Ireland) Lough Derg, Co. Donegal	1929	St. Matthias	13. The body of Jesus is taken from the cross	
St. Patrick's Purgatory	(Republic of Ireland) Lough Derg, Co. Donegal	1929	Mary, Queen of the Apostles	14. The body of Jesus is laid in the tomb	
Everard Memorial Chapel, MIC, St. Patrick's Campus	(Republic of Ireland) Thurles, Co. Tipperary	1929	St. Thomas Aquinas	Commissioned by Very Revd. N Cooke, president of the college at the time, with donations from past presidents. Total cost was IR£436.10	
Everard Memorial Chapel, MIC, St. Patrick's Campus	(Republic of Ireland) Thurles, Co. Tipperary	1929	St. Columkille	Commissioned by Very Revd. N Cooke, president of the college at the time, with donations from past presidents. Total cost was IR£436.10	
Everard Memorial Chapel, MIC, St. Patrick's Campus	(Republic of Ireland) Thurles, Co. Tipperary	1929	St. Columbanus	Commissioned by Very Revd. N Cooke, president of the college at the time, with donations from past presidents. Total cost was IR£436.10	
St. Vincent de Paul Catholic Church	(United States) Bayonne, New Jersey	1929	Angel with Stole	A total of 40 windows were commissioned for the church, and Clarke completed designs and color schemes for the nine chancel windows by October 1928 and installed in 1929. Harry Clark Studios continued to work on the commission after Clarke's death.	
St. Vincent de Paul Catholic Church	(United States) Bayonne, New Jersey	1929	Angel with Cross	A total of 40 windows were commissioned for the church, and Clarke completed designs and color schemes for the nine chancel windows by October 1928 and installed in 1929. Harry Clark Studios continued to work on the commission after Clarke's death.	
St. Vincent de Paul Catholic Church	(United States) Bayonne, New Jersey	1929	Angel with Thurible	A total of 40 windows were commissioned for the church, and Clarke completed designs and color schemes for the nine chancel windows by October 1928 and installed in 1929. Harry Clark Studios continued to work on the commission after Clarke's death.	
St. Vincent de Paul Catholic Church	(United States) Bayonne, New Jersey	1929	Angel with Wine and Watery	A total of 40 windows were commissioned for the church, and Clarke completed designs and color schemes for the nine chancel windows by October 1928 and installed in 1929. Harry Clark Studios continued to work on the commission after Clarke's death.	
St. Vincent de Paul Catholic Church	(United States) Bayonne, New Jersey	1929	Angel with Chasuble	A total of 40 windows were commissioned for the church, and Clarke completed designs and color schemes for the nine chancel windows by October 1928 and installed in 1929. Harry Clark Studios continued to work on the commission after Clarke's death.	
St. Vincent de Paul Catholic Church	(United States) Bayonne, New Jersey	1929	Angel with Maniple	A total of 40 windows were commissioned for the church, and Clarke completed designs and color schemes for the nine chancel windows by October 1928 and installed in 1929. Harry Clark Studios continued to work on the commission after Clarke's death.	
St. Vincent de Paul Catholic Church	(United States) Bayonne, New Jersey	1929	Angel with Candle	A total of 40 windows were commissioned for the church, and Clarke completed designs and color schemes for the nine chancel windows by October 1928 and installed in 1929. Harry Clark Studios continued to work on the commission after Clarke's death.	
St. Vincent de Paul Catholic Church	(United States) Bayonne, New Jersey	1929	Angel with Ciborium	A total of 40 windows were commissioned for the church, and Clarke completed designs and color schemes for the nine chancel windows by October 1928 and installed in 1929. Harry Clark Studios continued to work on the commission after Clarke's death.	
St. Vincent de Paul Catholic Church	(United States) Bayonne, New Jersey	1929	Angel with Book	A total of 40 windows were commissioned for the church, and Clarke completed designs and color schemes for the nine chancel windows by October 1928 and installed in 1929. Harry Clark Studios continued to work on the commission after Clarke's death.	
St. Vincent de Paul Catholic Church	(United States) Bayonne, New Jersey	1929	Angel with Ciborium	A total of 40 windows were commissioned for the church, and Clarke completed designs and color schemes for the nine chancel windows by October 1928 and installed in 1929. Harry Clark Studios continued to work on the commission after Clarke's death.	
St. Michael & All Angels	(England) Waterford, Hertfordshire	1929	St. Cecilia and a Listening Angel	Designed by Clark in 1921, but initially rejected by the church's Diocesan Advisory Committee because it was not in line with the existing windows by Edward Burne-Jones, William Morris, and Ford Madox Brown. Completed in 1929 by Karl Parsons from Clarke's drawings.	
Church of the Nativity of the Blessed Virgin Mary	(Republic of Ireland) Timoleague, Co. Cork	1929–30	Holy Family and Flight into Egypt	Some sources attribute the windows to Clarke himself. The design drawings held at Trinity Library attribute them to Studio artists Cecil Simmonds and William J. Dowling, although Richard King may also have collaborated on them.	
Church of the Nativity of the Blessed Virgin Mary	(Republic of Ireland) Timoleague, Co. Cork	1929–30	Coronation of the Virgin	Some sources attribute the windows to Clarke himself. The design drawings held at Trinity Library attribute them to Studio artists Cecil Simmonds and William J. Dowling, although Richard King may also have collaborated on them.	
Church of the Nativity of the Blessed Virgin Mary	(Republic of Ireland) Timoleague, Co. Cork	1929–30	Assumption	Some sources attribute the windows to Clarke himself. The design drawings held at Trinity Library attribute them to Studio artists Cecil Simmonds and William J. Dowling, although Richard King may also have collaborated on them.	
Church of the Nativity of the Blessed Virgin Mary	(Republic of Ireland) Timoleague, Co. Cork	1929–30	Christ meets his mother	Some sources attribute the windows to Clarke himself. The design drawings held at Trinity Library attribute them to Studio artists Cecil Simmonds and William J. Dowling, although Richard King may also have collaborated on them.	
Church of the Nativity of the Blessed Virgin Mary	(Republic of Ireland) Timoleague, Co. Cork	1929–30	Miracle of Cana	Some sources attribute the windows to Clarke himself. The design drawings held at Trinity Library attribute them to Studio artists Cecil Simmonds and William J. Dowling, although Richard King may also have collaborated on them.	
Church of the Nativity of the Blessed Virgin Mary	(Republic of Ireland) Timoleague, Co. Cork	1929–30	Death of St. Joseph	Some sources attribute the windows to Clarke himself. The design drawings held at Trinity Library attribute them to Studio artists Cecil Simmonds and William J. Dowling, although Richard King may also have collaborated on them.	
Wolfsonian-FIU	(United States) Miami Beach, Florida	1930	Geneva Window	Commissioned by the Irish Free State government for the League of Nations' International Labour Building in Geneva, but rejected for being "too provocative" and "unrepresentative". It was first installed in Government Buildings on Merrion Square before being purchased by Clarke's widow, Margaret, in 1933 for its original cost of IR£450. The window was exhibited at the Hugh Lane Gallery in Dublin and by the Fine Art Society in London before being acquired by Mitchell Wolfson Jr. in 1988.	
Private Collection formerly St. Patrick's Church, Trim	(Republic of Ireland) Trim, Co. Meath	1930	The Ascension	Commissioned by Lady Dillon of Longworth Hall in Hereford in February 1929 for Lismullen Church in Skryne, Co. Meath. In 1964, the window was relocated to the Cathedral Church of St Patrick in Trim, Co. Meath. In 2006, it was purchased at auction by a private collector.	
St. Cuthbert's Catholic Church	(England) Durham, Durham	1931	St. William of York, St. Cuthbert, Blessed Thomas Percy, the English Martyrs, St. Bede	Known as the Canon Brown Window, it was paid for by a parishioners in memory of Canon Brown who served as parish priest from 1887 to 1924. The window underwent a major restoration in 2013 by Iona Art Glass.	
St. Mary’s Church, Killenaule	(Republic of Ireland) Killenaule, Co. Tipperary	post-1930	Assumption of the Blessed Virgin Mary	The window is located over the main entrance of the church. It was commissioned and erected by Canon Edmond Kelly.	
