= Cill Náile =

Cill Náile is the Irish name of two places:

- Kinawley, County Fermanagh, Northern Ireland, a small village
- Killenaule, County Tipperary, Republic of Ireland, a small town
