= Edmund Quirke =

Irish Civil War casualty (1912–1923)

- Born: Edmond Quirke; 27 April 1912; Ashgrove, Bansha, County Tipperary, Ireland
- Died: 18 February 1923 (aged 10); Ashgrove, Bansha, County Tipperary, Irish Free State
- Relatives: James Quirke (father); Anne Quirke, née Kelly (mother)
- Military career
- Allegiance: Anti-Treaty IRA
- Branch: Irish Republican Army
- Rank: Despatch carrier
- Units: Bansha Company, Third Tipperary Brigade (South Tipperary Brigade)
- Conflicts: Irish Civil War

Edmund Quirke (27 April 1912 – 18 February 1923), also recorded in official files as Edmond Quirke, was an Irish boy killed at his family's farmhouse at Ashgrove, near Bansha, County Tipperary, during the Irish Civil War. He was serving as a despatch carrier for the anti-Treaty Irish Republican Army (IRA) column commanded by Denis Lacey when he was fatally shot in the head during an engagement with National Army forces on 18 February 1923. He was ten years old; some pension-file records give his age as approximately eleven. He has since been described in many press articles, archival commentary and other national media coverage as the youngest recorded member of the IRA to die during the conflict.

== Family background ==
=== The Quirke family of Ashgrove ===
The Quirke family had farmed at Ashgrove, in the parish of Bansha, for several generations. Edmund's father, James Quirke, was born there on 24 April 1867, one of five children of Edmond ("Ned") Quirke (c. 1828–1913) and Margaret Quirke (née Heffernan; 1838–1905), who had married in 1865. James Quirke continued to farm at Ashgrove into adulthood and lived there until his death in September 1957.

=== The Kelly family of Newtown, New Inn ===
Edmund's mother, Anne Quirke (née Kelly), was born on 1 April 1880 at Newtown, New Inn, County Tipperary, a daughter of John Kelly (1828–1890) and Bridget Kelly (née Grady; 1839–1901). James Quirke and Anne Kelly married at New Inn on 8 February 1910, after which the couple settled at Ashgrove.

Anne's elder brother, Rev. Edmond Kelly (1874–1955), was a Catholic priest who served as a British Army chaplain during the First World War and was awarded the Military Cross in 1917 for his conduct near Ypres. Genealogical research published in the Tipperary Star in 1967 details the family connection with the Australian bushranger Ned Kelly.

== Early life ==
Edmund was the second of six children born to James and Anne Quirke: Margaret Josephine (b. 1911), Edmund (b. 1912), Bridget Mary (b. 1913; later Chatterton, d. 2000), John (b. 1915), Anna ("Nancy", b. 1916) and Mary (b. 1918). Anne Quirke died at Ashgrove on 11 November 1918, when Edmund was six; family sources attribute her death to the influenza pandemic of that year. James Quirke, then a widower with six young children, continued to run the farm at Ashgrove. Some months after Edmund's death, in August 1923, he remarried, to Mary O'Flaherty, with whom he had a further daughter, Philomena, born in 1925.

== Civil War service ==
By 1922, South Tipperary was a centre of anti-Treaty activity, falling within the area of the Third ("South") Tipperary Brigade of the IRA, part of the 2nd Southern Division. Edmund Quirke acted as a despatch carrier, or courier, for the Bansha Company, and his pension file records him as having carried messages for local commanders including Dan Breen and Denis "Dinny" Lacey, who took command of the brigade in March 1922. A handwritten note in his Military Service Pensions Collection (MSPC) file also describes him, for pension purposes, as having acted in an intelligence-gathering capacity.

== Death ==
On 18 February 1923, National Army troops carried out an operation in the Glen of Aherlow directed against Lacey's IRA active-service unit, which was billeted at the Quirke family farmhouse at Ashgrove. In the engagement that followed, Lacey and several other IRA men were killed, including William McGrath and Michael Ryan; a fourth man, Patrick McDonough, died of his wounds the following day. Edmund Quirke, then in the farmyard, was struck in the head by a bullet and died a short time afterwards. His death certificate recorded the cause of death as a bullet wound "accidentally received."

The Military Service Registration Board later attempted to establish which side had fired the fatal shot but was unable to do so. Correspondence in Edmund's pension file shows that a local IRA officer, Michael Fitzpatrick, told the board in January 1934 that he had questioned several participants in the engagement and found it impossible to determine with certainty whose bullet had killed the boy, owing to extensive cross-firing between neighbouring houses and separate parties of Free State troops.

Quirke's death was one of twenty-seven fatalities of children under fifteen recorded during the Civil War in the twenty-six counties, according to the University College Cork (UCC) Irish Civil War Fatalities Project. Within County Tipperary, the UCC project records 112 combatant and civilian fatalities between June 1922 and May 1923, of which the killings of Lacey, Quirke and their companions at Ashgrove formed part.

== Aftermath: the pension application ==
In March 1933, James Quirke applied under the Army Pensions Act, 1932, for an allowance or gratuity in respect of his son's death, on the grounds that Edmund had died in the service of the IRA. In support of the application, both Dan Breen, by then a TD, and Michael Fitzpatrick, a former quartermaster of the 2nd Southern Division, provided statements confirming that Edmund had served as a despatch carrier under Lacey's command and had been present at Ashgrove when Lacey's party was attacked.

In June 1934, the Military Service Registration Board issued a formal service certificate confirming that Edmund Quirke had been a member of the IRA, serving as a despatch carrier with the South Tipperary Brigade from 1922 until his death, and that he had been killed during an engagement between IRA and National Army forces at Ashgrove on 18 February 1923. Despite this official recognition of his service, James Quirke's application for a pension or gratuity was ultimately refused: under Section 8 of the 1932 Act, the board determined that, as Edmund had been a child of ten with no income of his own, James Quirke could not be considered to have been financially dependent on his son at the time of his death. No pension or gratuity was ever awarded in respect of Edmund Quirke.

== Legacy and modern recognition ==
Edmund Quirke is listed on the Third Tipperary Brigade's roll of honour as a courier of the Bansha Company killed in crossfire at his home, aged ten, and is described there as the youngest name on the brigade's roll.

On 24 October 2017, the Military Archives released a further tranche of some 5,000 files from the Military Service Pensions Collection, including Edmund Quirke's file. Irish national media, including the Irish Examiner and TheJournal.ie, reported on the release and highlighted Quirke's case, describing him as potentially the youngest recorded IRA fatality of the Civil War.

His death has since been examined as part of the UCC Irish Civil War Fatalities Project, directed by historian Helene O'Keeffe, which studies child casualties of the conflict; the project's findings were also published by RTÉ in 2024. The project notes that, although Quirke was formally classified for pension purposes as an IRA despatch rider and intelligence officer, he was in substance an unintended victim of crossfire between the two sides. Historian Denis G. Marnane's account of the Civil War in County Tipperary likewise discusses Quirke's death in the context of the National Army's February 1923 operation against Lacey's column in the Glen of Aherlow.

== See also ==
- Denis Lacey
- Irish Civil War
- Edmond Kelly (maternal uncle)
