= David Power Conyngham =

Irish novelist

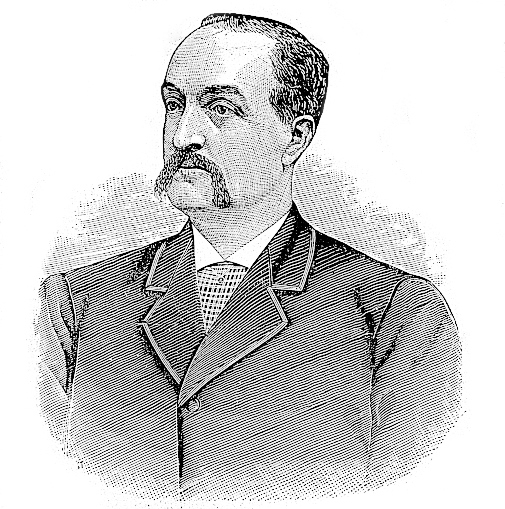
David Power Conyngham

David Power Conyngham (c. 1825–1883) was an Irish journalist, war correspondent, and novelist. His writing can generally be classified as either Irish historical fiction or works about the American Civil War.

== Life ==
Conyngham was born about 1825 near Killenaule, County Tipperary to well-to-do farmers John and Catherine Power Cunningham. He was a cousin of novelist Charles Kickham on his mother's side. He was a member of Young Ireland and after the Famine rebellion of 1848 he drops out of sight for a time. It is not clear whether he went to America. However, after a few years he was contributing articles to the Tipperary Free Press.

He arrived in the United States in April 1861 and joined the staff of the New York Herald, and was a war correspondent with the Irish Brigade. By then he spelled his name "Conyngham". He returned to Ireland in December and married Anne Corcoran. By March 1863, he was back in the United States and a captain, serving as an aide-de-camp to fellow Young Irelander General Thomas Francis Meagher at Chancellorsville. He continued to file reports with the Herald. His brother William served in the Confederacy. Conyngham was wounded in the Battle of Resaca and mentioned in dispatches for bravery.

After the war, he became editor of the New York Tablet. He died of pneumonia at his home on Vandam Street in Manhattan on April 1, 1883 and is buried in Calvary Cemetery (Queens).

== Works ==
Conyngham's historical novels fed the growing Irish nationalism of the late 19th century.

- Sherman’s March through the South (1865)
- The Irish Brigade and Its Campaigns (1867)
- Sarsfield (1871)
- The O'Mahony, Chief of the Comeraghs (1879)
- Ireland past and present (1883)

=== The Lives of the Irish Saints and Martyrs ===
The Lives of the Irish Saints and Martyrs was published in New York City in 1870. It contains the lives of a number of Irish saints, including Abban of Kill-Abban. Coningham's early sources include the Martyrology of Tallaght and the Martyrology of Gorman.

=== Soldiers of the Cross ===
Soldiers of the Cross is an account of chaplains and women religious who served as nurses during the American Civil War. As Conyngham tried to collect the histories of the sisters who served during the Civil War, more than one community declined to cooperate out of a sense of humility. Conyngham died before publishing Soldiers of the Cross. A relative gave the manuscript to the University of Notre Dame, where it lay undiscovered in the archives for over 100 years. Newly edited, it was published in 2019.

== Sources ==
- Holweck, F. G., A Biographical Dictionary of the Saints. St. Louis, MO: B. Herder Book Co. 1924.
