= Kelly family (Irish-Australian) =

Family from County Tipperary in Ireland

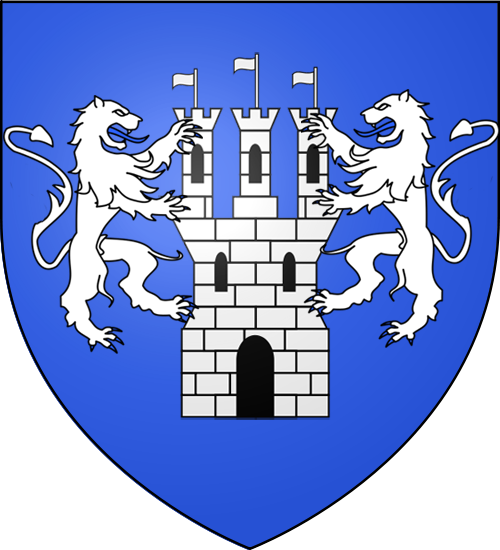
- Country: Ireland (County Tipperary); Australia (Victoria)

The Kelly family is an Irish and Australian family originating from County Tipperary in Ireland. It is known for the bushranger and convicted murderer Ned Kelly (1854–1880) and his brother Dan Kelly (1861–1880), as well as their sister Kate Kelly (1863–1898), a supporting figure for the siblings during their time on the run. The family also produced the Catholic priest and military chaplain Edmond Kelly (1874–1955), who was decorated with the Military Cross.

== Origins of the name ==
The surname Kelly most often anglicises the Irish Ó Ceallaigh, "descendant of Ceallach," the name of at least seven, and by some counts as many as nine, genuinely separate septs scattered across Ireland, the best known being the Ó Ceallaigh of Uí Maine in counties Galway and Roscommon. In County Tipperary and neighbouring Kilkenny, however, the surname more often derives from a separate and unrelated name, Ó Caollaidhe ("descendant of Caollaidhe"), whose Tipperary branch were anciently reckoned chiefs of a district called Aolmhagh. This distinct root also produced the variant anglicised forms Kealy, Keely, Quealy and, in County Waterford, Queally. Sir William Petty's 1659 census recorded ninety Kelly families in County Tipperary, around thirty of them listed separately as "Kealy" — a detail consistent with a family history distinct from the celebrated Uí Maine sept further west. Family traditions vary as to which of these two roots this particular Kelly family descends from; a fuller account of the surname's origins in Tipperary appears in a related article.

== Origins in Ireland ==
This Kelly family originates in County Tipperary. Thomas Kelly (1800–1860), a native of the area around Clonbrogan, Moyglass, married Mary Cody in 1819 and settled on a small holding at Clonbrogan. Thomas Kelly and six of his seven children emigrated to Australia, one of them becoming the father of the bushranger Ned Kelly.

His brother Edmond Kelly (aft. 1799–1867) remained in Ireland and settled at Newtown, New Inn. His son John Kelly (1828–1890) married Bridget Grady in 1872 and founded the line that produced the Catholic priest Edmond Kelly.

== Family ==
The family descends from John Kelly (c. 1775) and Ellen Head (c. 1777) of Moyglass, County Tipperary, through two of their sons: Thomas Kelly, whose grandson was the bushranger Ned Kelly, and Edmond Kelly, whose grandson was the priest and Military Cross recipient Edmond Kelly:

Michael Kelly (1735-1805), Parish Priest in County Tipperary, great-great-uncle of Edmond Kelly
┊

- John Kelly (c. 1775) × Ellen Head (c. 1777), Moyglass, Co. Tipperary
  - Thomas Kelly (1800–1860), of Clonbrogan, Co. Tipperary; m. Mary Cody
    - John "Red" Kelly (1820–1866); m. (18 Nov 1850) Ellen Quinn (1832–1923)
      - Annie Kelly (1853–1872)
      - Edward "Ned" Kelly (1854–1880), bushranger
      - Margaret "Maggie" Kelly (1857–1896)
      - James "Jim" Kelly (1859–1946)
      - Daniel "Dan" Kelly (1861–1880), bushranger
      - Catherine "Kate" Kelly (1863–1898)
      - Grace Kelly (1865–1940)
  - Edmond Kelly (after 1799 – 1867), farmer, Ireland; m. Catherine Kearney
    - John Kelly (1828–1890), farm manager; m. (1 Feb 1872) Bridget Gready (1839–1901)
      - Edmond Kelly (1874–1955), Catholic priest, military chaplain, Military Cross (1917)
      - Catherine Fitzgerald (née Kelly) (1876–1948)
      - James Kelly (1878–1947)
      - Anne Quirke (née Kelly) (1880–1918)
        - Edmund Quirke (c. 1912 – 1923), youngest known member of the I.R.A. to be killed, aged 10
      - Jeremiah Kelly (1883–1960)

== Notable members ==
=== Michael Kelly, P.P. (1735–1805) ===
Michael Kelly was born in 1735 in the parish of Moyglass, County Tipperary, probably at Curraghtarsna. He served as curate (C.C.) at Killenaule for about six months in 1764, as recorded in that year's parish baptismal register, which bears his signature "Mich Kelly". He appears in the 1766 religious census as "Mich Kelly" of Garrankyle, Cloneen. He became parish priest (P.P.) of Cloneen and Killusty, a position he held by at least 1792 and retained until his death. He died on 16 October 1805, aged 70, and was buried in the old cemetery of Cloneen.

O'Dwyer's list of the Cashel and Emly clergy lists Michael Kelly as the great-grand-uncle of Canon Edmond Kelly (1874–1955), P.P. of Killenaule from 1937.

=== Clonbrogan branch ===
==== John Kelly, known as "Red" (1820–1866) ====
John Kelly, nicknamed "Red Kelly" for his red hair and known in the colony simply as Red, was baptised on 20 February 1820 in the parish of Killenaule and Moyglass, County Tipperary, the eldest of seven children of Thomas Kelly (1800–1860) and Mary Cody, who farmed less than half an acre near Clonbrogan, about a mile west of Moyglass.

Working as a farm labourer, Kelly was accused of stealing two pigs worth about six pounds from a James Cooney of Ballysheehan, near Cashel, which he was said to have sold on at Cahir market some fourteen miles away. He was convicted at Tipperary and sentenced to seven years' transportation; the surviving convict indent records his trial on 1 June 1841 and describes him, aged twenty-two, as five feet eight-and-a-half inches tall, of fresh complexion, with reddish hair and whiskers and blue eyes. He embarked on the convict ship Prince Regent on 7 August 1841 and landed at Hobart Town, Van Diemen's Land (present-day Tasmania), on 2 January 1842, entering a year's probation before assignment to a station gang.

He was granted his certificate of freedom on 11 January 1848 and crossed Bass Strait to the Port Phillip District, where he found irregular work near Wallan Wallan as a fencer and splitter before being taken on as a bush carpenter by the farmer James Quinn. There, thirty-year-old Kelly caught the eye of Quinn's eighteen-year-old daughter Ellen; defying her father, who did not favour the match, the couple are said to have eloped, and Ellen fell pregnant to him in May 1850. They married on 18 November 1850 at St Francis' Catholic Church, Melbourne, and moved into a cottage on the Quinns' Wallan property; their first child, a daughter, survived only briefly.

Over the following years Kelly supported his growing family through a combination of gold-digging, horse-dealing and dairy farming; in 1853 he set off alone for the Bendigo goldfields, returning with enough money to buy a farm near Beveridge, north of Melbourne, in 1854, with a further half-acre block added later the same year. Around 1859–60 Kelly built with his own hands the small timber cottage, still standing on Kelly Street, Beveridge, in which several of his children, including Ned, spent their early years.

Farming at Beveridge did not prosper, and by the early 1860s Kelly had begun drinking heavily. In 1864 he sold the cottage for £80 and moved the family further north to a rented forty-acre holding on Hughes Creek at Avenel, where he supplemented farm work with horse-dealing. His own resentment at his conviction and transportation reportedly coloured his son's later view of the authorities: Kelly maintained he had been a victim of English rule in Ireland, a sentiment Ned would later echo in his Jerilderie Letter.

In 1865, some thirteen years after his release, Kelly was accused of stealing a calf belonging to a neighbouring farmer; police searching his property found meat in the cooler and a calf hide tanning outside. The charge of cattle-stealing itself was dismissed, but Kelly was convicted of unlawfully possessing the hide and, unable to raise the £25 fine, served roughly four months' hard labour. He emerged from gaol in broken health and, within weeks, was fined again, this time for drunkenness. Suffering from dropsy (oedema) and worn down by alcoholism, he died at Avenel on 27 December 1866, two days after Christmas, at the age of forty-six; his twelve-year-old son Ned is said to have signed the death certificate. He was buried in an unmarked grave in Avenel cemetery on 29 December. His death left Ellen Kelly a widow with seven children aged from eighteen months to thirteen years; the following year the family moved to Greta, in Victoria's north-east, to be near her Quinn and Lloyd relatives.

==== Ned Kelly (1854–1880) ====
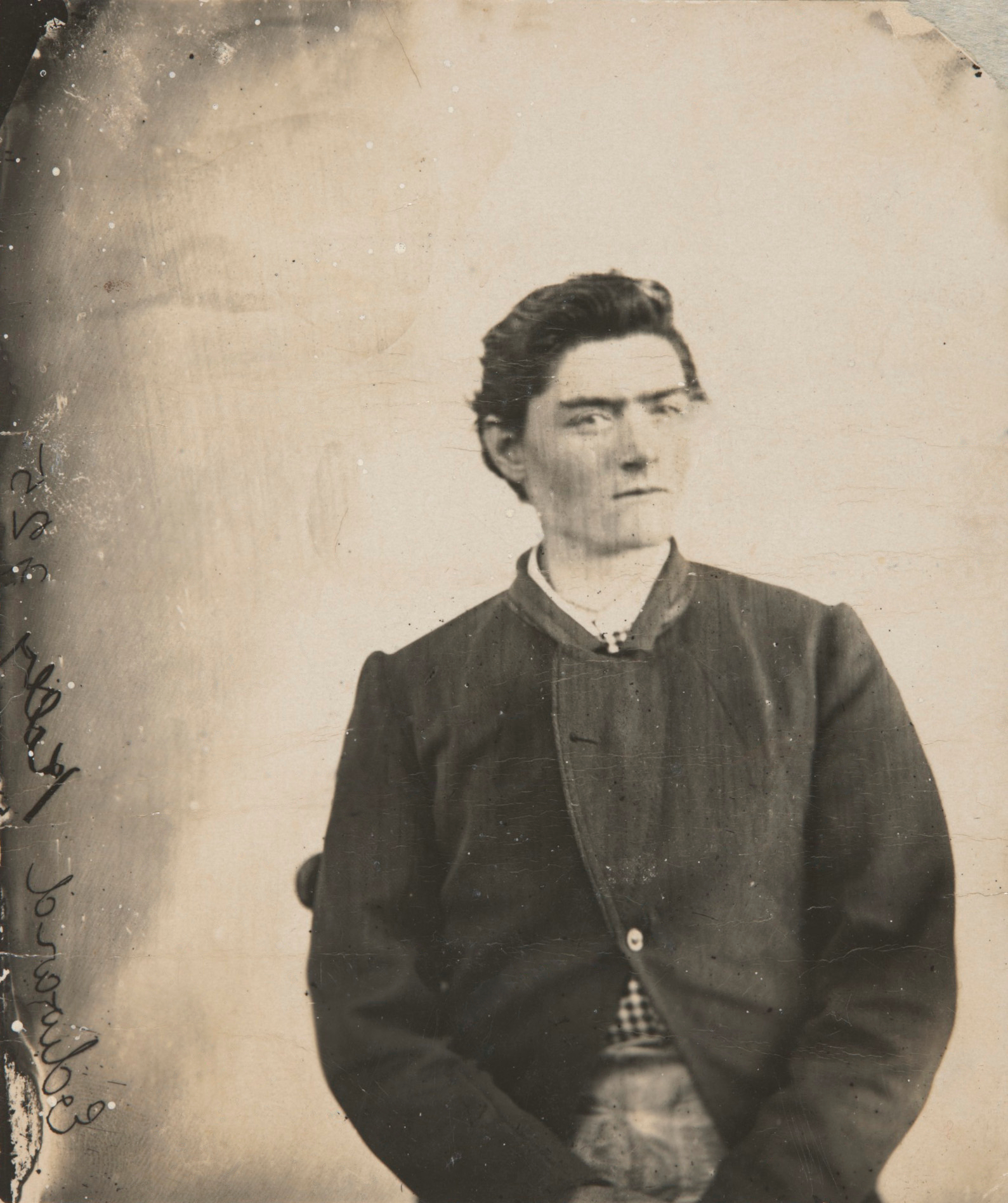
Ned Kelly at age 15

Edward Kelly, known as Ned Kelly, was born in December 1854 at Beveridge. From 1878 to 1880, he led the "Kelly Gang," carrying out several major bank robberies and killings including the murder of a policeman.

The culmination came at the siege of Glenrowan (27–28 June 1880), where Ned, wearing homemade armour, confronted the police. He was executed by hanging on 11 November 1880 at Melbourne Gaol.

==== Dan Kelly (1861–1880) ====
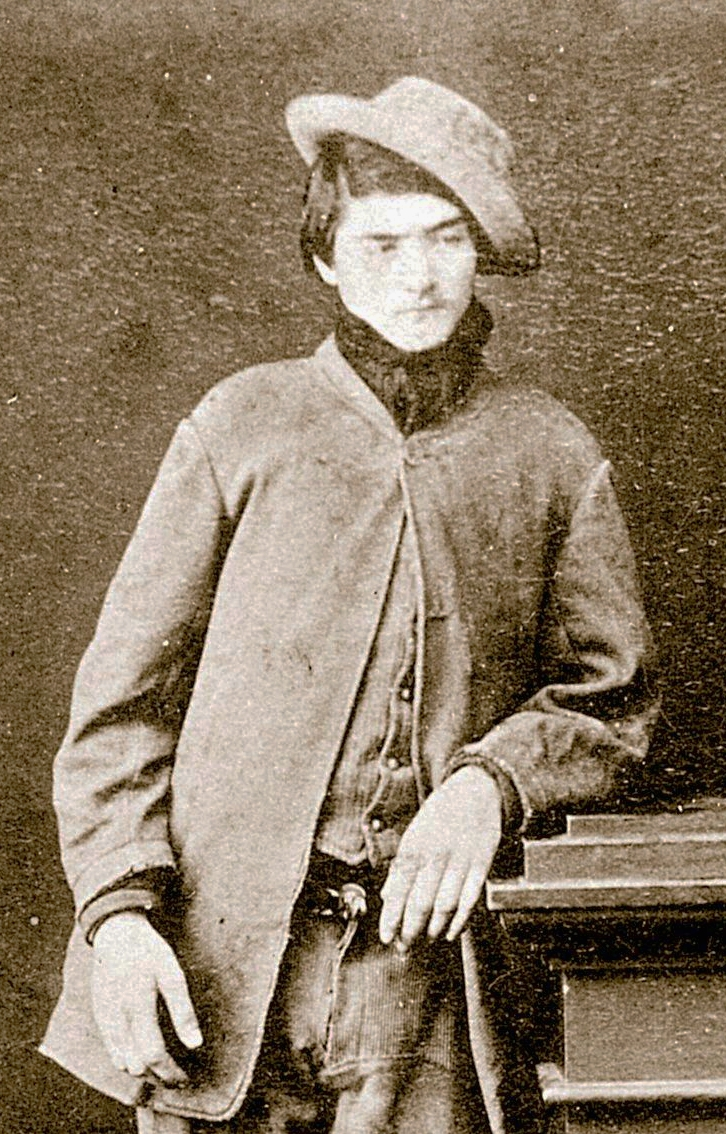
Dan Kelly

Daniel "Dan" Kelly was born on 1 June 1861 at Beveridge. Raised near Greta after his father's death, he joined his elder brother Ned in the Kelly Gang in 1878. He died with Steve Hart in the burning Glenrowan Inn during the siege of Glenrowan on 28 June 1880; the two bodies, found side by side and too badly burned to identify other than by build, have fuelled a long-running debate over whether the pair took their own lives.

==== Kate Kelly (1863–1898) ====
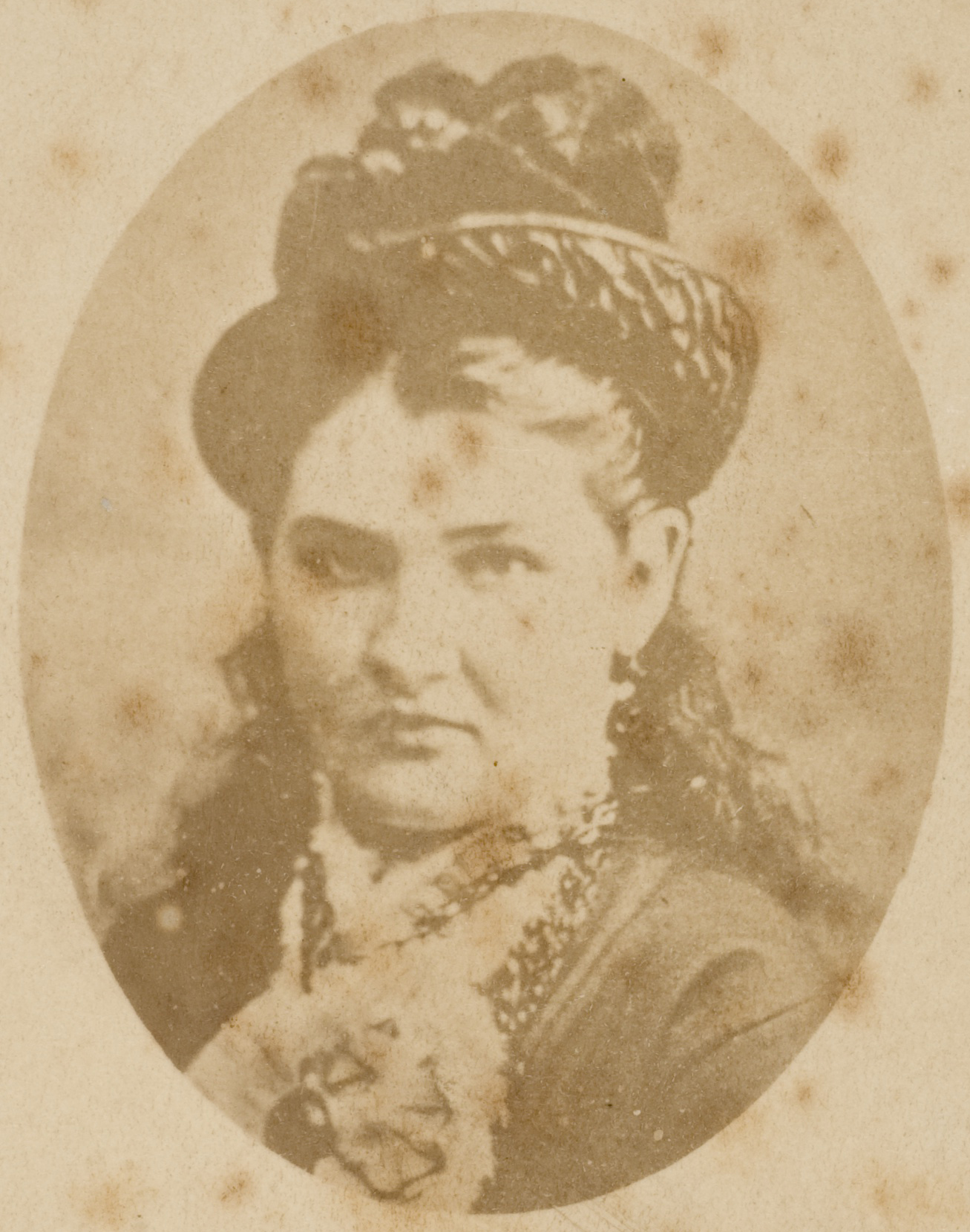
Kate Kelly

Catherine Ada "Kate" Kelly was born on 12 July 1863 at Beveridge, the seventh child of John and Ellen Kelly. Following the 1878 Fitzpatrick incident, in which she was allegedly the object of an unwanted advance by Constable Alexander Fitzpatrick — an account disputed by historians for lacking contemporary corroboration — her mother was gaoled and Ned and Dan fled into hiding.

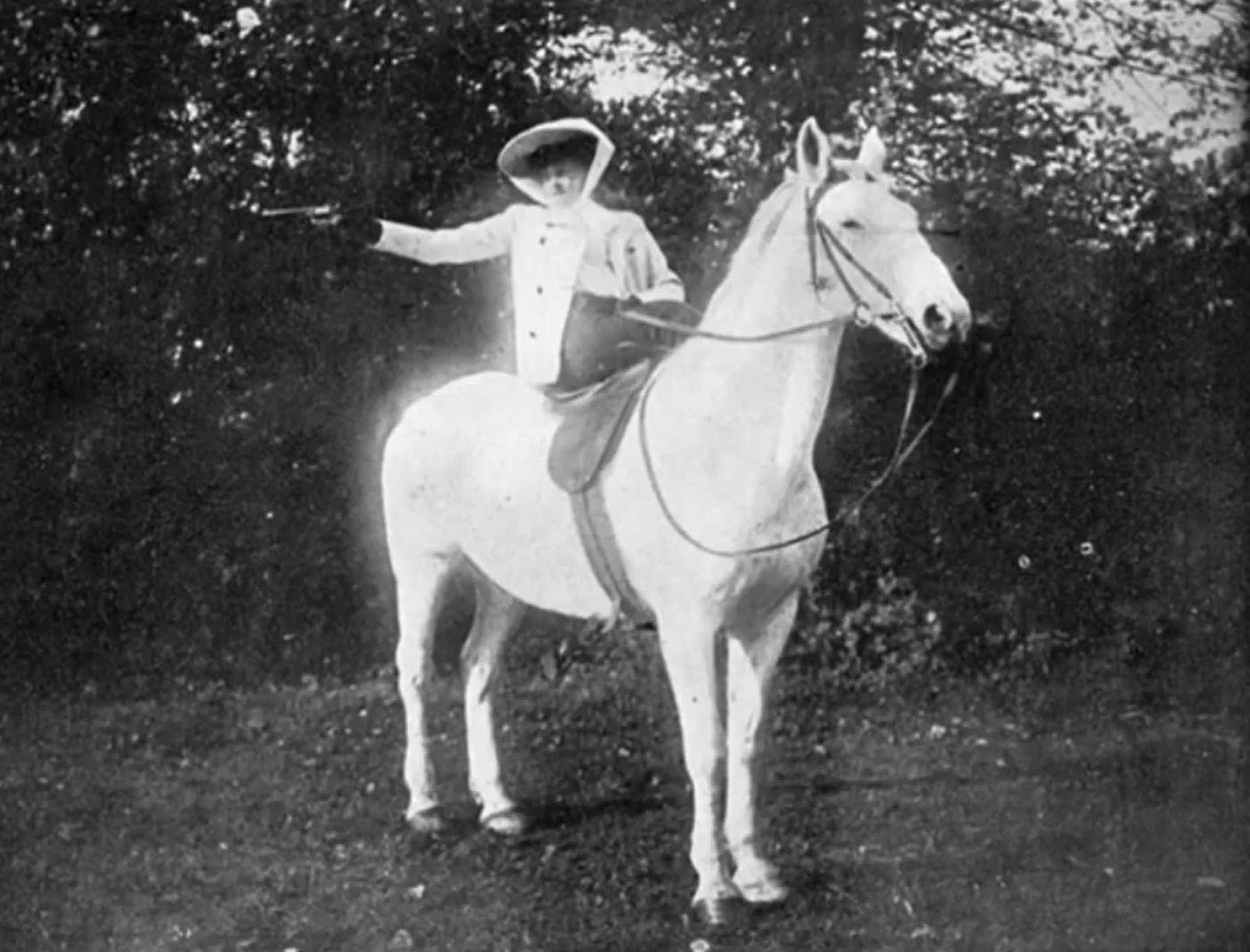
The character of Kate Kelly in the 1906 film The Story of the Kelly Gang

After Ned's execution she toured briefly as a stage performer, before marrying horse-breaker William Henry Foster in 1888 and settling near Forbes, New South Wales, where she died in 1898. She has since become a recurring figure in film, song and biography, beginning with a screen appearance in The Story of the Kelly Gang (1906).

=== Newtown branch ===
==== Edmund Quirke (1912–1923) ====
Edmund Quirke was born on 27 April 1912 at Ashgrove, near Bansha, County Tipperary, the second of six children of James Quirke, a farmer, and Anne Quirke, née Kelly (1880–1918). His mother, a granddaughter of Edmond Kelly (after 1799–1867), made him a cousin of Canon Edmond Kelly. Orphaned of his mother in 1918, he served as a child as a dispatch carrier for the Bansha Company of the anti-Treaty IRA during the Irish Civil War, carrying messages for local commanders including Dan Breen and Denis Lacey. On 18 February 1923, when Lacey's column, quartered at the family farm, was attacked by the National Army, ten-year-old Edmund Quirke was fatally shot in the head; the exact source of the shot was never established with certainty. Several Irish media outlets have since described him as the youngest known IRA member killed during the conflict. His case was later examined by historian Helene O'Keeffe as part of University College Cork's Irish Civil War fatalities project.

==== Edmond Kelly M.C. P.P. (1874–1955) ====
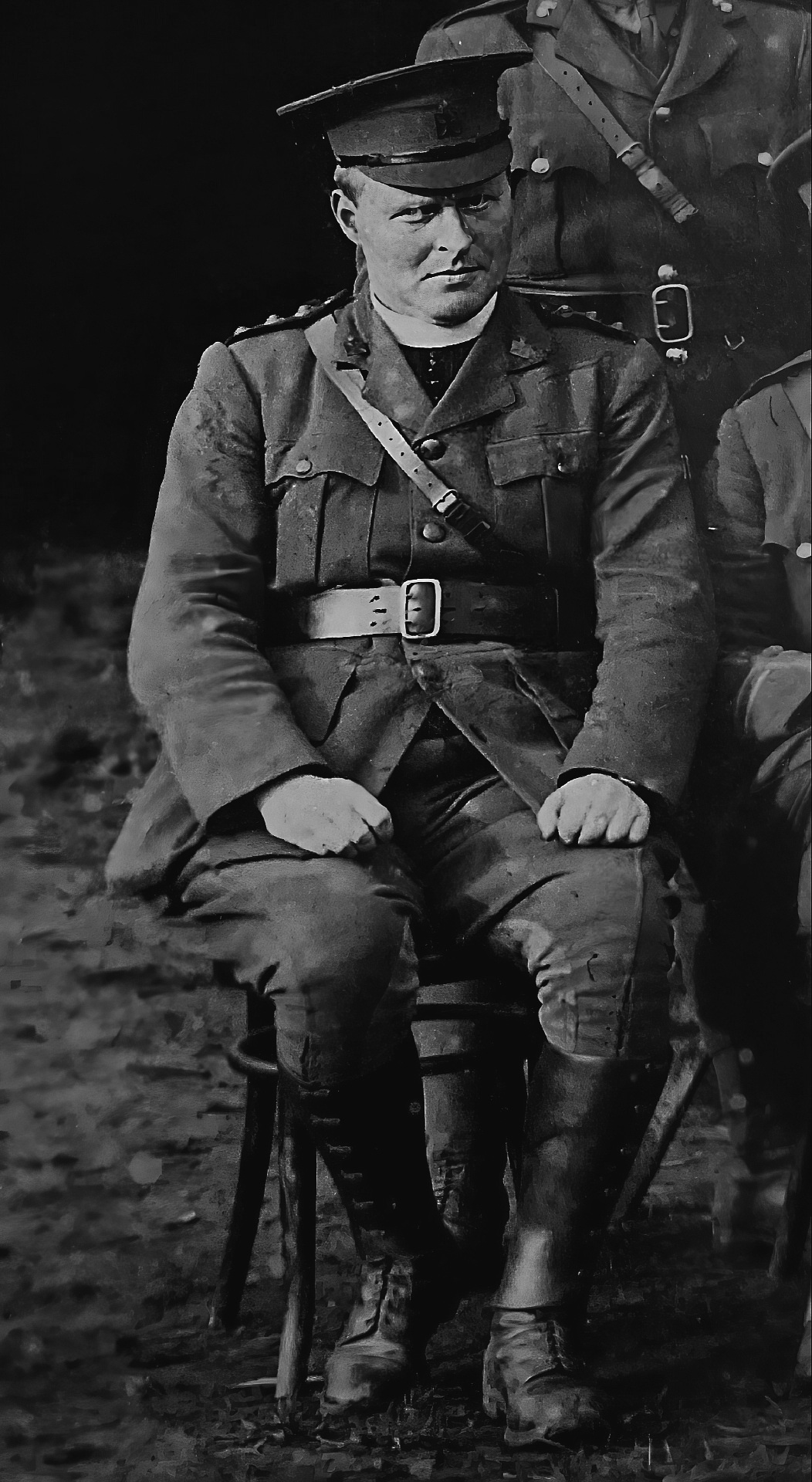
Edmond Kelly during the First World War

Edmond Kelly was born on 8 June 1874 at Newtown, New Inn, County Tipperary, a cousin of the bushranger Ned Kelly. Ordained a priest in 1900 at St Patrick's College, Maynooth, he served on mission in South Africa until 1911 before returning to parish ministry in Ireland.

A military chaplain with the 8th Battalion, Royal Irish Fusiliers from 1915, he was awarded the Military Cross in 1917 for his conduct at the Battle of Passchendaele. From 1934 until his death on 11 October 1955 in Dublin, he was parish priest of Killenaule and Moyglass, holding the titles of Canon and Vicar Forane.

== See also ==
- The Story of the Kelly Gang
- Ó Ceallaigh
- Ely O'Carroll

=== Bibliography ===
- Corfield, Justin (2003). The Ned Kelly Encyclopaedia. Lothian Books. ISBN 0-7344-0596-0.
- Kieza, Grantlee (2017). Mrs Kelly. HarperCollins Australia. ISBN 978-1-74309-717-5.
- Macfarlane, Ian (2012). The Kelly Gang Unmasked. Oxford University Press. ISBN 978-0-19-551966-2.
- McQuilton, John (1987). The Kelly Outbreak, 1878–1880. Melbourne University Press. ISBN 0-522-84332-8.
- Molony, John (2001). Ned Kelly. Melbourne University Publishing. ISBN 978-0-522-85013-0.
- Cormick, Craig (2014). Ned Kelly: Under the Microscope. CSIRO Publishing. ISBN 978-1-4863-0178-2.
- Jones, Ian (2010). Ned Kelly: A Short Life. Hachette UK. ISBN 978-0-7336-2579-4.

==== Archival and genealogical sources ====
- "Clerical Register – Edmond Kelly". Clericus Database, St Patrick's College, Maynooth.
- "Resource linked to Edmond Kelly's clerical register entry". Clericus Database, St Patrick's College, Maynooth.
- "Civil birth registration of Edmond Kelly (1874) — General Register Office of Ireland, vol. 554, p. 4, entry no. 02154516, l. 287, registration ID 8528221" (PDF). IrishGenealogy.ie.
- "Edmund Kelly, military chaplain — service file". The National Archives (UK), Discovery.
- "Edmund Kelly, military chaplain — second file". The National Archives (UK), Discovery.
- National Library of Ireland, Catholic Parish Registers, parish of New Inn & Knockgraffon, microfilm 02502/03.
- Diocese of Cashel and Emly, Archives — clergy appointments, 1911–1955.
- War Office, Military Cross Citation Records, Ypres sector, 1917.
- Rockwell College, College Archives, Cashel, County Tipperary.
- St Patrick's College, Maynooth, class registers (SPCM), 1898–1899.
- Diocese of Cashel and Emly, clergy obituary register, 1955.
- Kelly, Joe M. (Dr), Oranmore, County Galway — on the life and ministry of Canon Kelly.
- "John 'Red' Kelly (1820–1866)". Slieveardagh.com.
- "A long way from Tipperary – Australian outlaw's father discovered in the Irish Parish Records". TheGenealogist. 15 March 2024.
- "John Kelly's Former House". Victorian Heritage Database. Heritage Council of Victoria.
- Wilson, Jacqueline Zara. "Kelly, Ellen (1832–1923)". Australian Dictionary of Biography. National Centre of Biography, Australian National University.

==== Period press ====
- "Kilkenny People, 24 April 1987, p. 5". Internet Archive.
- Nationalist and Munster Advertiser, 27 August 1988, p. 3.
- Belfast Newsletter, 18 June 1955, p. 2.
- Evening Press, 3 April 1985, p. 12.
- Tipperary Star, 10 August 1985, p. 13.
- Tipperary Star, 6 September 1986, p. 16.
- "Irish Press, 28 May 1955, pp. 1 and 10". Internet Archive.
- "Tipperary Star, 4 April 1987, vol. 11, no. 14, p. 1". Internet Archive.
- Gary Dean. "Descendants Of John Kelly – Ned Kelly's World". Ned Kelly's World (Glen Rowen Cobb & Co Pty Ltd).

==== Writings by Edmond Kelly ====
- "Author:Edmond Kelly (1874–1955)". Wikisource.
- Kelly, Edmond. Letter to Bishop Ryan on the death of Major Willie Redmond (10 June 1917), in Letters from the Front (1915–1918).

==== Studies and works ====
- Dennehy, John. In a Time of War: Tipperary 1914–1918. 2013 — contains transcribed letters by Kelly.
- Cooper Walker, C. A. Book of the Seventh Service Battalion: The Royal Inniskilling Fusiliers from Tipperary to Ypres. 1920 — Kelly is mentioned as chaplain of this battalion.
- O'Dwyer, Christopher (1977). "Archbishop Butler's Visitation Book". Archivium Hibernicum. 34: 1–49. doi:10.2307/25487419.
- Brennan, John Martin. "Irish Catholic Chaplains in the First World War."

=== External links ===
- John "Red" Kelly – Father of Australian outlaw Ned Kelly, fethard.com.
- Trove — National Library of Australia.
