= Edmond Kelly =

Irish Military Chaplain and priest (1874-1955)

Canon Edmond Kelly
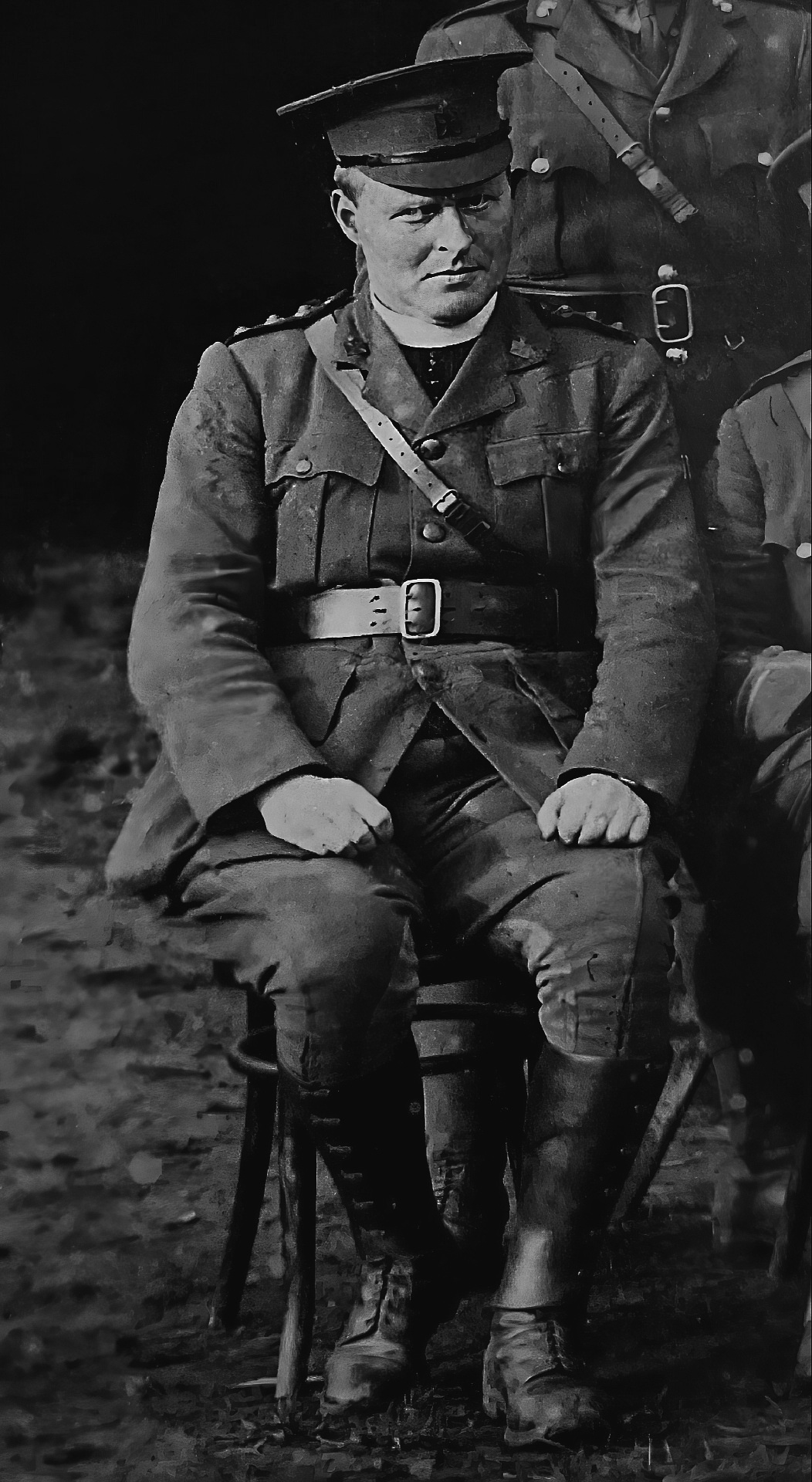
- Born: 8 June 1874; Newtown, New Inn, County Tipperary, Ireland
- Died: 11 October 1955 (aged 81); St John of God University Hospital, Stillorgan, Dublin, Ireland
- Military career
- Branch: British Army
- Service years: 1915–1917
- Rank: Military chaplain
- Unit: 8th Royal Irish Fusiliers
- Conflicts: First World War: Battle of Loos; Battle of the Somme; Battle of Ginchy; Battle of Messines; Battle of Passchendaele; Battle of Langemarck
- Awards: Military Cross; Mentioned in dispatches

Canon Edmond Kelly MC (8 June 1874 – 11 October 1955) was an Irish Catholic priest who served as a military chaplain with the British Army during the First World War. He was awarded the Military Cross in 1917 for gallantry during the Battle of Passchendaele near Ypres. After the war, he returned to parish work in County Tipperary and served as Parish Priest of Killenaule and Moyglass from 1934 until his death in 1955.

From 1915, Kelly served as chaplain to the 16th (Irish) Division, initially alongside the well-known Jesuit chaplain Fr William Doyle, SJ, who was killed near Frezenberg on the very day, 16 August 1917, that Kelly earned his Military Cross tending the wounded east of Ypres. He also left a detailed first-hand account of the death of Major Willie Redmond, the Irish Parliamentary Party MP killed at the Battle of Messines in June 1917. In retirement in Killenaule, Kelly restored parish registers dating to 1743, commissioned a memorial window from the studio of Harry Clarke, and oversaw the building of several national schools across the parish.

== Early life and education ==
Edmund Kelly was born on 8 June 1874 in Newtown, New Inn, County Tipperary, Ireland. He was the eldest of five children born to John Kelly (1828–1890), a farmer, and Bridget Kelly (née Grady) (1839–1901). He is a second cousin to the Australian bushranger Ned Kelly.

His four younger siblings were Catherine ("Kate"), born in 1876, who married into the Fitzgerald family; James ("Jim"), born in 1878, who took over the family farm at Newtown; Anne, born in 1880, who married into the Quirke family; and Jeremiah, born in 1883, who later settled at Ballingeary, near Cahir. These family connections were later recorded in his obituary, which named surviving relatives from the Fitzgerald, Kelly and Quirke families.

Edmond Kelly received his early education locally before attending Rockwell College. Rockwell was a boarding school conducted by the Holy Ghost Fathers. He later studied at St Patrick's College, Thurles and then at St Patrick's College, Maynooth. On 1 September 1897, he matriculated to Maynooth College to study for the priesthood in the Archdiocese of Cashel and Emly. The Maynooth admissions register records his entry into the second year of theology that year, and he appears, under the Latinised form "Edmundus Kelly", in the college's matriculation classpiece for 1898–99.

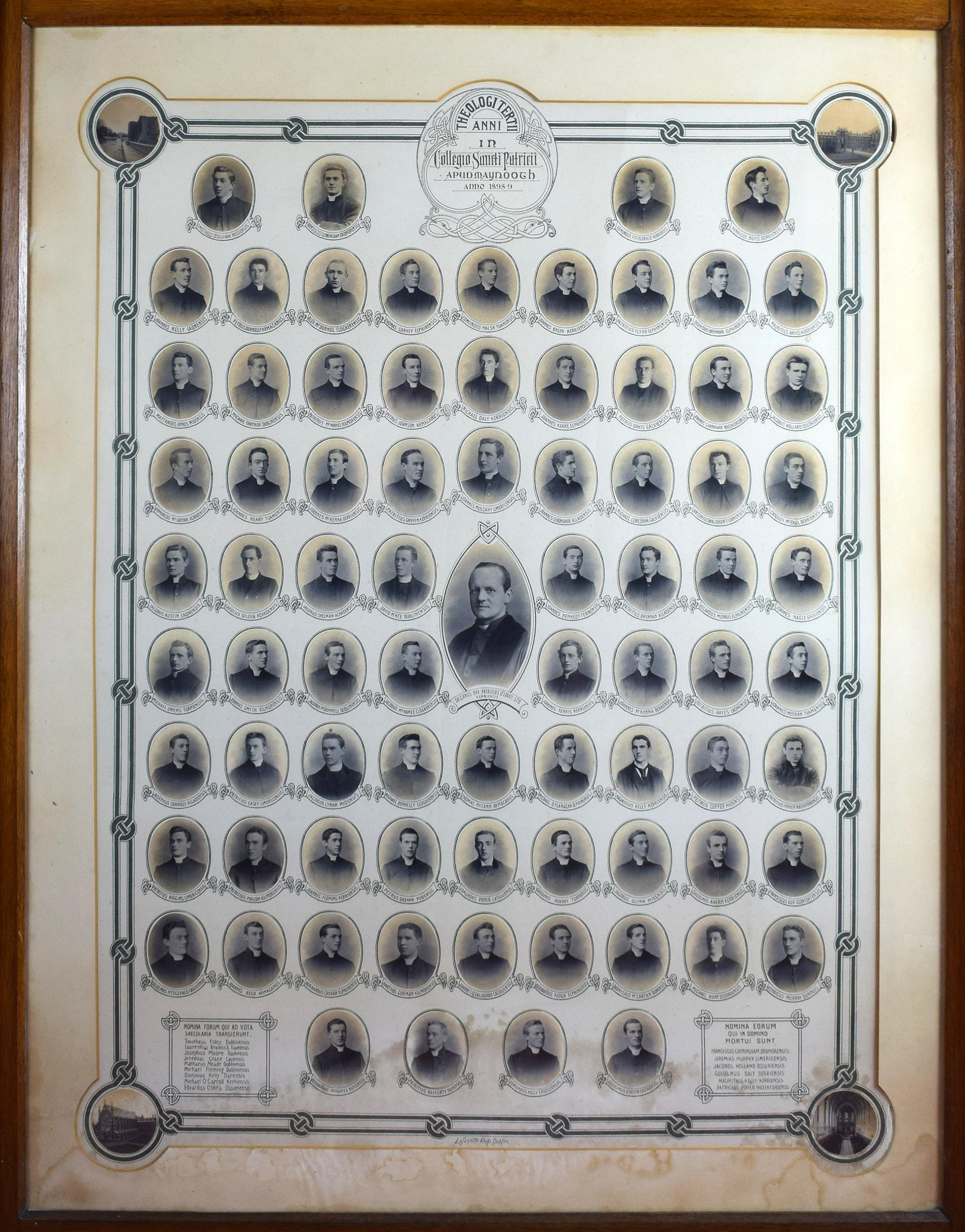
Edmundus Kelly featuring in this classpiece of Saint-Patrick's College, Maynooth - Matriculation Class of 1898-99

== Priesthood ==
=== Ordination and early ministry ===
Edmond Kelly was ordained to the priesthood on 17 June 1900 at St Patrick's College, Maynooth. Following his ordination, he served as a missionary in South Africa from 1900 to 1911. Upon returning to Ireland in 1911, he was appointed as a curate at Mullinahone in County Tipperary, where he served until 1915. His South African posting is recorded as having run from July 1900 until May 1911, when he was recalled to the Archdiocese of Cashel and Emly, following which he took up his curacy at Mullinahone.

=== Military chaplaincy ===
In a letter written shortly before he volunteered, Kelly argued that "the freedom of the world is at stake" and that "Irish soldiers at the present crisis are our truest patriots", warning that Irish neutrality would not spare the country if Germany prevailed. In 1915, Edmond Kelly volunteered for military service and was commissioned as a chaplain in the Army Chaplains' Department. He served on the Western Front, particularly in the Ypres Salient. From April 1915 he served as chaplain to the 16th (Irish) Division, attached at various points to both the 7th and 8th Battalions of the Royal Irish Fusiliers, and his obituary records that he was in frequent contact at the front with the Jesuit chaplain Fr William Doyle, who served in the same division and the same 8th Battalion. According to the same account, Kelly's active service took him through the Loos salient in 1915, the Somme and the Battle of Ginchy in 1916, the Battle of Messines in 1917, and the Third Battle of Ypres later that year, before he was present at the Menin Gate near Ypres on Armistice Day, 11 November 1918.

==== Death of Major Willie Redmond ====
On 10 June 1917, three days after the Battle of Messines, Kelly wrote a lengthy letter to Monsignor Ryan, P.P., V.G., of Tipperary, describing the death of Major Willie Redmond, the veteran Irish Parliamentary Party MP for East Clare, who had insisted on advancing with his men in the assault of 7 June 1917 and was mortally wounded soon after leaving the trenches. Kelly opened the letter:

"Before ridding myself of the dust of the battlefield, I must send you an account of the death of your guide, philosopher, and dear friend, Major Willie Redmond. There is something very strange and weirdly fitting about it in all its circumstances—so fitting that if the good God had given him a choice of deaths he would hardly have dared to ask for a death so entirely according to his dearest wishes."

He described Redmond as having been "absolutely miserable at the prospect of being left behind" before he obtained permission to take part in the attack, and recalled Redmond fastening his equipment while exclaiming, "Won't it be glorious to breast the sandbags with Old George Robey and all the boys!" Kelly went on to record that Ulster Division stretcher-bearers who recovered the wounded Redmond from no man's land treated him with a kindness that, in his words, "no Irish soldier expected anything else, for, after all, the Ulster men are Irish too." The letter, addressed from "B.E. Force C/o G.P.O." and signed "Father Edmund Kelly, 7/8 Royal Irish Fusiliers", is preserved among the sources used by historian John Dennehy in his study of Tipperary during the First World War.

==== Military Cross ====
On 16 August 1917, Edmond Kelly was awarded the Military Cross for tending the wounded under heavy fire. The official citation credited him with "conspicuous gallantry and devotion to duty in tending the wounded and dying of all denominations under the heaviest shell fire". The award was published in the London Gazette in March 1918. He was also mentioned in despatches during the war.

== Post-war ministry ==
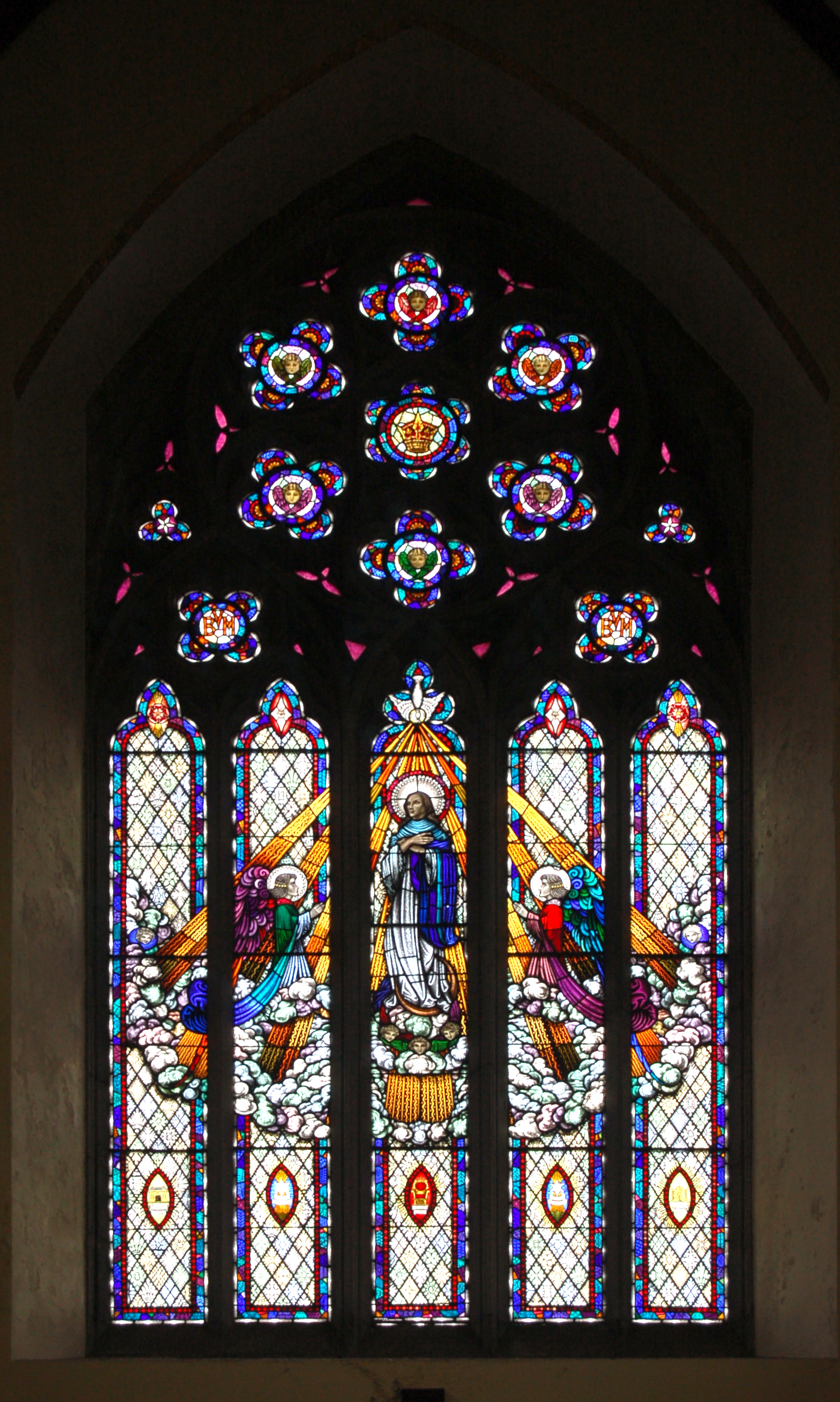
Harry Clarke window commissioned by Edmond Kelly for St Mary's Church in Killenaule

After the Armistice, Kelly remained with the army until 1920 before returning to parish duties in Ireland. In 1922, he was appointed curate at Tipperary, where he served for twelve years. In 1934, he became Parish Priest of Killenaule and Moyglass. Some contemporary accounts give a slightly different sequence, recording that Kelly was appointed Parish Priest of Cappawhite in 1934 and was transferred to Killenaule and Moyglass in 1937. He then initiated and led the construction of several schools in the County of Tipperary, such as St Catherine's Greystown and St Maal's Ballimonty in 1948 He also assisted at the opening of the new Patrician High School in Fethard in October 1946, and served for many years as a member of the South Tipperary Vocational Education Committee, of which his obituary described him as "one of the most alert and painstaking representatives that committee ever had".

During his tenure at Killenaule, Edmond Kelly oversaw improvements to St Mary's Church, including a window designed by Harry Clarke dedicated to the Assumption of Mary. The same church's pulpit had earlier been carved by William Pearse, a signatory of the Proclamation of the Irish Republic and brother of Patrick Pearse. In 1939, he discovered old parish registers dating from 1743 to 1801 and arranged for their restoration. The registers, found in a deteriorating condition in an outhouse on the parochial premises, are believed to be among the oldest surviving Catholic parish registers in the Archdiocese of Cashel and Emly, and the restored volumes, credited to "Edmundus Kelly", are preserved on microfilm at the National Library of Ireland.

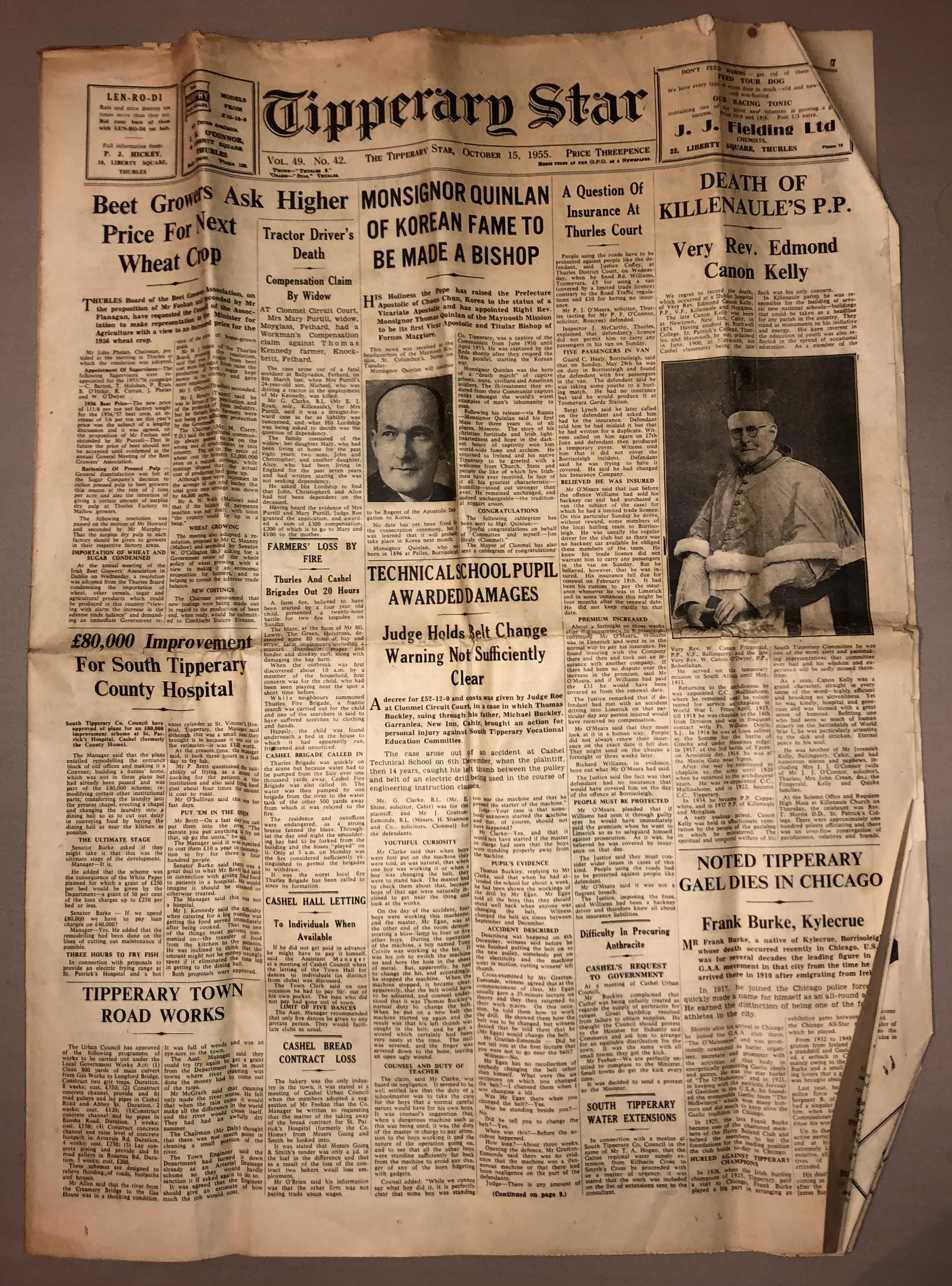
Canon Kelly in the front page of the newspaper Tipperary Star (Vol.49 No.42) on 15 October 1955

== Death ==
Canon Edmond Kelly died on 11 October 1955 in Dublin, aged 81. His funeral took place on 13 October 1955 at St Mary's Church in Killenaule, where he is buried. The Solemn Office and Requiem High Mass were celebrated by Rev. T. Morris, D.D., of St Patrick's College, before a congregation of around one hundred priests and, in the words of his obituary, "an over-flow congregation of parishioners, relatives and friends".

== Legacy ==
The Very Reverend Canon Edmond Kelly's Military Cross and other personal effects were later acquired by Tipperary Studies, the historical conservation and archives department within Tipperary County Council. The medal was purchased at auction from Fonsie Mealy Auctioneers in September 2016 so that it could be preserved and displayed publicly, and it has since formed part of the permanent Tipperary Studies collection at The Source library in Thurles. In 2017, during National Heritage Week, an exhibition featuring his Military Cross was held at The Source in Thurles. Again in 2018, a special conference and exhibition were organised by Tipperary Studies.

=== Exhibitions and lectures ===
Kelly's life and Military Cross have since been the subject of several further exhibitions and public lectures in County Tipperary:

- An exhibition on Kelly's Military Cross was mounted by Tipperary Studies at The Source, Thurles, in August 2017.
- An "Exhibition of the Life & Times of Canon Edmond Kelly" was held at the library in Killenaule in November 2017.
- A further exhibition was mounted at St Mary's Church, Killenaule, in February 2018.
- Kelly featured in the exhibition "On Active Service": Maynooth College, Chaplains & the Anti-Conscription Crisis, which opened at the Russell Library, Maynooth, in April 2018.
- His Military Cross remains on permanent display at The Source library in Thurles.
- John Dennehy gave a related talk, "Recruiting for the British army in Tipperary during 1915", for Tipperary Studies in February 2016.
- As part of Tipperary Studies' "Tipperary People & Places" lecture series, Barbara McCormack of Maynooth University delivered a talk on "The role of the Maynooth priest in World War I", focusing substantially on Kelly, in October 2018.

== Honours ==
- Military Cross (1917)
- Mentioned in dispatches
- Canon of the Archdiocese of Cashel and Emly

== See also ==
- Willie Doyle
- Willie Redmond
- 16th (Irish) Division
- Battle of Messines (1917)
- Harry Clarke
- Roman Catholic Archdiocese of Cashel and Emly
