= Killenaule =

Town in County Tipperary, Ireland

Killenaule Irish: Cill Náile
- Town
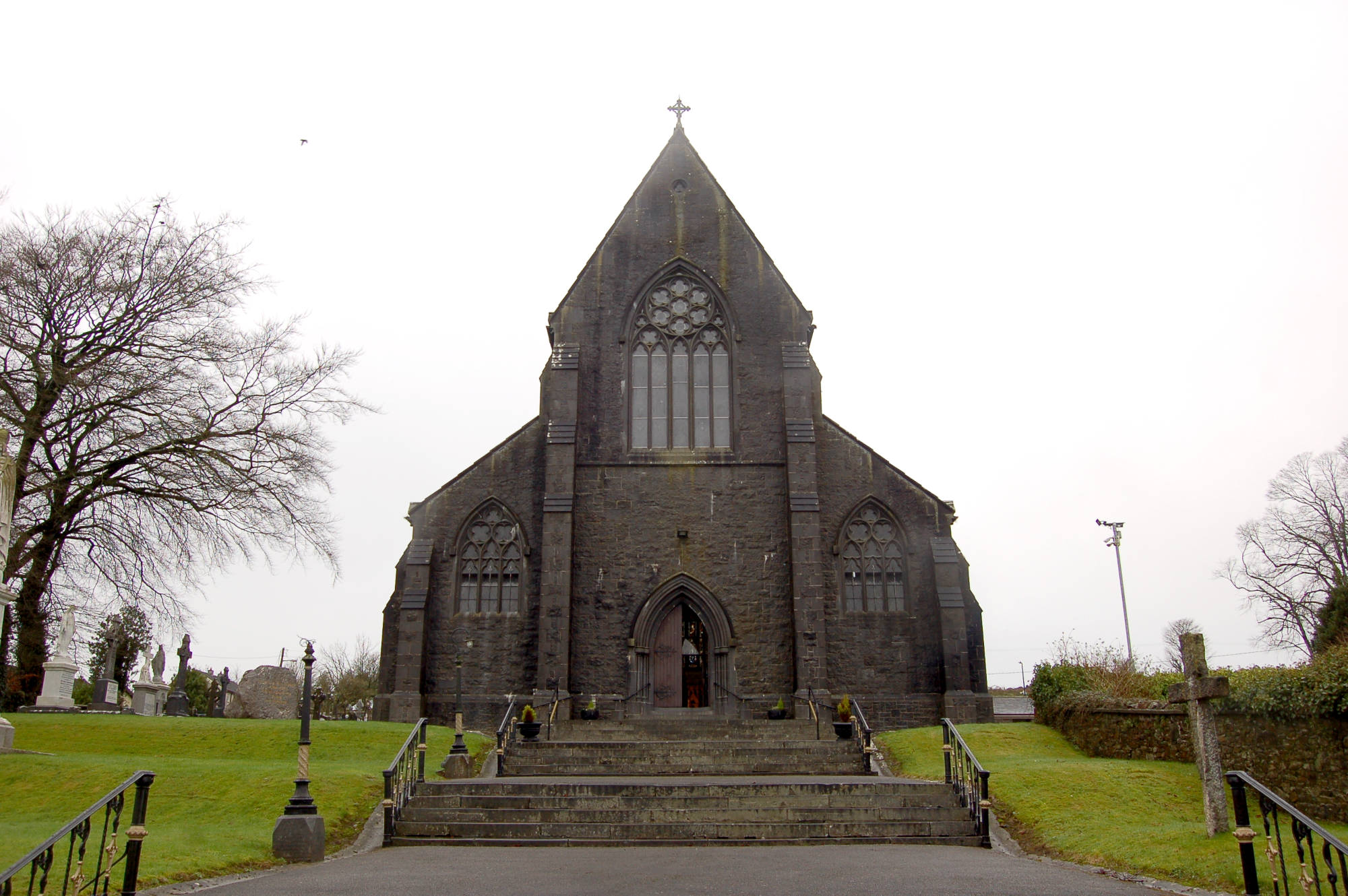
- St Mary's Church, Killenaule

- Location in Ireland
- Coordinates: 52°34′06″N 7°40′24″W
- Country: Ireland
- Province: Munster
- County: County Tipperary
- Elevation: 169 m (554 ft)

Population (2022)
  - Total: 755
- Time zone: UTC+0 (WET)
  - Summer (DST): UTC-1 (IST (WEST))
- Irish Grid Reference: S221464

Killenaule (Irish: Cill Náile) is a small town and civil parish in County Tipperary, Ireland. It is part of the ecclesiastical parish of Killenaule and Moyglass, in the Roman Catholic Archdiocese of Cashel and Emly, and the barony of Slievardagh. It is 19 km (12 mi) east of Cashel on the R689 and R691 roads, at the south-western edge of the Slieveardagh Hills.

== History ==
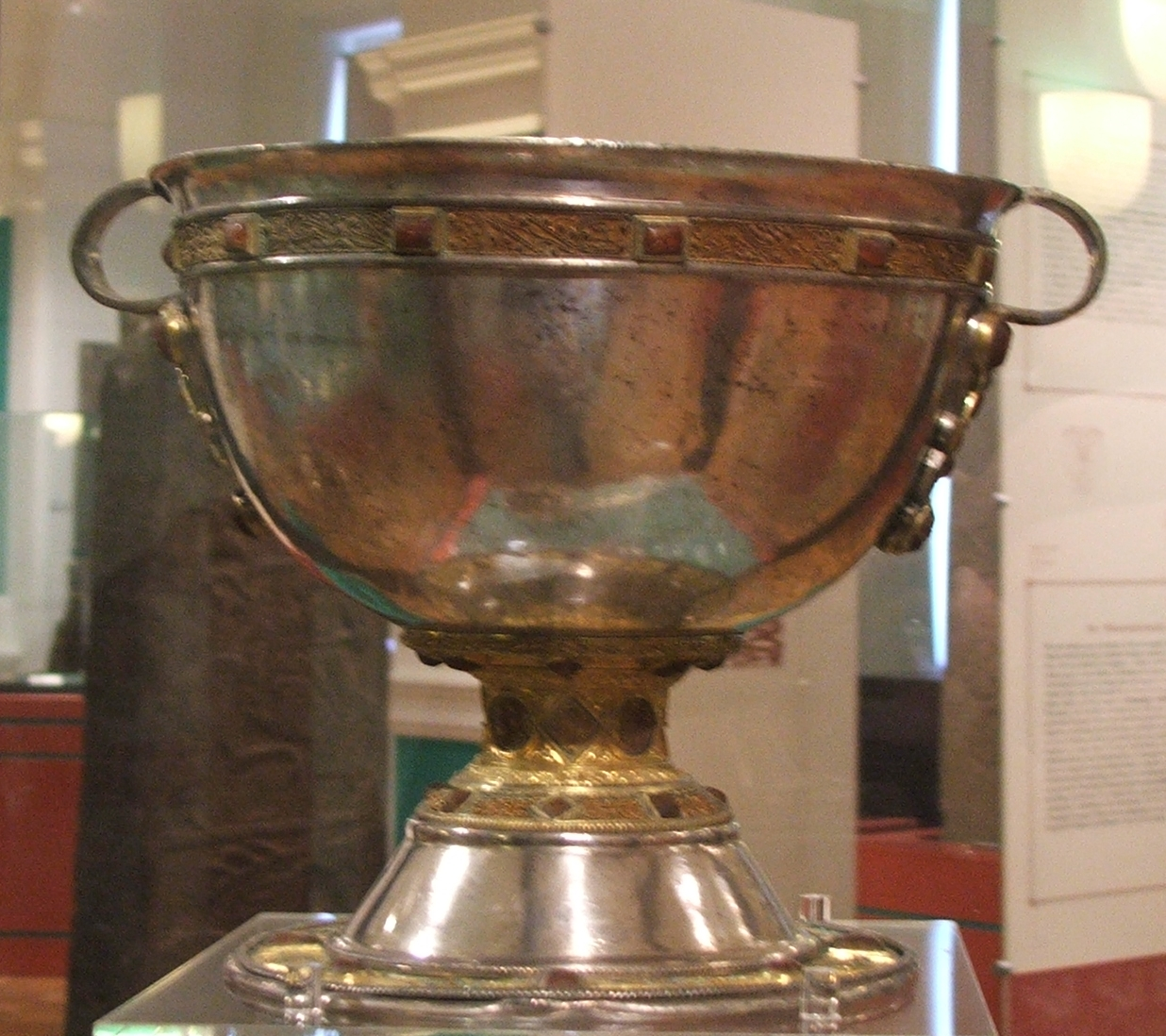
Derrynaflan Chalice

Killenaule came to national prominence in Ireland due to the discovery of the Derrynaflan Chalice. It was discovered at Derrynaflan Island in 1980 by Michael Webb and his son. They were scanning the area with a metal detector, then a relatively new device for hobbyists. The chalice was part of the Derrynaflan Hoard, consisting of an 8th-century chalice, a strainer or ladle and a paten. They were enclosed in a bronze basin buried 45 cm below ground and found about 20 metres from a church ruin.

== Demographics ==
In the decade between the 1996 and 2006 census, the population of Killenaule decreased by 17.6% – from 725 to 597 people. In the following decade, between the 2006 and 2016 census, the population increased – to 652 people. As of the 2022 census, Killenaule had 755 inhabitants.

== Sport ==
The local Gaelic Athletic Association club, Killenaule GAA, fields teams in both hurling and Gaelic football.

== People ==
- Rachael Blackmore (b.1989), jockey, is from Killenaule.
- David Power Conyngham (1825–1883), journalist, war correspondent, and novelist
- Patrick Feehan (1829-1902), first Archbishop of Chicago, Illinois
- Canon Edmond Kelly (1874-1955), Parish Priest of Killenaule from 1934 to 1955.

== See also ==
- List of towns and villages in Ireland
