= Electoral results for the Division of Mernda =

Australian division election results

This is a list of electoral results for the Division of Mernda in Australian federal elections from the division's creation in 1901 until its abolition in 1913.

== Members ==
Member	Party	Term
Robert Harper	Protectionist	1901–1909
Robert Harper	Liberal	1909–1913

== Election results ==
=== Elections in the 1910s ===
==== 1910 ====
1910 Australian federal election: Mernda
Party	Candidate	Votes	%	±%
Liberal	Robert Harper	7,917	44.1	−18.2
Labour	James Kenneally	7,280	40.6	+13.4
Independent Liberal	Thomas Hunt	1,945	10.8	+10.8
Independent	Stephen Thompson	794	4.4	+4.4
Total formal votes		17,936	97.9	
Informal votes		386	2.1	
Turnout		18,322	62.2	
Liberal hold		Swing	−2.9	

=== Elections in the 1900s ===
==== 1906 ====
1906 Australian federal election: Mernda
Party	Candidate	Votes	%	±%
Protectionist	Robert Harper	5,306	36.5	−16.5
Labour	James Kenneally	3,962	27.2	+27.2
Anti-Socialist	John Leckie	3,753	25.8	−3.0
Ind. Protectionist	Richard O'Neill	1,534	10.5	+10.5
Total formal votes		14,555	95.4	
Informal votes		702	4.6	
Turnout		15,257	52.3	
Protectionist hold		Swing	−7.4	

==== 1903 ====
1903 Australian federal election: Mernda
Party	Candidate	Votes	%	±%
Protectionist	Robert Harper	5,178	53.0	+7.7
Free Trade	Frederick Hickford	2,807	28.8	+28.8
Ind. Protectionist	Edward Hodges	1,776	18.2	+18.2
Total formal votes		9,761	98.3	
Informal votes		166	1.7	
Turnout		9,927	45.2	
Protectionist hold		Swing	+8.3	

==== 1901 ====
1901 Australian federal election: Mernda
Party	Candidate	Votes	%	±%
Protectionist	Robert Harper	2,601	45.3	+45.3
Ind. Protectionist	Thomas Hunt	2,110	37.8	+37.8
Ind. Protectionist	Sydney Stott	1,026	17.9	+17.9
Total formal votes		5,737	99.1	
Informal votes		49	0.9	
Turnout		5,786	50.7	
Protectionist win		(new seat)		
