= J. J. Kenneally =

Australian journalist and politician (1870–1949)

- Born: James Jerome Kenneally; 1870; Gaffneys Creek, Victoria, Australia
- Died: February 20, 1949 (aged 78–79); Melbourne
- Occupations: trade unionist and writer
- Spouse: Emelie Winifred Kenneally (née Deegan)
- Children: 5
- Relatives: Christine Kenneally (great-granddaughter)

J. J. Kenneally (born James Jerome Kenneally; 1870 – 20 February 1949) was an Australian journalist and trade unionist. An early populariser of Australian bushranger Ned Kelly and his gang via his book The Inner History of the Kelly Gang and Their Pursuers (1929), he was also one of the original members of the country's Labor Party and later formed his own party.

Raised in the northeastern part of Australia's Victoria known as "Kelly country", he taught school, started Tasmania's Timber Worker's Union and was active in the union movement. He ran for the House of Representatives seat for Mernda, Victoria in the 1906 and 1910 elections.

He self-published Inner History in 1929, and the work was plagiarised by the press of the day. Twenty years later, it inspired Sidney Nolan's important Ned Kelly series of paintings and, by 1980, over 30 years after Kenneally's death, it had gone through nine editions. The book continues to be referenced as a significant work into the 21st century.

== Early life and career ==
Born in Gaffneys Creek, Victoria, he was the youngest of the Kenneallys of Goomalibee, Benalla, Victoria who were originally from Ireland; his older brother Matthew (1857–1937) was born there. James studied at McCristal's College in Benalla and became a schoolteacher, later an auctioneer then an agent.

== Political career ==
He was active in the union movement, and started Tasmania's Timber Worker's Union. He was one of the original members of the country's Labour Party (ALP). He ran for the House of Representatives seat for Mernda, Victoria in the 1906 and 1910 elections. He won 41% of the vote in the latter election, but lost to Robert Harper of the Commonwealth Liberal Party, who was less than 4 points ahead. He then served as a federal organiser for woodworkers via his position as general secretary of the Sawmill and Woodworkers Association of Tasmania then formed his own party.

== The Inner History of the Kelly Gang ==
=== Content ===
For his 1929 book, Kenneally put together police statements made under oath at the time of the Kelly break-out and the events leading up to it, with the findings of the 1881 Royal Commission of Inquiry into the Victorian Police. Many of the policemen involved in the saga were subsequently demoted and pensioned off or, in the case of Constable Fitzpatrick, the constable whose initial charges against members of the Kelly family ignited the war between the Kellys and the police, dismissed. He also interviewed Tom Lloyd, a Kelly cousin and so-called fifth member of the Kelly gang, whose information was previously unpublished, such as the whereabouts of the gang when they were in hiding, the manner in which the gang approached Jerilderie (crossing the Murray River at Burramine, New South Wales, arriving from the south instead of from some other direction,) for example. He also incorporated fresh statements from others like William Williamson, whom with Kelly's mother and infant sister, was wrongfully arrested after the Fitzgerald incident and witnesses like Aaron Sherritt's young wife and mother-in-law, Mrs. Barry, who were present at Sherritt's killing, and James Reardon and his wife, and members of the police force who were present at Glenrowan from the commission testimony.

Kenneally profiled the main spies for the police and their methods, the treatment of the gang's prisoners at Jerilderie, Euroa, and Glenrowan, the procedures of Supeterintendents C.H. Nicolson and Hare and Captain Standish, all charged at different times with directing the search for the Kellys before the showdown at Glenrowan,–even which members of the police merited the Kellys admiration. Finally, he also established the difference between Kate Kelly and her older sister Margaret Kelly (Mrs. Skillion) and Steve Hart when the police could not and the press at the time did not: Ned Kelly had a total of five sisters.

His author profile in The Inner History of the Kelly Gang describes Kenneally growing up "alive to the reactions of the people who lived in the Kelly country" and "to the treatment to which the Kelly family was subjected": The book was his life's project. It was also one of the first sympathetic accounts of the Kelly Gang, and Kenneally believed it to be the first impartial one). It ends with reviews by Ned's sole surviving brother, Jim, then-aged 70, and a cousin, James Ryan, whose brother Joseph, was one of the 22 held for nearly four months without trial in 1879 for being an alleged Kelly sympathiser.

=== Critical reception ===
The book was generally well received. The reviewer for the Melbourne Herald wrote that Kenneally's "facts are ably presented," noting "most of his evidence is drawn from official sources—police evidence—showing the conduct of the constables and their immediate superiors in a very poor light." The reviewer for the Franklin and Somerville Standard wrote that Inner History makes "fairly good reading, especially to those whose only knowledge of the gang has been derived from folk tales and the reading of previous works of fiction founded on fact." His one criticism was that although the author seemed determined "to paint every action of the police as black as possible," the book throughout "has the ring of truth."

=== Copyright infringements ===
The book was plagiarised twice by J.M.S. Davies in 1930, the year after its publication, in serialised accounts of the Kelly Gang for Adelaide's Register News-Pictorial and for the Melbourne Herald. Kenneally had writs from the Supreme Court issued against both papers' publishers, and the latter were forced to pay him compensation. The Herald again managed to ignore Kenneally's copyright four years later in its publication of Roy Bridges' centenary history of Victoria and was again forced to pay Kenneally for breach of copyright.

== Book's legacy ==
The book is now viewed as "a major contribution" to the understanding of Ned Kelly and early editions are prized by collectors. It has gone through nine editions: two self-published, six by four different Melbourne-based publishers, and one by Victoria's Standard Newspapers.

Sidney Nolan, one of Australia's most iconic painters, used the book as inspiration for his famous 1946–47 Ned Kelly series. The series of 27 paintings including The Trial, at the National Gallery of Australia, feature the now-iconic figure of Kelly as his black iron helmet.

The book appears prominently in the bonus features section "Ned Kelly in Popular Culture" of the DVD for 2003 Ned Kelly film starring Heath Ledger. The title of Peter Carey's Booker Prize-winning novel, True History of the Kelly Gang (2000), references Kenneally's 1929 title.

== Personal life and family ==
He married Emelie Winifred Deegan of Castlemaine, Victoria on 21 January 1903, sister of Poet and author, Thomas Patrick Deegan, in the resort town of St Kilda, a Melbourne suburb. They had three sons and two daughters. He and his brother Matthew maintained a close relationship with the Kelly family: Jim Kelly, the youngest of the Kelly brothers, served as pallbearer at Matthew's funeral in 1937.

He died on 20 February 1949, in Royal Melbourne Hospital and is buried in the Fawkner Crematorium and Memorial Park. His wife died five years later, on 15 March 1954.

Science writer Christine Kenneally is a great-granddaughter, and wrote a piece about the search for Ned Kelly's skull for the New York Times in 2011, continuing the favoured family pastime.

== Books ==
- Kenneally, J.J., Report of Evidence Tendered to the Royal Commission on the Constitution of the Commonwealth: Suggesting Amendments to the Commonwealth Constitution Recommended by the Australian Labor Party. Melbourne: Labor Call Print, 1928.
- Inner History of the Kelly Gang. Dandenong, Victoria: The Kelly Gang Publishing Company, 1929. ASIN B003HFYBGY
- The Authentic Story of the Kelly Gang in Pictures. Cheltenham, Victoria: Standard Newspapers, 1955.
