= Kate Kelly (sister of Ned Kelly) =

Sister of Australian outlaw Ned Kelly (1863-1898)

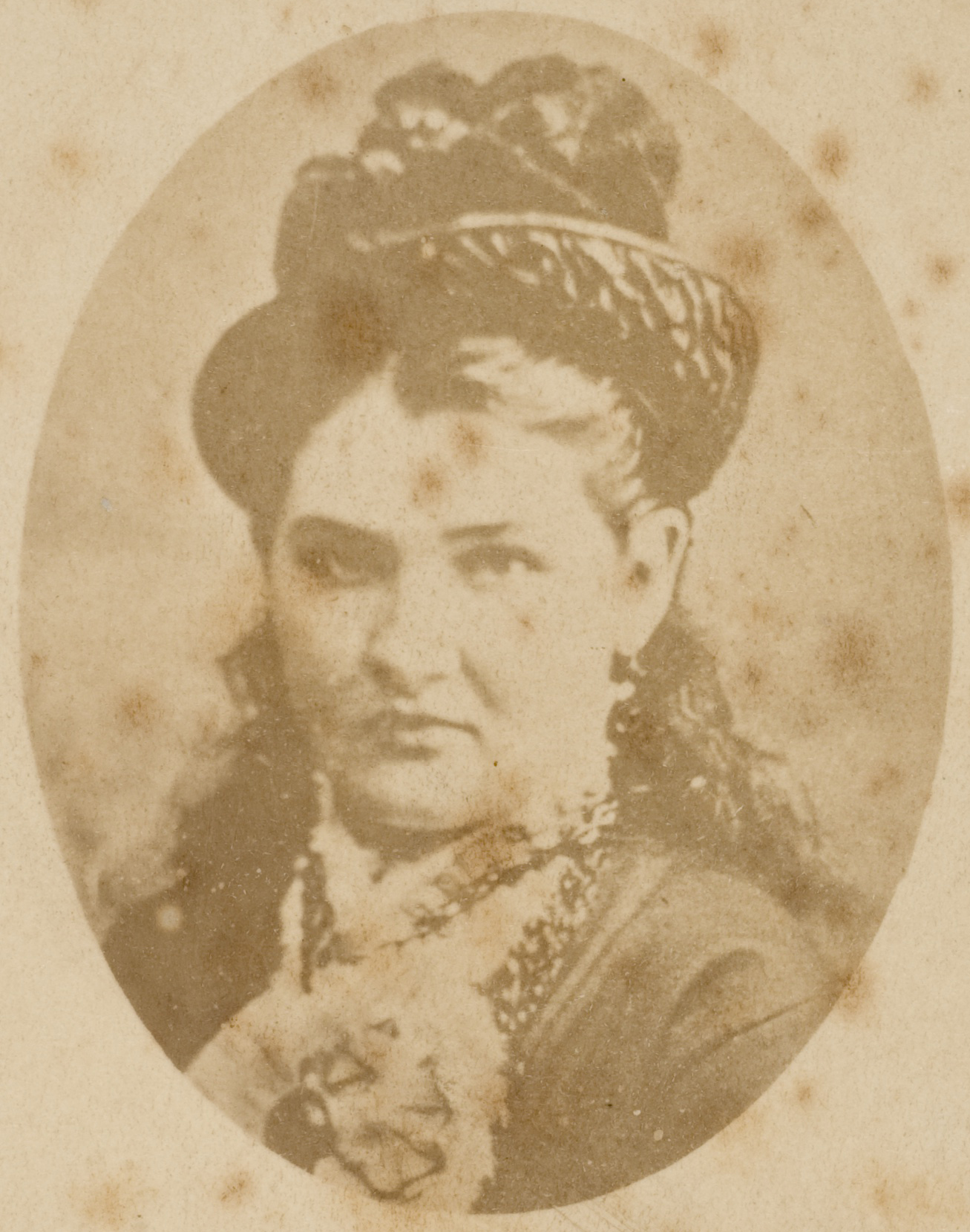
- Portrait in the State Library of NSW
- Born: Catherine Ada Kelly; 12 July 1863; Beveridge, Colony of Victoria, British Empire
- Died: October 1898 (aged 35); Forbes, Colony of New South Wales, British Empire
- Cause of death: Apparent drowning
- Parents: John Kelly (father); Ellen Kelly (née Quinn) (mother)
- Relatives: Ned Kelly (brother); Dan Kelly (brother); Tom Lloyd (cousin); Edmond Kelly (cousin)

Catherine Ada Kelly (12 July 1863 – October 1898) was the younger sister of Australian bushranger and outlaw Ned Kelly.

== Early life ==
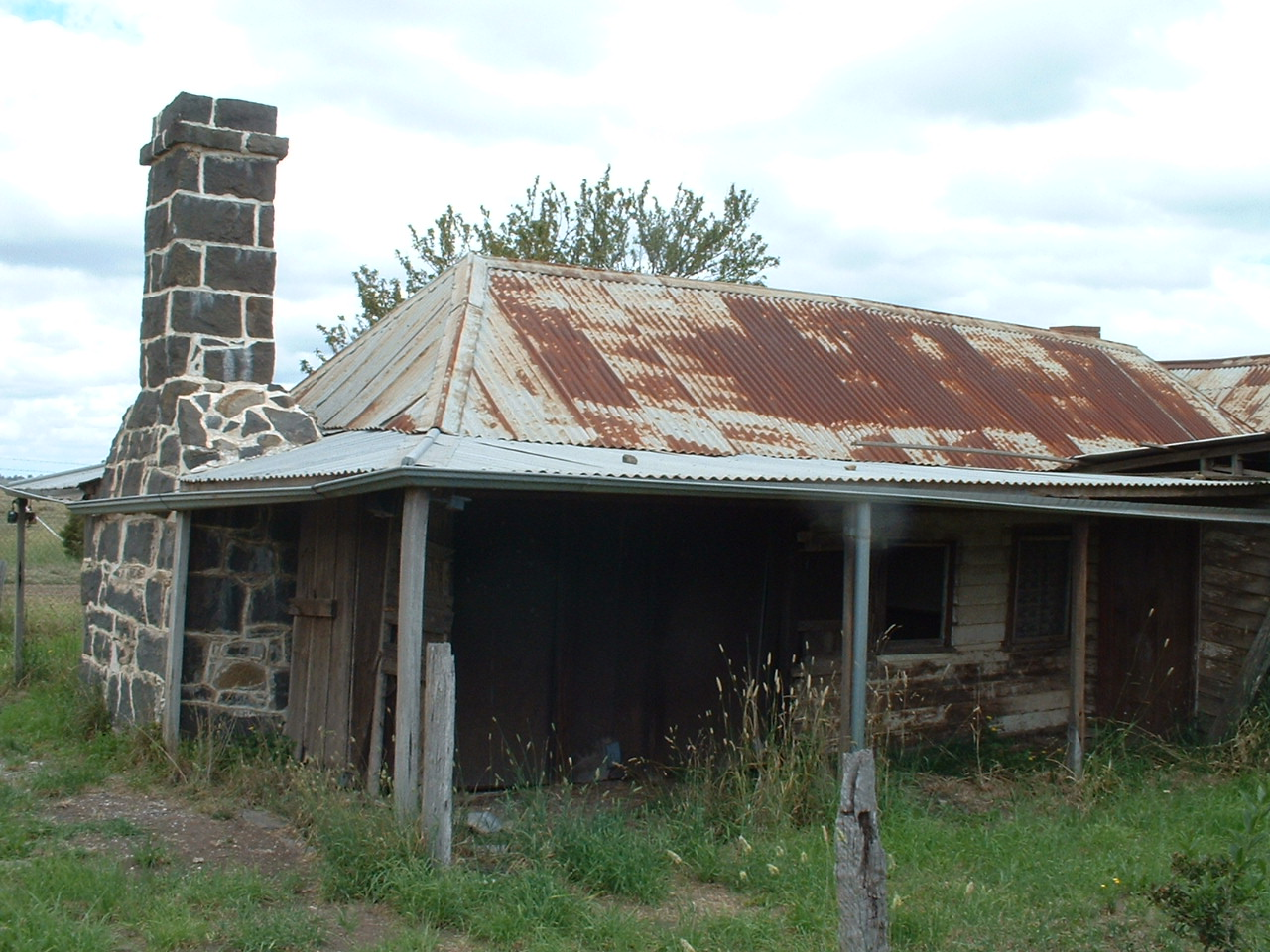
Kelly's birthplace at Beveridge, built by her father in 1859

Kate Kelly was born in Beveridge, Victoria, Australia, on 12 July 1863 to parents John "Red" Kelly and Ellen Quinn, their seventh child. The family moved to Avenel soon after her birth, where another child, Grace, was born. John Kelly died of dropsy when Kelly was four years old. Ellen Kelly then moved the family to her sisters' house at Greta.

One year later, the family moved once again, to a two-room hut on leased land at nearby Eleven Mile Creek, becoming one of the growing number of poor, Catholic and Irish born selectors in the area, limited to the marginal land that was not already claimed by wealthy squatters in the area. Kelly helped her mother bring up the family, which included three more children to her mother's second husband George King.

== The Fitzpatrick incident ==
The local police/ex-convicts paid attention to the vulnerable and widowed Ellen Kelly with small children, the Lloyds and the Quinns, persecuting those struggling families with numerous trumped-up charges.

Police in those times were mostly ex-convicts, they were scarce and a law unto themselves. In north east Victoria they took advantage of the situation and could act upon inhabitants with little or no accountability. There were very few Irish Catholics in the Greta area as most families were members of the Primitive Methodist Church who were honest hard-working families.

Ellen Kelly applied for and was granted a small 88 acre plot of marginal land. She remained on there for most of her life although she had trouble at times paying her rent as the plot was of unsustainable poor land, being too small to be viable. Her first husband, John Kelly, had died when their children were toddlers, and in that remote area she and her children were the target for ongoing police/ex-convict harassment, extortion and abuse.

Wealthy squatters held sway with land holdings taking all the best land and waterways, but the Victorian government enacted The Lands Act in 1860 granting land on generous terms to settlers. The act was used by squatters, but by 1869 the matter was settled in favour of some more influential settlers.

Across the vast spaces of the colony, livestock was frequently stolen by vagrants, those on the way to mines or diggings, or even police with their own ex-convict connections. In north-eastern Victoria, Stock Protection Leagues were established by stock owners. When there were stock thefts, the police found it convenient to frame the junior Kelly's rather than "find" the real culprits. Rewards were paid to police when arrests were made. Easy money was to be made. Charges that police perjured themselves to gain convictions were conveniently and unsurprisingly overturned by a Royal Commission into Victoria Police; the right appointee being placed in the role with the right given parameters, the outcome was unsurprising. The Royal Commission was held in 1881 into Victoria Police looked into that allegation. Here is their "finding":

"It may also be mentioned that the charge of the persecution of the family by the members of the police force has been frequently urged in extenuation of the crimes of the outlaws; but, after careful examination, your Commissioners have arrived at the conclusion that the police, in their dealings with the Kelly's and their relations, were "simply desirous of discharging their duty conscientiously" (well known to be false); and that no evidence has been adduced to support the allegation that either the outlaws or their friends were subjected to persecution or unnecessary annoyance at the hands of the police."

On 15 April 1878, Constable Alexander Fitzpatrick was sent to relieve the officer in charge at Greta and, on his way, he "decided" to "attend" the Kelly homestead en route from Benalla to Greta. This is despite there being an official instruction that no police officer should attend the Kelly home on their own. Fitzpatrick was aware that a warrant for horse stealing had been issued against Dan Kelly, even though it had been proved Dan was employed by the owner to transfer the horse from one place to another. Fitzpatrick went to the Kelly home, and he stopped there with the intention of executing the warrant. On the way he stopped at the Winton Hotel and had been drinking. This was later confirmed by the hotel owner. Fitzpatrick did not have any warrant in his possession, but it was allegedly not necessary to produce the warrant at the time.

Fitzpatrick located Dan Kelly with the intention of arrest with no warrant, and Fitzpatrick required Mrs. Kelly to provide a meal before taking Dan to Greta. Fitzpatrick demanded that Kate Kelly, Ned's sister, who was 14 at the time, should serve him the meal, and sexually assaulted her. Dan had wrestled with him to defend his sister, and the drunken Fitzpatrick's own gun in the commotion went off injuring Fitzpatrick in the wrist. Ned Kelly was later proven to be many miles distant at the time, but this was no hindrance to Fitzpatrick creating a good cover story for his drunken infringements and assault.

During Ned Kelly's trial in Melbourne, Senior Constable Kelly 'verballed' the seriously injured Ned Kelly, who subject to police brutality after he had been captured at Glenrowan, and the following was fabricated:

“Between 3 and 6 the same morning had another conversation with prisoner (Ned Kelly) in the presence of Constable Ryan. Gave him some milk-and-water. Asked him if Fitzpatrick’s statement was correct. Prisoner said, “Yes, I shot him.”

He was interviewed by a journalist from the Age.

“Reporter: Now Kelly, what is the real history of Fitzpatrick’s business? Did he ever try to take liberties with your sister Kate?” Kelly: No that is a foolish story. If he or any other policeman tried to take liberties with my sister, Victoria would not hold him” (The Age, August 9, 1880)

While William Williamson was in gaol for this offense he was interviewed by The Chief Commission of Victoria Police. Williamson confirmed what Fitzpatrick said was true. Naturally, he had no alternative but to say what the police required.

The incident stemmed from an alleged offence of horse stealing that never went anywhere. The other man alleged to have taken the livestock with Dan Kelly, was later released without charge. These fabricated police charges evaporated, but there was no justice for the Kelly's, much else was being created.

Fitzpatrick returned to Benalla and received medical treatment, a minor injury to his hand/wrist. The next day Ellen Kelly along with William Williamson and William Skillion were arrested and charged with being accessories to attempted murder of Constable Fitzpatrick. They were found guilty and Ellen Kelly was sentenced to 3 years gaol, with Williamson and Skillion each getting 6 years. The sentence was widely considered to be excessive. There were mass public demonstrations against it. The sentences were delivered by Sir Redmond Barry who later sentenced Ned Kelly to death.

Fitzpatrick had given evidence at the trial of Ellen Kelly who was charged with being an accessory to the fake "attempted murder" of (trying to defend her 14-year-old daughter from him) Fitzpatrick. A handpicked jury 'found' her guilty despite no evidence. The spite and abuse of official power knew no bounds. Fitzpatrick's statement of the events was "claimed" to have been corroborated by William Williamson while in jail i.e. Williamson had no choice but to say what police required, when interviewed by Captain Standish, the Chief Commissioner of Police, according to evidence by Standish at the Royal Commission into the Kelly Outbreak, in 1881. Note: This convenient hearsay, unsubstantiated 'evidence' was later denied by Williamson.

In his first meeting with his lawyer William Zincke, before his committal hearing, Kelly said "in consequence of the tyranny of the police he had been compelled to take up arms to protect his family and sisters".

Fitzpatrick was dismissed from Victoria Police whilst he was stationed at Lancefield. He was dismissed for being a drunk and perjurer. He later tried to claim instead he was dismissed for being insubordinate to his senior officer at Lancefield.

Ned and his brother Dan fled to the Wombat Ranges, where a few months later stumbled upon a heavily armed police party sent to ambush them. Ned Kelly, shot and killed Constable Lonigan, and fought off others in self-defence, Lonigan had run to a log and dropped down behind it and raised his weapon shooting at Kelly. It was then that Kelly shot at him when he moved. A police employee, Dr. Reynolds, claimed instead that Lonigan's injuries 'would have' had to have been obtained while standing.

Then Sgt Kennedy and Constable Scanlan rode into camp, and Kelly and the others were again forced to defend themselves. Kelly stated Scanlan had dismounted and fired two shots at him with a Spencer rifle. It was at this time that the government of Victoria enacted The Felons Apprehensions Act, and shortly after both Ned and Dan Kelly along with the two other unknown members of the gang at that time were declared outlaws.

With their mother in prison and their brothers on the run, young Kate Kelly and her sister Margaret looked after the younger children. These vulnerable Kelly children were constantly under attack and abuse by any passing ex-convict/policeman. Members of the Royal Commission had visited the home of Ellen Kelly, where she reported that police were regularly harassing her and her family at her home. The Royal Commission conveniently discarded the report and unsurprisingly took no further action against police alleged to be involved, who continued to act with impunity.

J. J. Kenneally writes that the police 'allegedly' mistook Kate for Steven given that women of course should have little or no horsemanship skills. They also 'mistook' Mrs Skillion (Margaret Kelly), with whom they were not acquainted, who had considerable horsemanship skills, for Kate.

Following Ned's arrest, Kelly would often attempt to visit him in prison, as well as raising money for legal fees. She joined the Society for the Abolition of Capital Punishment, which campaigned for Ned's death sentence to be changed. Kelly collected signatures for a petition of clemency and later presented them with a personal appeal to the Governor, the Marquis of Normanby. Despite the huge public outcry and vast mass public street demonstrations, all appeals for clemency for Ned Kelly were refused. Ned was hanged on 11 November 1880. The night before the execution a visibly affected Kelly appeared in a public silent vigil.

Ned Kelly was just 24 when he was hanged, and despite limited schooling, was probably a highly intellectual and articulate writer against the right of the wealthy privileged few to oppress the masses. Ned Kelly had to be silenced. In quiet dignity upon hearing his sentence, the young Ned Kelly said to Redmond Barry "I will see you where I am going, then we will see who is right and who is wrong". Three days later Redmond Barry dropped dead.

The day before his execution, Kelly had a photograph taken for his family. His mother, Ellen Kelly, was also being held at Melbourne Gaol at the time, serving a three-years sentence connected with the Fitzpatrick incident. She was allowed to see him shortly before his execution. According to one contemporary account, she told him, "Mind you die like a Kelly", although later account give slightly different versions of her words.

Kelly present at the Kelly home, with the Fitzpatrick assault upon her aged 14, being the catalyst for the escalation of poisonous police vendettas. Police/ex-convicts were used to acting with impunity. Kate had tried to seek justice for her outlawed brothers, suffered repeated incidents of police harassment and brutality at her home while her mother was in prison serving a lengthy-term, she sought Ned's clemency in a public campaign in Melbourne, to no avail, and was clearly mentally and physically exhausted by the end of 1880. An expert horsewoman and possessed of a singular style and presence, the young Kate Kelly then confronted the rest of her life, aged 17.

After Ned's execution in November 1880, Kelly and her brother Jim toured Victoria and NSW showing what newspapers of the day called "an exhibition of relics of the oppression conflicts". They gave several presentations to packed crowds until the police stopped them.

== Later life ==
Following Ned's hanging, Kelly left Victoria, travelling to Sydney and performing as "Ada" in a "Wild West Show" run by Lance Skuthorpe, and then in Adelaide under the names Ada Hennessey and Kate Ambrose. She eventually ceased performing due to ill health. She worked briefly as a barmaid at Hill Scott's Hotel in southern Adelaide, before her waning health forced her to return home. She worked as a domestic servant in Wangaratta, and a housemaid in Laceby, followed by a series of domestic service jobs around the area.

On 25 November 1888 she married a horse-tailer, William Henry Foster, and settled down in the town of Forbes. The couple had six children, though three died in infancy. Their marriage may not have been a happy one; on 20 May 1898 Foster appeared on charges of "using indecent language" while addressing his wife within the "hearing of the public" and he was fined. The couple do not seem to have lived together for the next five months, as Foster was reported to have been visiting his wife the night before her disappearance, before returning to the station he worked at. She gave birth to her sixth child, Catherine, on 7 September.

== Death ==
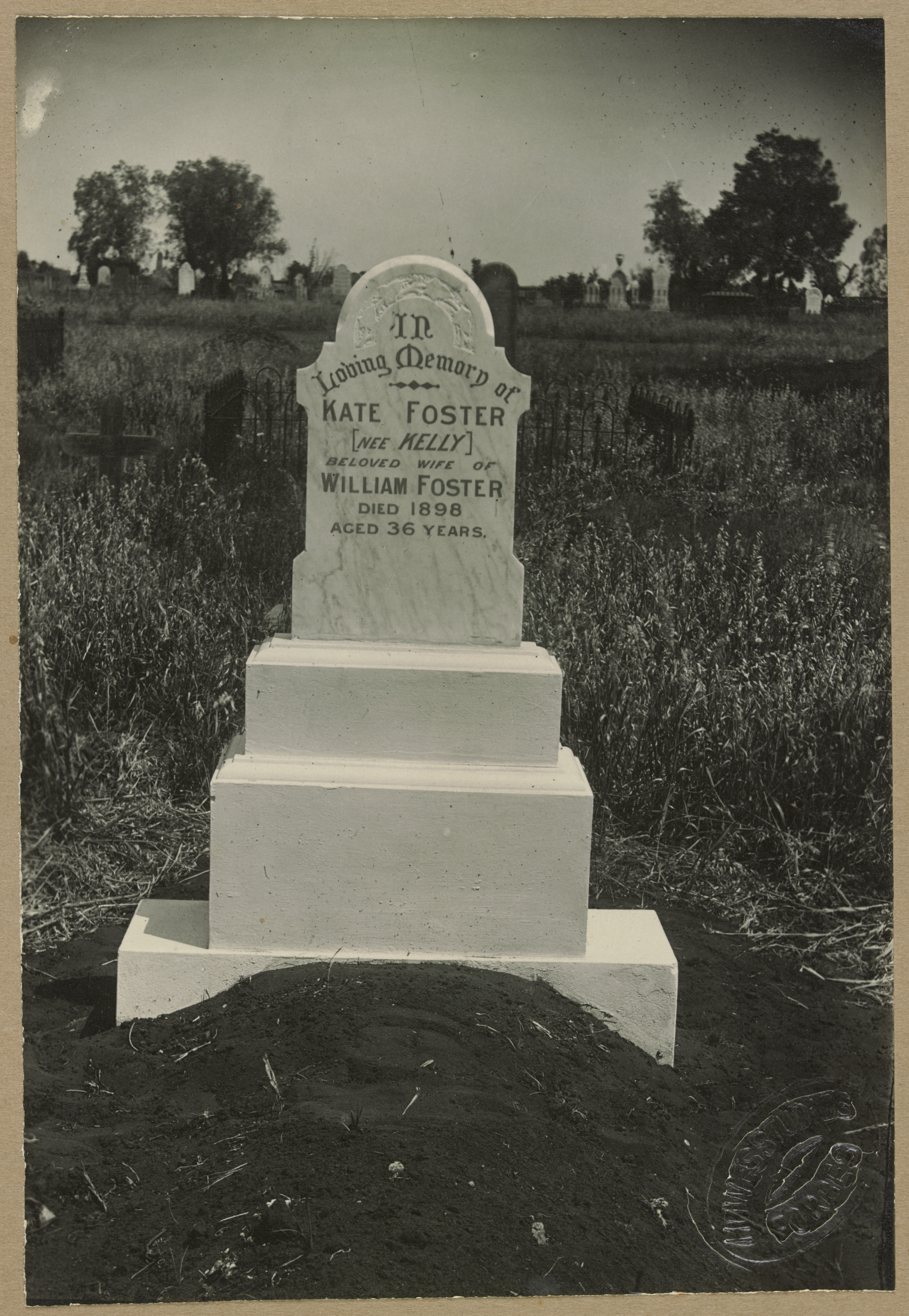
Grave and headstone of Kate Kelly

On 5 October 1898, Kelly visited a neighbour, asking her to write a message for her, and look after the children, including Catherine. The next day Kelly was reported missing, and her body was found eight days later in a lagoon on Condobolin Road near Forbes.

The doctor who examined her body said he could not determine the cause of death or any marks of violence, as the body had been in the water for eight days. The magistrate concluded Kelly died from drowning owing to no other suspicious circumstances identified. Her husband, William Foster, was convicted six months earlier for using abusive language against his wife within hearing of the public, and he was reportedly physically abusive also. There is some evidence that Kelly suffered postnatal depression and had started drinking during the day.

She was buried in Forbes Cemetery.

Her newborn daughter died a few weeks later. Her children were taken in and brought up by her mother, Ellen, and brother, Jim Kelly. Her headstone was erected around 1910, through the good graces of a former employer.

== In popular culture ==
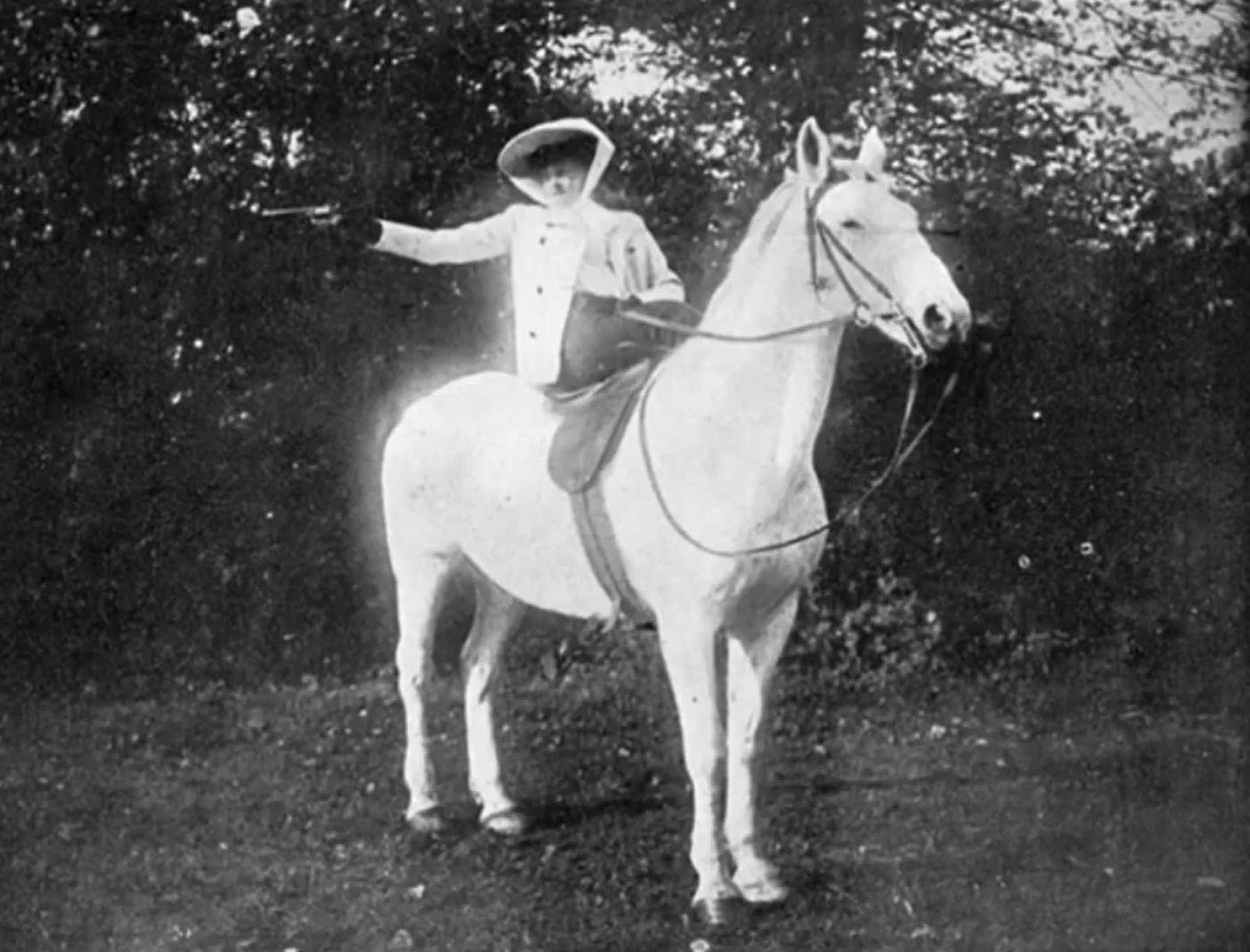
Kate Kelly depicted in The Story of the Kelly Gang (1906)

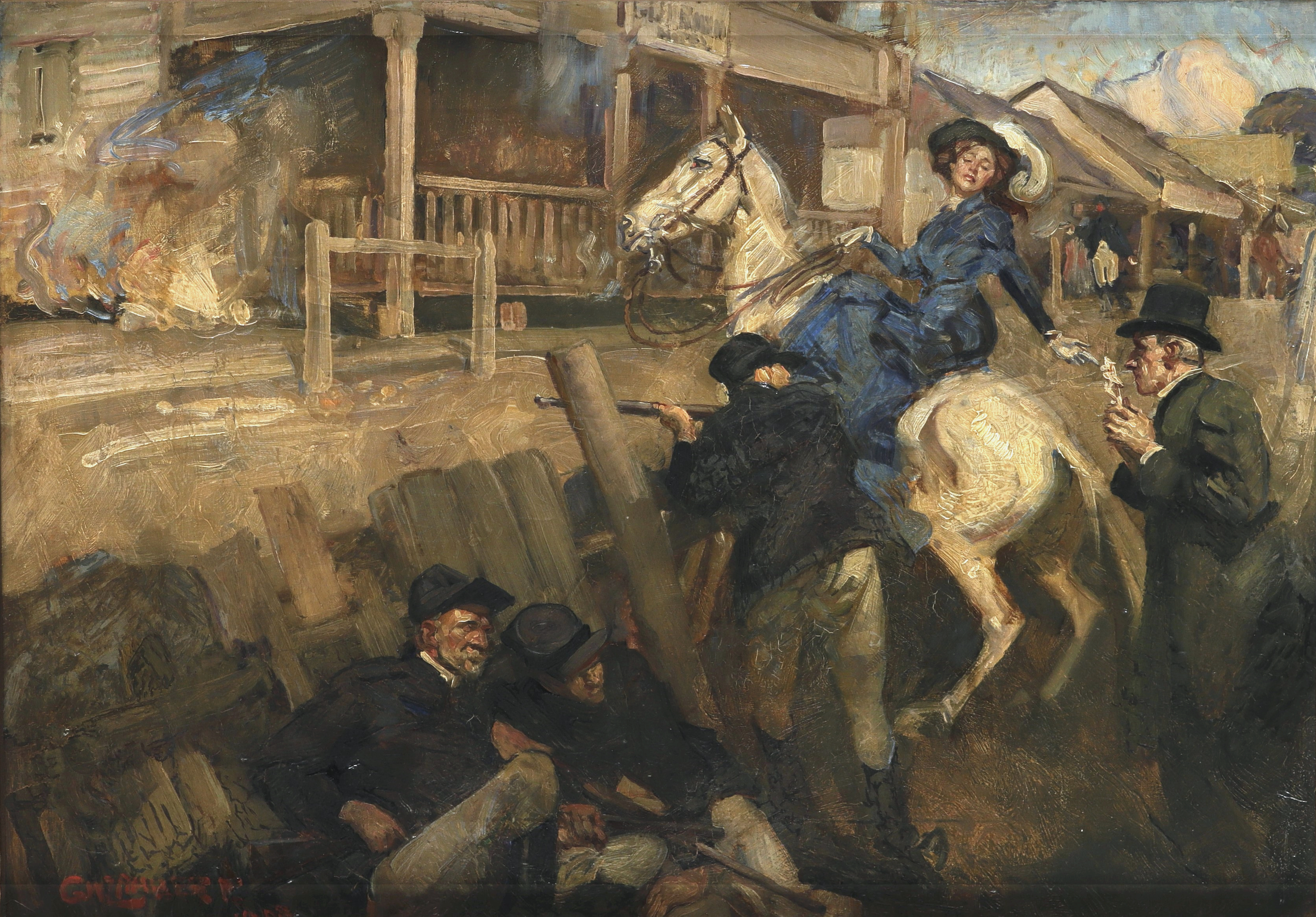
George Washington Lambert, Kate Kelly during the last stand of the Kelly Gang, 1908

The folk song "Ye Sons of Australia" includes a romanticised passage about Kate's role in the Kelly Gang;

The daring Kate Kelly how noble her mien
As she sat on her horse like an Amazon queen,
She rode through the forest revolver at hand
Regardless of danger, who dare bid her stand.

She appears in the play Ostracised, which premiered at the Melbourne's Princess Theatre a year after Ned's death. She was played by Ada Grantleigh, the lover of sex reformer and eccentric William James Chidley.

She appears in Reg Rede's 1898 play The Kelly Gang, where she was played by Dora Fotheringham.

She appears in Arnold Denham's play The Kelly Gang. In the premiere production, staged at Opera House, Sydney in 1899, she was played Ada Clyde.. According to a retrospective account published in The Sun in 1936, Kate herself was going to appear in the play, but this was vetoed by the government.

Also in 1899, Lancelot Booth's play Outlaw Kelly premiered at the Theatre Royal in Hobart. The role of Kate was played Billie Howarde.

Kate's first depiction on screen came in the 1906 silent film The Story of the Kelly Gang. Because information about the film's production is scarce, the identity of the actress who played her remains unknown. In 2006, the National Film and Sound Archive identified Lizzie Tait, a relative of the film's director Charles Tait as the stunt double for the actress.

In the 1920 silent film The Kelly Gang, she was played by Adele Inman.

In the 1923 silent film, When the Kellys Were Out, she was played by Rose Rooney.

In the 1934 film When the Kellys Rode, she was played Regena Somerville.

She was the subject of the 1946 painting Constable Fitzpatrick and Kate Kelly one of Sidney Nolan's Kelly series.

She was played by Alma Brooks in the 1951 film The Glenrowan Affair.

In the 1970 film Ned Kelly, she was played by Sue Lloyd.

She appears in the rock musical Ned Kelly: The Electric Music Show. In the original production, which premiered at Adelaide Festival Centre in 1977, she was played by Beverley Evans. In the 2026 revival produced by Victorian Opera, she was played by Chelsea Dawson.

She appears in the 1980 miniseries The Last Outlaw, played Sigrid Thornton..

In 1980, the Pram Factory commissioned and produced a musical based on Kate's stage show career entitled Ned Kelly's Sister's Travelling Circus.. The play was later renamed Kate Kelly's Roadshow, and toured around Australia from 1980 to 1981. In both the original and touring productions, the role of Kate was played by Valerie Levkowicz.

Kate is the main character in Jean Bedford's first novel, Sister Kate (1982).

Australian rock band, The Whitlams, included a song about her, "Kate Kelly" on the 2002 album Torch the Moon. She also inspired an exhibition of work from the artist Gria Shead in 2014.

In the 2003 film Ned Kelly, starring Heath Ledger, Kate is played by Irish actor Kerry Condon.

She appears in NED – A New Australian Musical. In the original 2015 production, staged at the Ulumbarra Theatre in Bendigo, she was played by Hannah Fredericksen. In the 2018 production staged at New Theatre, Sydney, she was played by Cypriana Singh.

In the 2019 film True History of the Kelly Gang, based on Peter Carey's 2000 novel of the same name, Kate was played by Josephine Blazier, while Winona Keegan played the young Kate.

In February 2021 Rebecca Wilson's biography, Kate Kelly, The true story of Ned Kelly's little sister, was published by Allen & Unwin.

The last days of Kate's life was the subject of the play Fire in the Head, written by R. Johns and staged at La Mama Courthouse in 2022.

== Revolver ==
In October 2006, an auctioneer exhibited a revolver that he stated had belonged to Kelly. It was claimed to be the revolver carried by Constable Fitzpatrick when attempting to arrest Dan at the Kelly house on the night of 15 April 1878, and which was wrestled off him by her brother, Ned. The revolver was said to have been found concealed in a wall cavity of the house in Forbes where Kelly had lived between 1888 and 1898.

The revolver was auctioned on Tuesday, 13 November 2007, where it sold to a private collector for A$72,870, narrowly beating a rival bidder representing the State of Victoria. The provenance of the revolver has since been disputed by firearms collectors, none of whom have examined the weapon first hand. The anonymous purchaser, said to have familial ties to the Kelly name, was provided with proof of origin by the auctioneers at the time of purchase.

== Stage Plays ==
- Kate Kelly's Roadshow
