= Airlie, South Yarra, Melbourne =

Historic house in South Yarra, Melbourne, Australia

Coordinates: 37°50′04″S 144°59′13″E

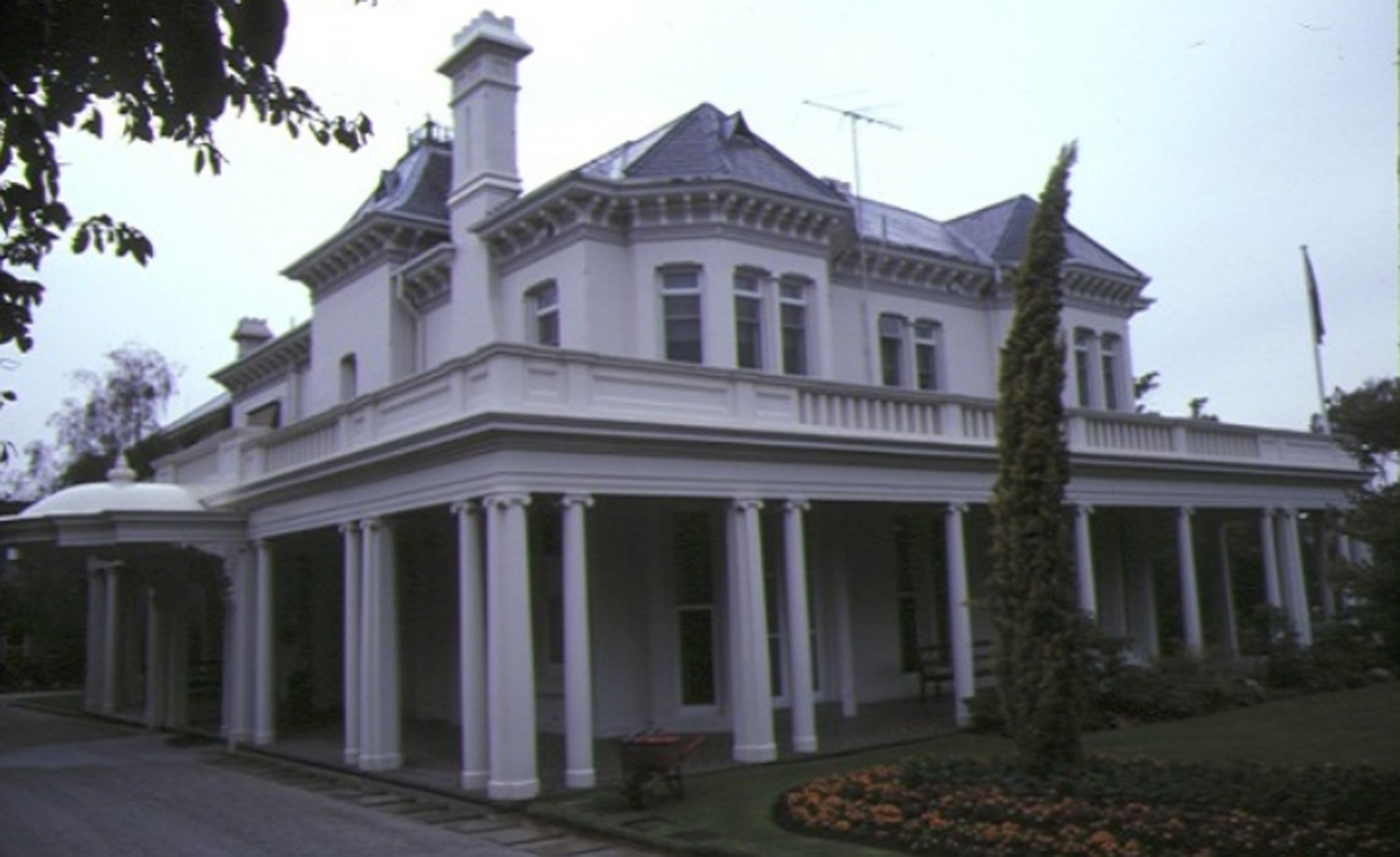
Airlie historic house, South Yarra

Airlie is a house of historical significance in South Yarra, Melbourne, in the Australian state of Victoria. It was built in 1873 by David Ogilvy and was a residence for successive owners some of whom were prominent citizens of Melbourne. During World War II it was used as the headquarters for an intelligence unit who organised secret raids against the enemy. It is now owned by the Victorian Police Department and used as a training centre and as a venue available to the public for weddings and other functions.

== David and Elizabeth Ogilvy ==
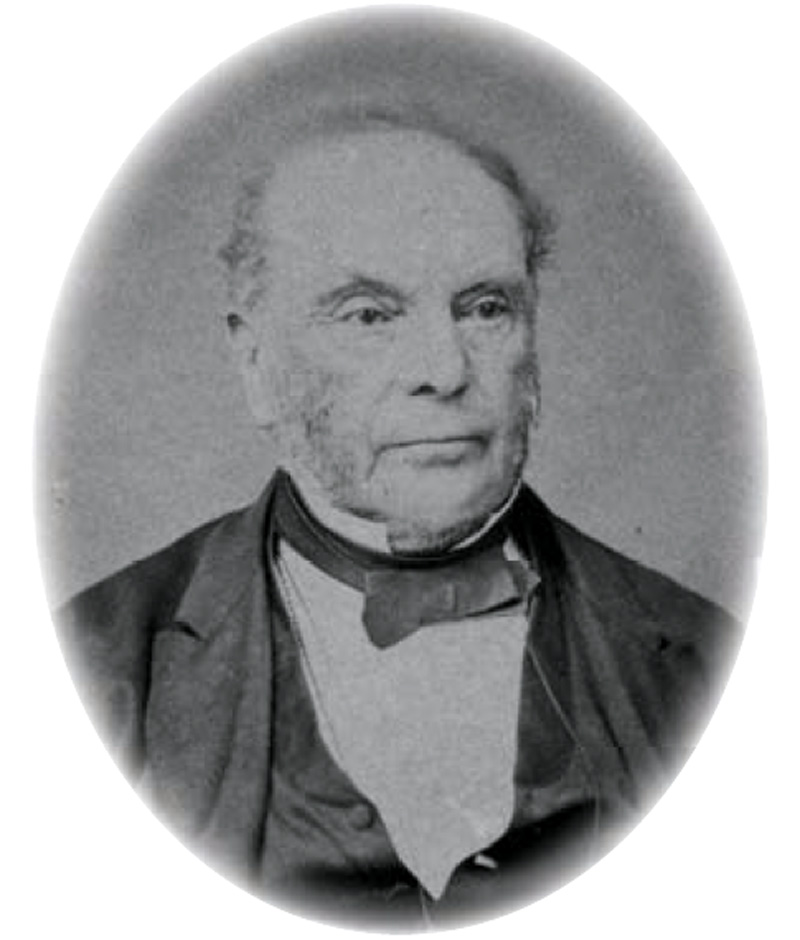
David Ogilvy circa 1860

David Ogilvy (1804–1871) was one of the pioneers of Victoria. He came from Scotland to Melbourne as a solicitor. He arrived in 1839 on the ship Superb and was accompanied by his brother William. A fellow passenger on board the ship was Elizabeth Aitchison Williamson (1815-1896) who was also immigrating to Melbourne. She was traveling with her sisters Catherine and Margaret.

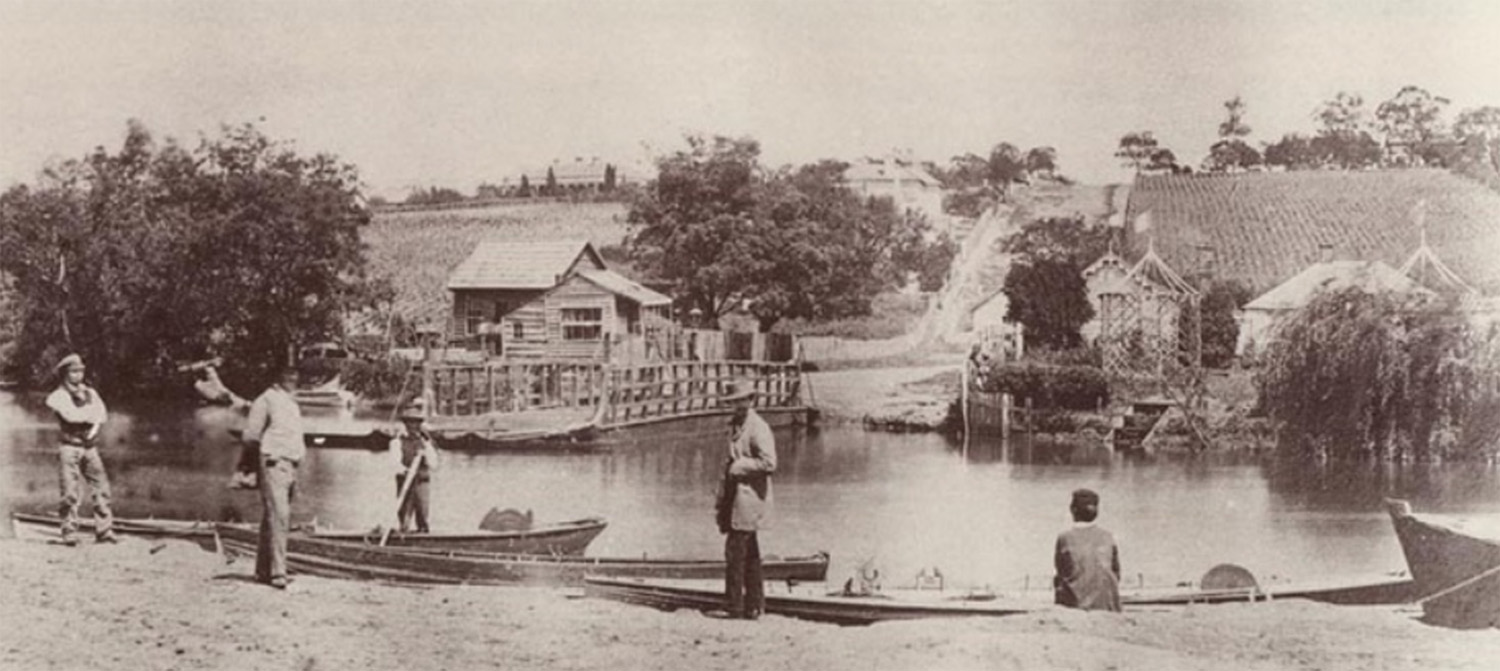
Punt Hill 1860 showing Airlie Bank Vineyard on the right.

In 1841 David and Elizabeth were married in Heidelberg. Five years later David was granted ten acres of land at South Yarra where he established a vineyard which he called Airlie Bank. They built a small cottage on the property and lived there for about 25 years. During that time the couple had seven children. David's vineyard was quite successful and the family became relatively wealthy.

David also practiced as a solicitor in Melbourne and was one of founding members of the Law Institute of Victoria. David was elected as its first President in 1859. These early members wished to establish and enforce professional standards amongst lawyers and to canvass for law reform.

In about 1870 the Ogilvys built a very large house which they called Airlie. It consisted of six bedrooms, drawing room, dining room, study, large entrance hall, kitchen, laundry, scullery, pantries and bathroom. In addition there was a coach house stables and man's room.

In 1871 David and Elizabeth with two of their daughters decided to travel to Scotland. Unfortunately David died in London before they reached their destination. He was buried in Warriston Cemetery in Edinburgh, Scotland.

Elizabeth returned to Australia in 1872 and lived on the Airlie Bank Estate until 1885 when she sold it. The purchasers of the property subdivided it and Airlie House was bought by Thomas Scarratt Hall.

== Thomas and Jane Hall ==
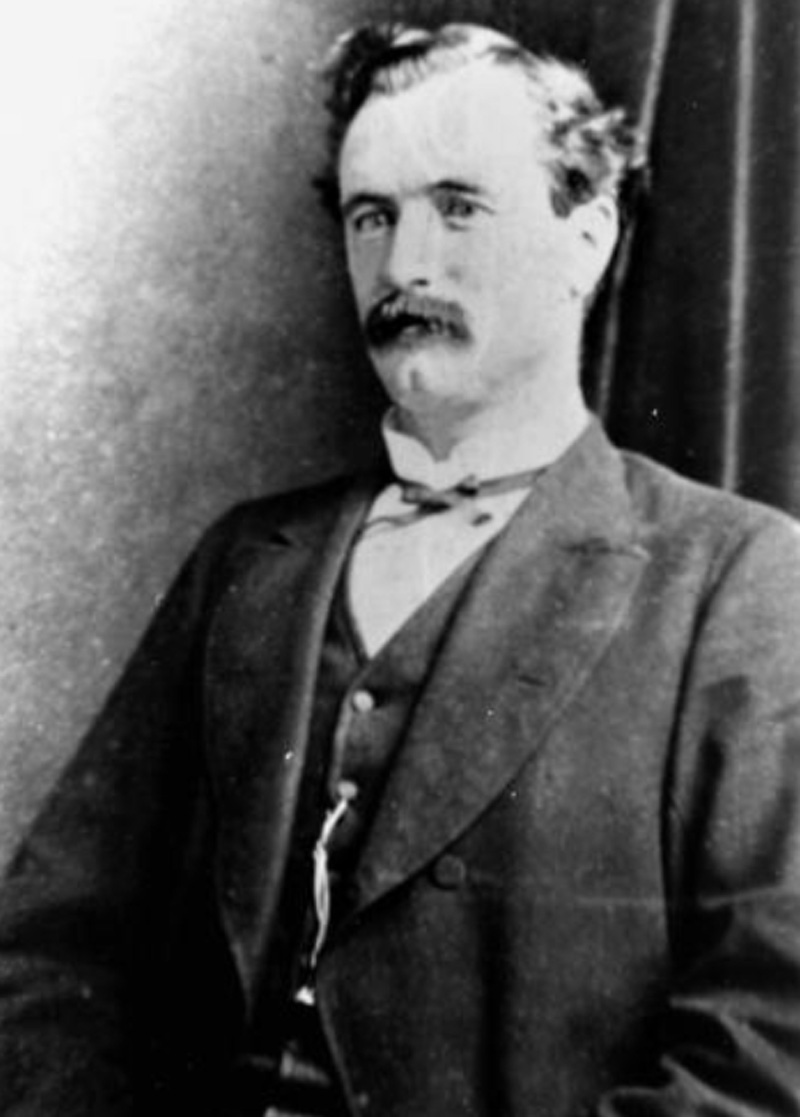
Thomas Scarratt Hall

Thomas Scarratt Hall was born in Herefordshire, England in 1836. His brother was Walter Russell Hall who later founded the Walter and Eliza Hall Institute of Medical Research in Melbourne.

Thomas and Walter came to Australia in 1852 and for some time they worked as prospectors on the goldfields of Ballarat. Thomas later went to Rockhampton and became a bank manager. He invested in the Mount Morgan gold mine which made him a very wealthy man. He later became the chairman of the mine. He invited his brother Walter to invest in the venture and it was this investment which made Walter a multi-millionaire and enabled him to become a famous philanthropist.

In 1887 at the age of 51 he married Jane Kirk who was the cousin of Eliza Rowdon Kirk. Eliza had previously married Thomas's brother Walter Russell Hall. Soon after their marriage Thomas and Jane bought Airlie and lived there for about ten years. Their three children were born there. They then decided to live in England and sold the house to George Chirnside.

== George and Annie Chirnside ==
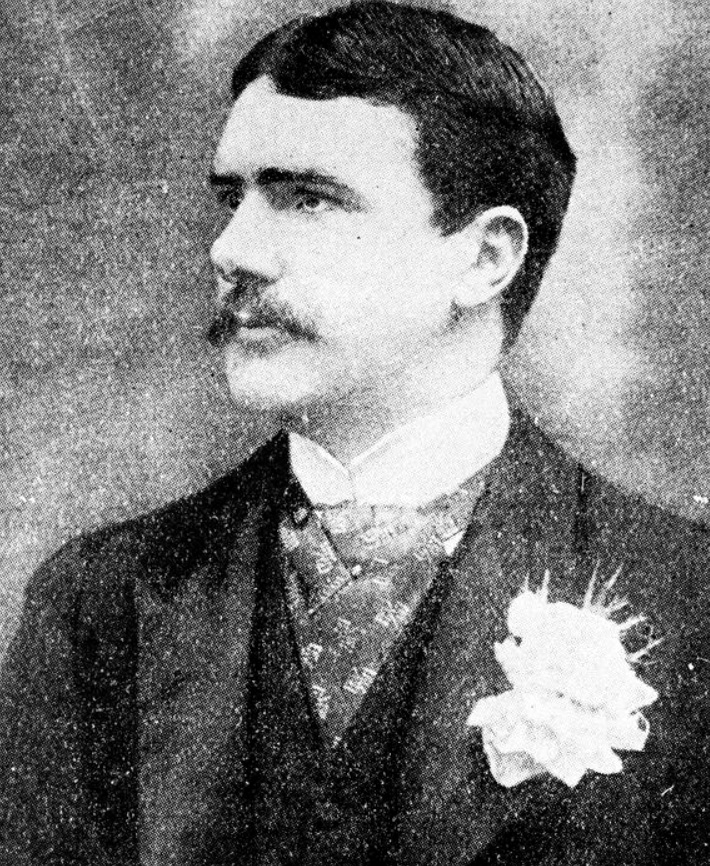
George Chirnside in his youth

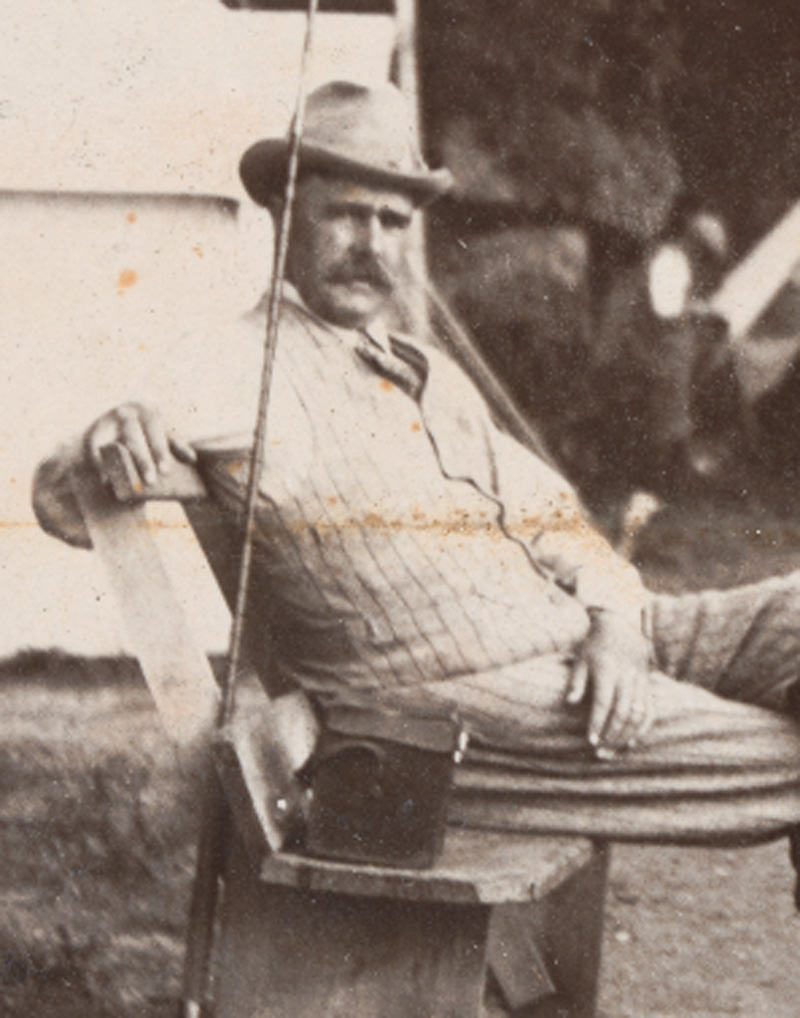
George Chirnside in later life

George Thomas Chirnside was born in 1863 on a large far, near Ballarat. His father was Andrew Chirnside who with his brother Thomas developed the very rich estate of Werribee Park near Melbourne. In his youth George led the life of a young heir helping his father develop his properties and indulging in sporting activities such as hunting and polo.

At the age of 25 George married Annie Ida Watson who was the daughter of Samuel Watson, a prosperous grazier in New South Wales. Her sister Blanch married one of the Armytages of Como in Toorak. George and Annie's wedding was a very lavish affair and was widely reported in the newspapers. The following is an account from the Australian Town and Country Journal.

“The marriage of, Miss Annie Ida Watson (second daughter of the late Mr. Samuel Watson of Gerogery Station, N.S.W.), with Mr. George T. Chirnside, third son of Mr. Andrew Chirnside, of Werribee Park, Victoria, was solemnised in Christ Church, South Yarra, on the 21st inst. in the presence of a large assemblage of the representatives of fashionable society in Melbourne. The marriage being regarded as one of the premier celebrations of the season. The bride entered the church on the arm of her brother; the bridegroom being already at the altar with his brother, Mr. J Percy Chirnside, who acted as groomsman. The bridal robe was of ivory moire, with train, and was made in the Directoire style. The petticoat and bodice were draped with ivory crepe de chine, and caught at the high neck with a small bouquet of orange blossoms and myrtle. A wreath of the same flowers was worn under the tulle veil, and amongst the jewels worn were a lovely diamond necklet and pins, the gift of Mrs. Chirnside, of Werribee. The bride carried a handsome bouquet of orchids and bridal flowers, tied with broad, ivory ribbon."

Annie was a young socialite and when the couple first moved to Point Cook to manage one of the Chirnside estates she found it very isolated. After George inherited the Werribee Estate in 1890 the couple decided to acquire a town house in Melbourne. They rented several including Como in Toorak before they purchased Airlie in about 1900.

Annie had some very famous guests staying at Airlie during their residence there. In 1901 some of the entourage of the Duke and Duchess of Cornwell were accommodated at Airlie and in 1907 Dame Nellie Melba came to stay. George sold the property to Robert Harper in about 1915.

== Robert and Jane Harper ==
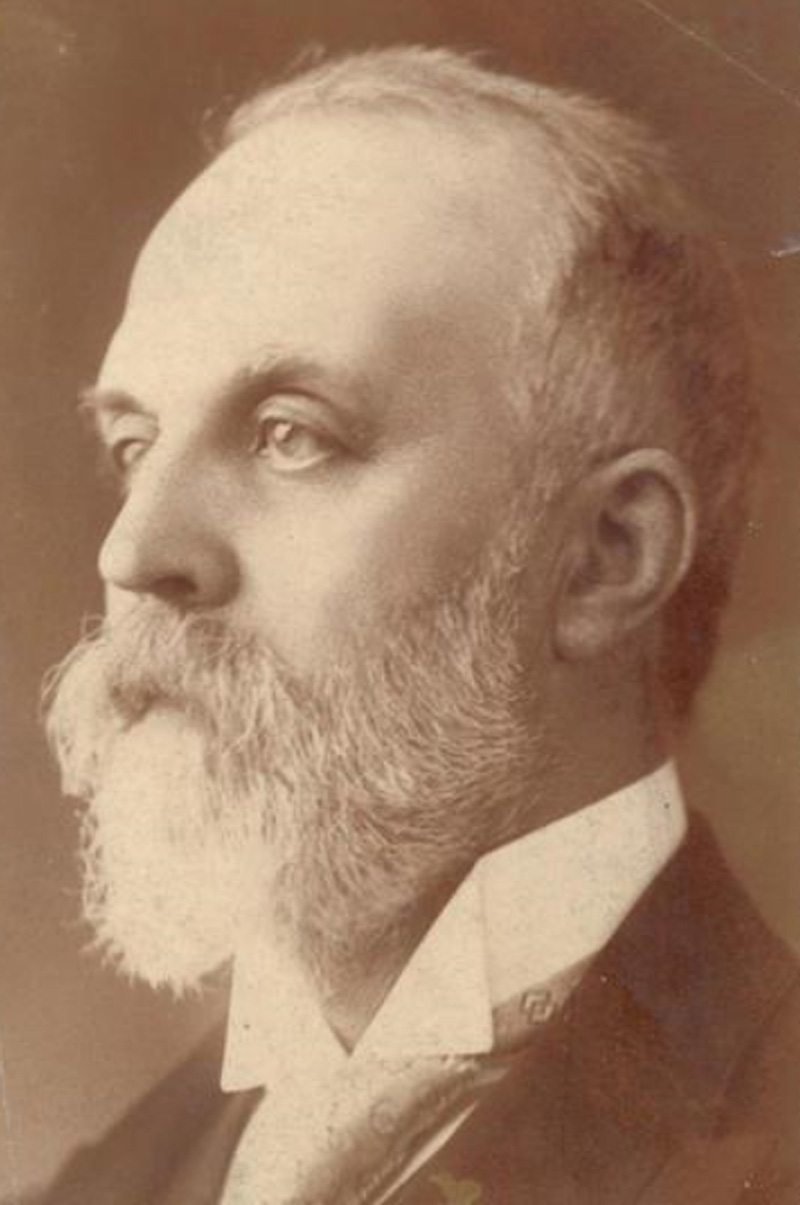
Robert Harper circa 1900

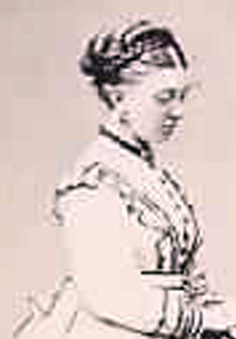
Jane Harper circa 1870

Robert Harper was born in Scotland in 1842 and immigrated to Australia with his parents at the age of fourteen. He worked for several merchants before opening his own company called Robert Harper and Co in 1865. This company became extremely successful over the years. It began trading in tea, coffee and spices from the East Indies and later diversified into other products.

In 1869 Robert married Jane Ballingall Cairns who was the daughter of the prominent Presbyterian clergyman Adam Cairns. The couple had seven children. They lived in a number of large houses in Melbourne during their married lives. Jane became a very prominent philanthropist and was the president of The Spinners Club which was a club for ladies which raised money for charity. She was also president of the Ministering Children's League and held high office in the Young Women's Christian Association, the Free Kindergarten Union and the Ladies' Work Association. In these roles she held numerous fêtes and fundraising social events and she was frequently mentioned in the newspapers of that time.

After Robert's retirement they bought Airlie in about 1915 and lived there for several years. Jane continued her charitable activities and held frequent fêtes at the house. Robert died at Airlie in 1919.

== Clive and Dorothy Leonard ==
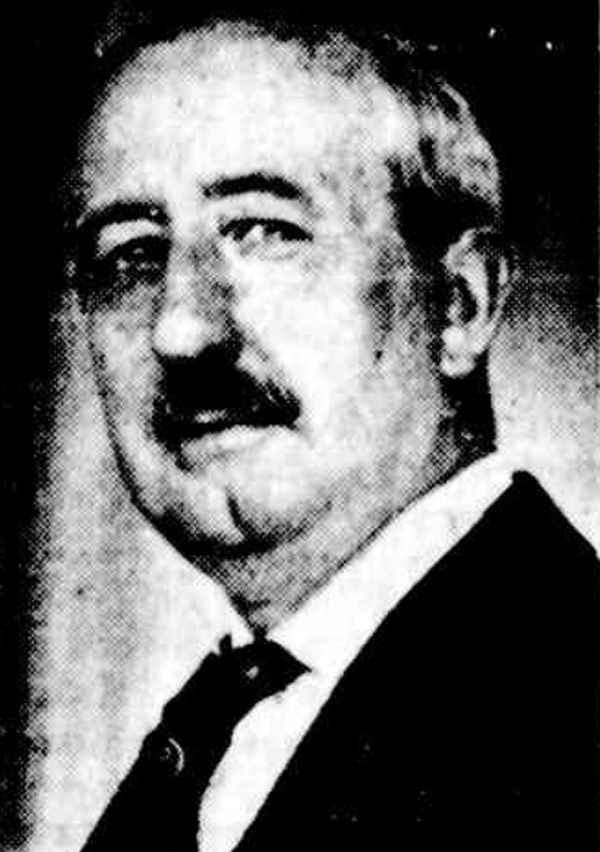
Percy Clive Leonard

Percy Clive Leonard was born in 1877 to wealthy parents William and Margaret Leonard who lived in Toorak. His father owned extensive sheep properties in Victoria. After being educated at an exclusive school in St Kilda he went to England to learn the wool trade. He returned to Australia and was involved with several wool companies. He owned successful racehorses and was for some years Chairman of the Melbourne Racing Club.

In 1914 at the age of 37 he married Dorothy Reynolds who was the daughter of the wealthy grazier Walter Reynolds of Trevallyn. The couple lived on Toorak Road, South Yarra for several years and had three children. In about 1920 they bought Airlie and lived there for about 22 years until Clive died in June 1942. After his death Airlie was taken over by the Z Special Unit of the Australian intelligence forces.

== Z Special Unit ==
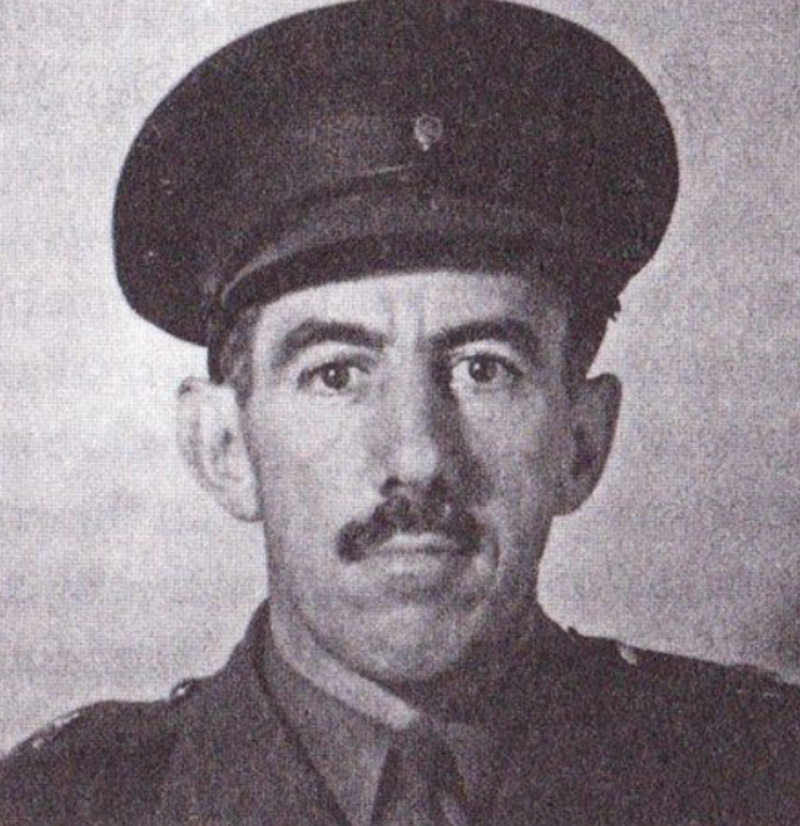
Lieutenant-Colonel Egerton Mott

At the suggestion of General Thomas Blamey special forces were trained in Australia to infiltrate enemy-controlled territory in the South Pacific using similar methods to those employed by the French Resistance. These forces were controlled by a small team called Z Special Unit headed by Lieutenant-Colonel Egerton Mott.

Mott decided to set up his control team in Airlie. A recent book described their operations in the following terms.

“It was from within Airlie's cold stone walls that Mott's team would plan and monitor missions sent into enemy territory north of Australia. Mott's team of six officers and three administrative staff included some of the best and brightest."

== Post war ==
After the war Dorothy Leonard resumed occupancy of Airlie and she lived there until 1950 when she sold it. It was bought by the Health Department who used it for several years and then taken over by the Police Department.

The Victorian Police Department used it as a training college for many years. In 2003, they established the Airlie Leadership Development Centre within the grounds. This centre is designed to develop personal, professional and leadership growth within Victoria Police. The Airlie Leadership Development Centre also offers one of Melbourne's greatest boutique heritage conference venues. Further details are available on their website included below.

The site is listed on the Victorian Heritage Register.
