= Robert Harper Building =

Heritage listed building in Fremantle, Western Australia

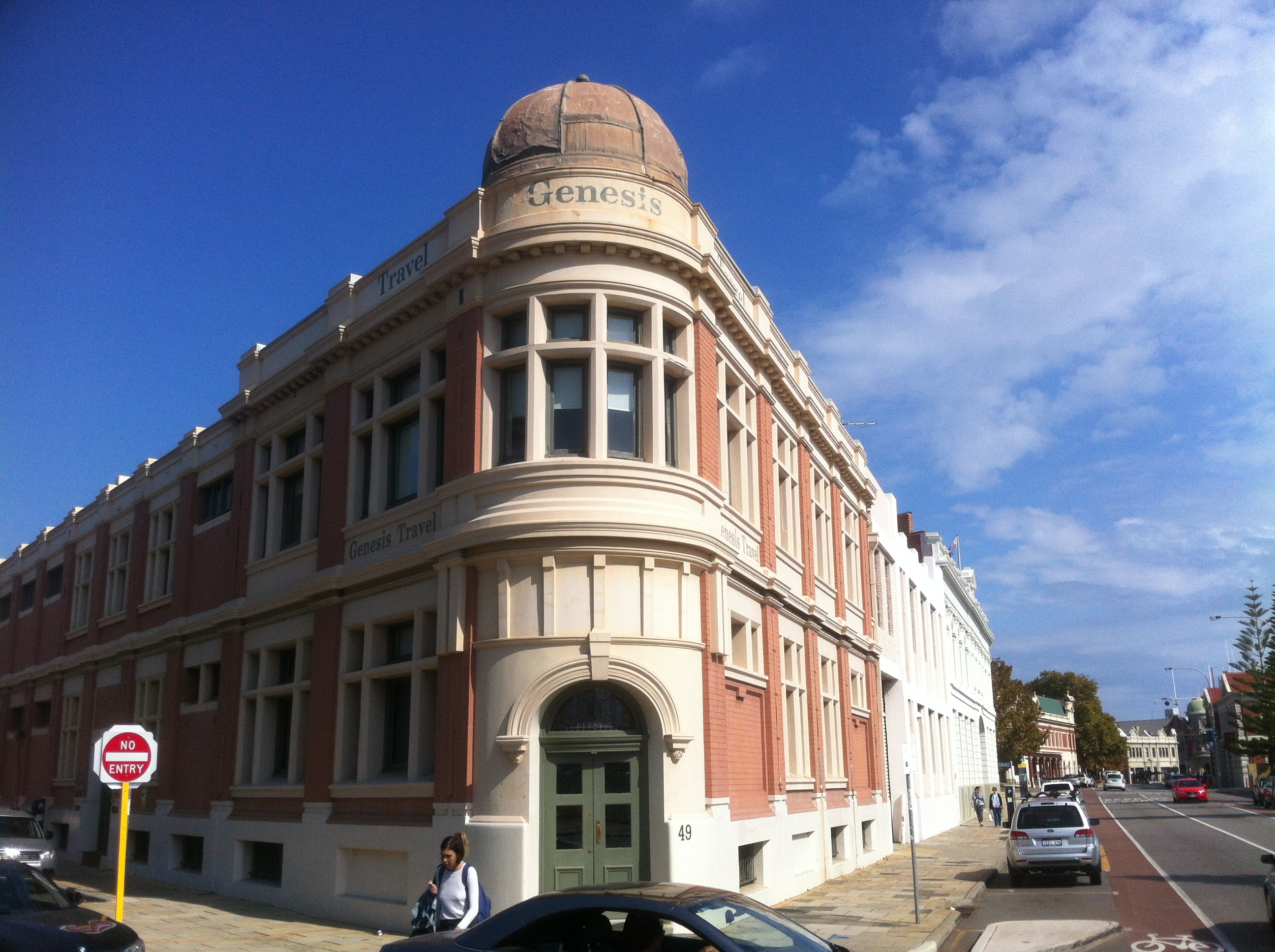
- Interactive map of the Robert Harper Building area
- Alternative names: Jebsens, Genesis Travel

General information
- Architectural style: Inter-War Stripped Classical style
- Location: 49 Phillimore Street, Fremantle, Western Australia, Australia
- Coordinates: 32°03′12.8″S 115°44′39″E
- Completed: 1890
- Renovated: 1922
- Owner: Robert Harper and Co. (first owner)

Technical details
- Floor count: 2

Western Australia Heritage Register
- Type: State Registered Place
- Part of: West End, Fremantle (25225)
- Reference no.: 984

The Robert Harper Building, also known as Jebsens, is a heritage-listed building located at 49 Phillimore Street, on the corner of Pakenham Street in the Fremantle West End Heritage area. It is one of many commercial buildings constructed in Fremantle during the gold boom period in the late nineteenth and early twentieth century.

The two storey building was constructed in 1890 for the Fremantle branch of Robert Harper and Co., a manufacturing and distribution business. It was designed in the Inter-War Stripped Classical style. It was a built with a combination of offices and warehouse space, but as of 2021 comprised only offices. There is a basement level partially below ground.

The building was gutted by fire in 1922, causing between £A 40,000 and £A 50,000, equivalent to between A$3.7 million and A$4.7 million in 2022, worth of damage.

The building was classified by the National Trust in 1974 and placed permanently on the Register of the National Estate in 1978.

In 1976 a development application was made to build a 9-storey office block on the site.

Changes were made to the facade in the 1990s with the modification of the north side entrances and windows to accommodate the warehouse area of the building being turned into office space.

== See also ==
- List of heritage places in Fremantle
