= The Kelly Gang (Denham play) =

1899 Australian play

The Kelly Gang; or the Career of the Outlaw, Ned Kelly, the Iron-clad Bushranger of Australia
- Original language: English
- Written by: Arnold Denham and others
- Subject: bushrangers
- Genre: Melodrama

Premiere
- Date: 22 July 1899
- Place: Opera House Sydney

The Kelly Gang; or the Career of the Outlaw, Ned Kelly, the Iron-clad Bushranger of Australia is an 1899 Australian play about bushranger Ned Kelly. It is attributed to Arnold Denham but it is likely a number of other writers worked on it.

== Authorship ==
The play is typically attributed to Arnold Denham, a Perth journalist who has few other credits or theatre experience. However he regularly litigated in defence of "his" copyright in the play. It is considered likely that Denham plagiarised from Reg Rede's play The Kelly Gang.

Denham died in 1922. He wrote about the play that:

The fact that four men defied the Government for two years, with a reward of £10,000 on their heads, that their extermination cost the State £115,000, and that their last stand was made in a wooden shanty within two hundred yards of a railway station, where they were opposed by a small army of police, and a field gun, seems to me as dramatic and remarkable as anything in an-cient or modern history.

== Reviews ==
Evening News said "Many of the situations... are strongly reminiscent of the dramatisation of Robbery Under Arms."

== Lawsuits ==
Denham sued for copyright infringement against the producers of other plays about Ned Kelly including Outlaw Kelly in 1899 and a different play called The Kelly Gang in 1901.

He was successful in the 1901 case. This decision was appealed unsuccessfully. It has been said "the net result was that Denham, the first pirate in New South Wales of a popular play written and staged in Victoria,21 gained the same exclusive legal rights as the original copyright holder, although this is unlikely to have occurred if the defence evidence had been properly led."

== Productions ==
According to one account Kate Kelly appeared in an original production in Sydney at the Criterion Theatre.

The play was an immediate success. The Sunday Times said "Though the production has not any very striking merit, apart from its sensationalism, the doings of 'the 'ironclad bushranger' appear to fascinate the audiences. The variety scene' at' the Glenrowan Hotel is contributed by several well-known artists, and is also fully appreciated."

The play ran for seven weeks in Sydney in 1899 then toured.

There was a revival in 1908.

A production was staged on 18 May 1907 at His Majesty's Theatre in Perth.

== Characters ==
- Ned Kelly: An outlaw, referred to as "the Terror of the North East".
- Dan Kelly: An outlaw, and the brother of Ned Kelly.
- Steve Hart: An outlaw associate of Ned, and a neighbour of the Kelly family.
- Joe Byrne: An outlaw associate of Ned, and a neighbour of the Kelly family.
- Sergeant Steele: A police trooper, and Ned's main enemy. He is based on Sergeant Arthur Steele.
- Sergeant Kennedy: A "brave and fearless" policeman. He is based on Sergeant Michael Kennedy.
- Constable Fitzpatrick: He is based on Constable Alexander Fitzpatrick.
- Aaron Sherritt: A police informer and former friend of Joe.
- Mr. Scott: The manager of the National Bank, located in Euroa. He is based on Robert Scott.
- Roberts: A clerk at the National Bank.
- McGuinness: A junior police constable. In an earlier version of the show, he was named Moloney.
- O'Hara: A junior police constable. In an earlier version of the show, he was named Murphy.
- Lonergan: A trooper. He is based on Constable Thomas Lonergan.
- Scanlon: A trooper. He is based on Constable Michael Scanlan.
- Bracken: A trooper. He is based on Constable Hugh Bracken.
- Macready Ham: A tragic actor.
- Leon: An actor and contemporary of Macready Ham.
- Mr. Curnow: A schoolmaster and newspaper correspondent. He is based on Thomas Curnow.
- Mick Mulcahy: A farmhand.
- McIntyre: A trooper. He is based on Constable Thomas McIntyre.
- Melpomone Prim: A member of the "Rush for Gold" theatre troupe.
- Father Gibney: A priest. He is based on Father Matthew Gibney.
- Mr. Jones: The landlord of Jones's Hotel in Glenrowan. In reality, the Glenrowan Inn was owned by publican Ann Jones, whom Mr. Jones likely plays the role of.
- Mrs. Kelly: The mother of Ned, Dan, and Kate Kelly. She is based on Ellen Kelly.
- Lucretia Aspen: A "giddy" 60-year-old.
- Mary Byrne: The sister of Joe Byrne.
- Kate Kelly: The sister of Ned and Dan Kelly, called "the Pride of the Forest".
- Martin Cherry: A crippled individual. He is based on an individual of the same name.
- Mr. Brown: The manager of the bank in Jerilderie.
