= Division of Mernda =

Former Australian federal electoral division

Mernda Australian House of Representatives Division
- Created: 1901
- Abolished: 1913
- Namesake: Mernda

The Division of Mernda was an Australian electoral division in the state of Victoria. It was named after the town of Mernda, now a suburb in the City of Whittlesea in the northern suburbs of Melbourne. The division was proclaimed in 1900, and was one of the original 65 divisions to be contested at the first federal election.

When the division was created, it originally included the towns of Lilydale and Mitcham (now suburbs), towns in the Yarra Valley area, and the towns of Seymour, Yea. It was redistributed on 13 July 1906 to include the towns of Gisborne and Kyneton, replacing the abolished Division of Corinella. It was abolished at the redistribution of 1 February 1913, replaced by other divisions such as:

- Division of Corio (majority of the old Division of Mernda, including Gisborne, Epping, Whittlesea and Wallan)
- Division of Bourke (Thomastown, Watsonia and Eltham)
- Division of Maribyrnong (Broadmeadows and surrounding area)
- Division of Echuca (Wandong, Broadford and Seymour)
- Division of Flinders (Lilydale and Yarra Valley areas)
- Division of Indi (Yea and Alexandra)
- Division of Grampians (Kyneton and Woodend)

== Members ==
Image	Member	Party	Term	Notes
	Robert Harper (1842–1919)	Protectionist	29 March 1901 – 26 May 1909	Previously held the Victorian Legislative Assembly seat of East Bourke. Retired after Mernda was abolished in 1913
	Robert Harper (1842–1919)	Liberal	26 May 1909 – 23 April 1913	Previously held the Victorian Legislative Assembly seat of East Bourke. Retired after Mernda was abolished in 1913

== See also ==
- Electoral results for the Division of Mernda
