= Adam Cairns =

Scottish-Australian minister (1802–1881)

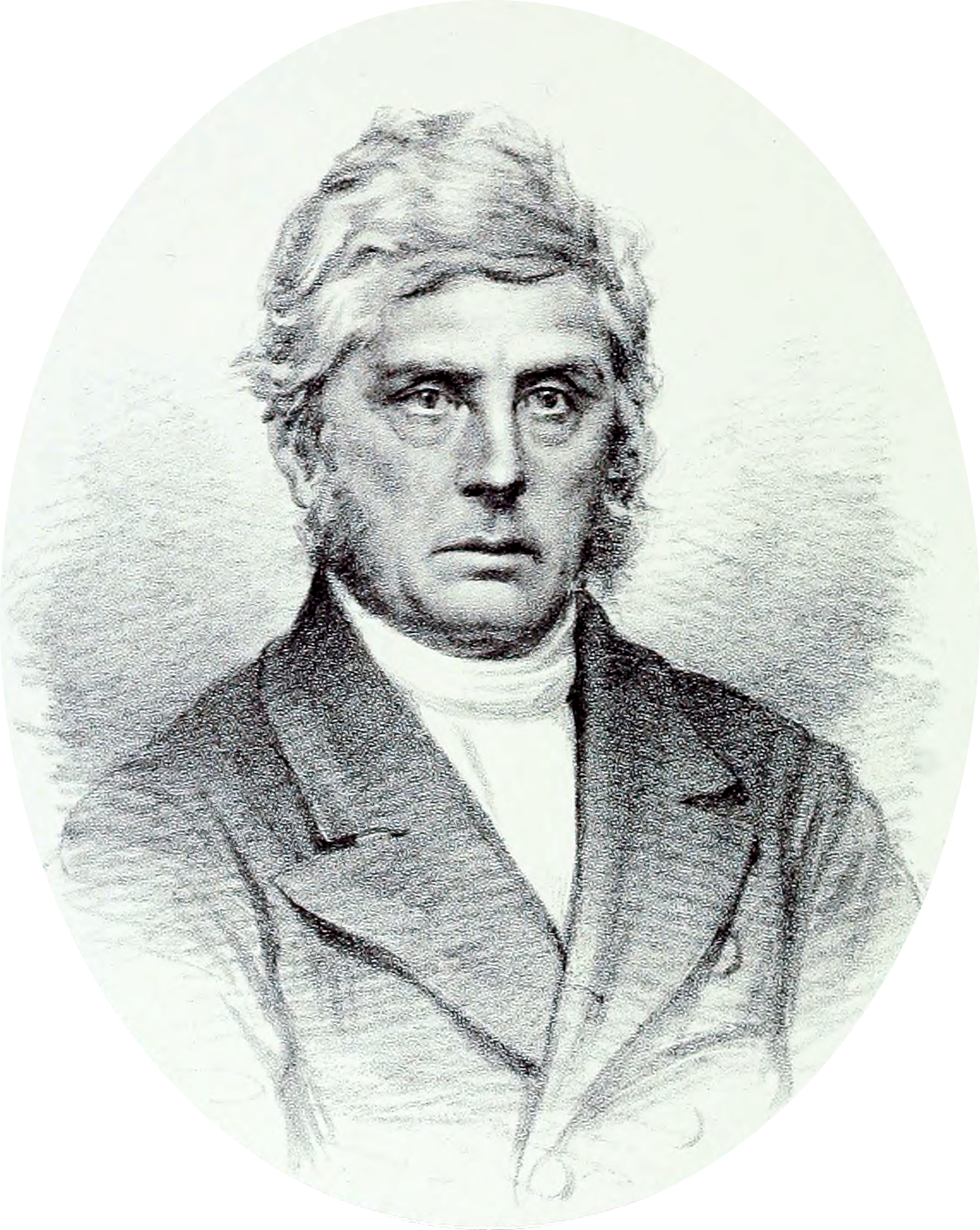
- Adam Cairns from Disruption Worthies
- Church: Church of Scotland; Free Church of Scotland; Presbyterian Church of Victoria

Personal details
- Born: 30 January 1802
- Died: 30 January 1881 (aged 79)

assistant minister of St Cuthbert's Church, Edinburgh
- In office 1825–1827

minister of Manor
- In office 21 August 1828 – 7 April 1833

minister of Dunbog
- In office 7 April 1833 – 1 September 1837

minister of Cupar
- In office 1 September 1837 – 18 May 1843

minister of Free Church, Cupar-Fife
- In office 18 May 1843 – 26 August 1853

minister of Chalmers Church, Melbourne
- In office 1853–1876

Moderator of General Assembly of the Presbyterian Church of Victoria
- In office 1 November 1859 – end

first Principal of the Theological Hall of the Presbyterian Church of Victoria and Professor of Divinity
- In office 1865–1873

Adam Cairns (1802–1881) was a Scottish Presbyterian minister. He served in Scotland and Australia.

In 1837 he became minister of Cupar. During the Disruption schism of 1842, he sided with the Free Church, and was employed in parochial work until 1853, when he accepted a commission from the Colonial Committee of the Free Church to proceed to Melbourne, where he arrived in September of that year. There, amidst the excitement of the gold fever, he laid the foundations of Presbyterianism in Victoria, acting as pastor of the Chalmers Church Congregation till 1865, when, his health failing, he became an emeritus minister, retaining his standing in the Church without pastoral charge. He died on his birthday January 30, 1881.

== Early life and education ==
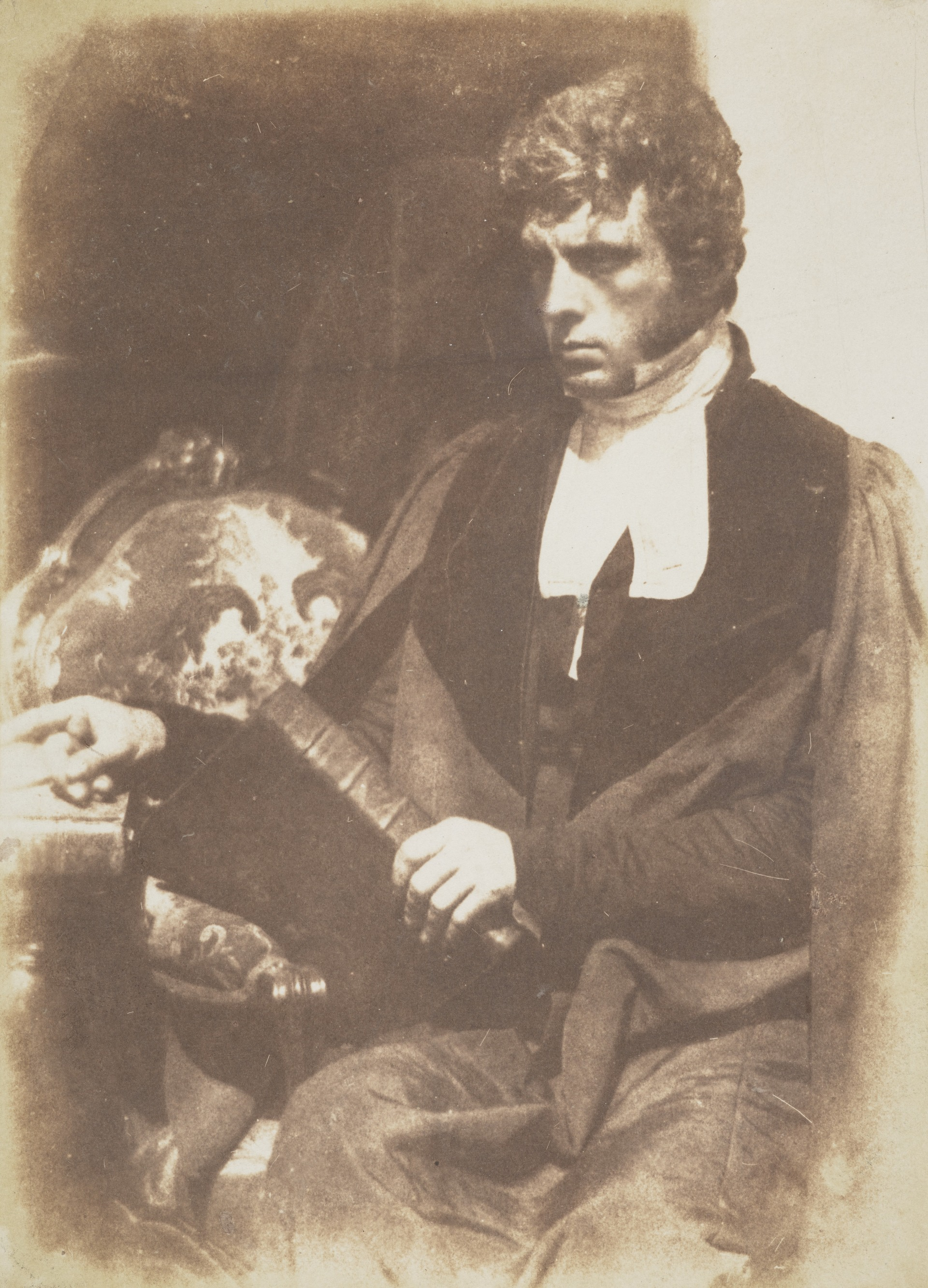
Rev. Cairns from National Gallieries Scotland by Hill & Adamson There is some doubt as to who this photograph depicts. Other images of Adam Cairns can be found on the East Melbourne Historical Society website.

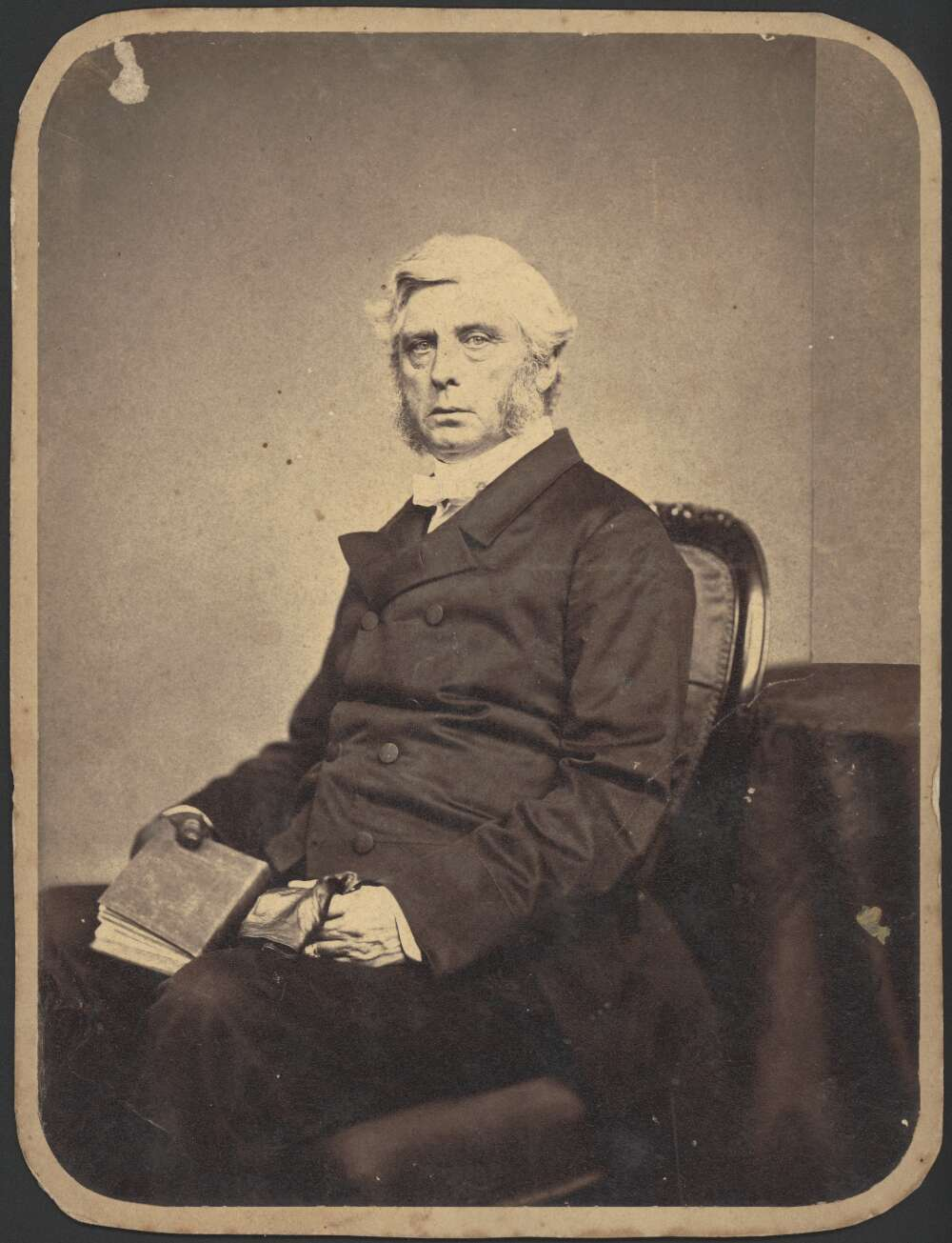
Portrait of Reverend Adam Cairns holding book in Chalmers Church, Melbourne

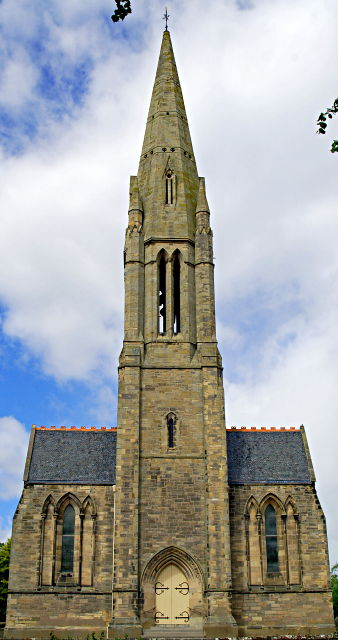
Cupar Free Church

Adam Cairns was born at the manse of Longforgan, on 30 January 1802. Of that parish his father, also called Adam Cairns, was minister for many years. Dr. Cairns’s father appears to have belonged to the parish of Temple. His mother’s father was minister of the parish of Kinnaird, in the Carse of Gowrie. He was descended from a long line of ministers.

Having received the rudimentary part of his education in his native parish, he entered the University of St. Andrews before he was fourteen. He was a hard working student. Of himself he has been heard to say, “I have no great natural ability; and any measure of success to which I have attained has been won through hard labour and close application to present duty.”

He was licensed as a preacher by the Presbytery of Cupar on 5 October 1824. Soon after this, he passed through a severe ordeal, which lasted for several years. His health at this stage suffered greatly, and threatened for a time entirely to give way. Cast on his own resources, he was obliged to support himself by private teaching. In various ways his strength was overtaxed; he was in a state of physical exhaustion, nervous and irritable.

== Early ministry ==
After serving for a time as assistant to Henry Moncreiff, minister of the parish of St. Cuthbert’s, Edinburgh, Cairns was presented to the parish of Manor, in the county of Peebles, where he was ordained on 21 August 1828. The parish is a quiet pastoral valley and for four years and a-half he went in and out among them.

But now his work in this his first charge was drawing to a close. His health was again seriously affected. His old complaint returned upon him. It was brought on, or at all events accelerated, by the illness of a brother, who had returned from America in quest of health. Having come to reside at the manse at Manor, Mr. Cairns was unremitting in his attention to him. The complaint in his brother’s case got worse. He died. The care and anxiety of waiting at that death-bed left serious effects on Cairns’s own health. And just at the time when a change was desirable, he received a presentation to the parish of Dunbog, in the north-west of Fife. Feeling it to be his duty to accept the offer, he was inducted into that charge, on 7 April 1833. Being strictly a rural parish, the work was easy. It gave the opportunity for recruiting his shattered health. It was here, and on 11 February 1834, that Cairns was married to Miss Jessie Ballingall.

After a successful ministry in his second charge of about equal duration with that of his first, Mr. Cairns was translated to Cupar-Fife.

== Ministry in Cupar ==
It was a collegiate charge. He was inducted on 1 September 1837. In the midst of his labour his strength again gave way. For months his life hung quivering in the balance. He was an invalid for years. Again there is another break, and it seemed at the time that his ministry was at end. At the Disruption in 1843 he sided with the Free Church. In November 1847, during the afternoon service, he was struck down in the pulpit. He was carried to the vestry, and there laid down as a dying man. Contrary to expectation, he soon recovered. Having gone to Gibraltar, in the hope that the climate there would renovate his shattered system, and feeling greatly benefited by the change, he hired a hall in the principal street, where he preached morning and evening, the morning attendance being always crowded. The Free Church minister of Cupar was able to contribute, to the current literature of the day. In view of this, and in particular, in recognition of an able and interesting volume produced by him, entitled "The Second Woe", the Senatus of St. Andrews University conferred on him the degree of D.D. on 9 April 1853.

== Move to Australia ==
The gold discovery in Australia was attracting universal interest and migrants were landing daily there in thousands. The Free Church determined to strengthen the hands of the ministers already in Australia, by sending immediately other ten or twelve at least. Ten young men gave their consent to go. They were but newly licensed, and though now to be ordained, they had no experience. It was needful, therefore, to secure along with them one or two ministers of standing and experience. Two such men were Mackintosh Mackay, of Dunoon, and the other the Rev. Dr. Cairns, of Cupar.

Cairns and three other preachers and their families sailed on the Hurricane, leaving Glasgow in May 1853 and arriving in Hobson's Bay on 10 September that year.

The twelve ministers, sailing some together, and others singly, in different vessels, all arrived safely in Australia. The sphere assigned to Dr. Cairns was Melbourne. It was then in a state of strange transition; passing from a small town into the dimensions of a great and populous city. There were two congregations of the Free Church in Melbourne at the time, but only one church, the second congregation worshipping in a rented hall. Cairns at once commenced his labours, preaching in the Temperance Hall in the forenoon, and in Knox’s Church in the evening. A large congregation sprang into existence at once. It was one of the largest in the southern hemisphere. From his first public appearance it was felt by all classes that he was to wield an immense power in the colony. On a valuable piece of ground on the Eastern Hill, granted by the Government, a large wooden erection was hastily run up, which served as a church for two or three years, until a more substantial building was erected. Here Dr. Cairns ministered to a large and attached congregation for more than twenty years. In 1876 he demitted his charge, constrained to do so on account of advancing years and failing strength.

To mark the 50th anniversary of his preaching career, a Cairns scholarship was set up at the Presbyterian University College.

He died at home in Richmond, Melbourne on 30 January 1881.

== Works ==
- Some Objections to Universal Atonement Stated and the Current Objections to a Particular and Efficacious Atonement considered, two discourses (Cupar, 1844)
- On the Origin and Obligation of the Sabbath, being No. 1, Sermons on the Sabbath (Dundee, 1847)
- Account of Dunbog (New Statistical Account, ix.)
- The Second Woe (Edinburgh, 1852)
- Sermon LXIII. (Free Church Pulpit, ii.)

== Family ==
On 11 February 1834 he married Jessie Ballingall (died 26 August 1906). They had six children —

- Margaret, born 26 August 1835
- Elizabeth, born 25 February 1837
- Jessie, born 5 September 1840
- Ebenezer Adam, born 8 January 1843
- Jane Ballingall, born 1847, married Robert Harper
- a daughter who died young

== See also ==
James Forbes
