= Tom Lloyd (bushranger) =

Cousin of Ned Kelly

Tom Lloyd was first cousin to Ned and Dan Kelly, the so-called fifth member of the Kelly Gang.

J.J. Kenneally interviewed him for his 1929 book, The Inner History of the Kelly Gang, the first sympathetic account of the gang and the first to incorporate information from him.
