= Robert Harper (Australian politician) =

Australian politician (1842–1919)

The Honourable Robert Harper
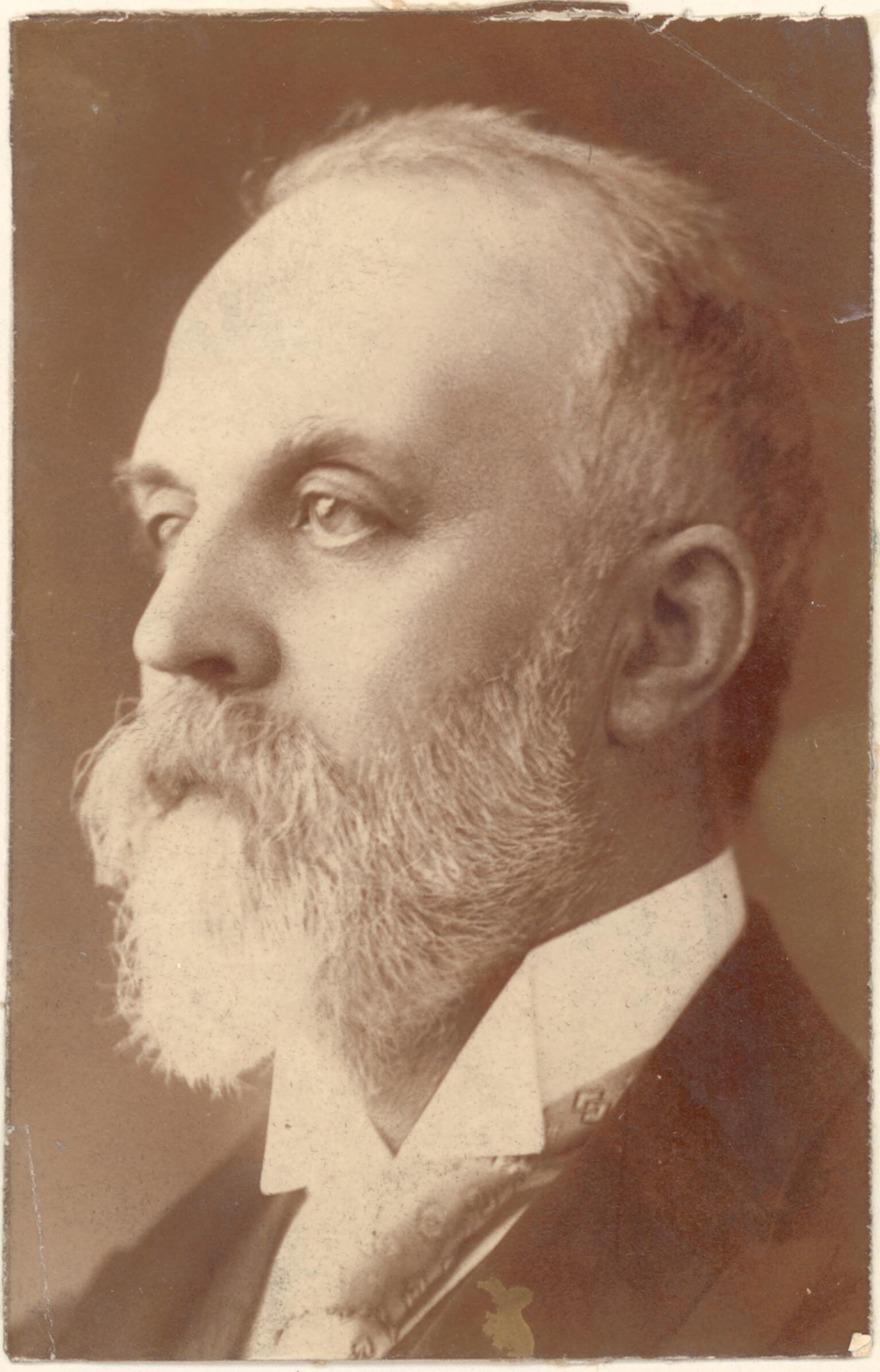

Member of the Australian Parliament for Mernda
- In office 29 March 1901 – 23 April 1913
- Preceded by: New seat
- Succeeded by: Division abolished

Personal details
- Born: 1 February 1842 Glasgow, Scotland
- Died: 9 January 1919 (aged 76) South Yarra, Victoria, Australia
- Party: Protectionist (to 1909); Liberal (from 1909)
- Spouse: Jane Cairns (m. 1868)
- Relations: Andrew Harper (brother); Margaret Harper (niece); Adam Cairns (father-in-law)
- Education: The Glasgow Academy
- Occupation: Businessman

Robert Harper (1 February 1842 – 9 January 1919) was an Australian businessman and politician. He was the founder of Robert Harper and Co., which became one of Melbourne's largest dry goods firms, and served terms in the Parliament of Victoria and as one of the inaugural member of the Australian House of Representatives.

Harper was born in Scotland and arrived in Australia at a young age. In 1865 he went into business as a spice merchant, establishing Robert Harper and Co. which subsequently expanded into milling and manufacturing operations with branches in most Australian colonies and New Zealand. He developed diverse business interests and was a director of various public companies. Harper served several terms in the Victorian Legislative Assembly between 1879 and 1897, although he never held ministerial office. He was elected to the first federal parliament in 1901, holding the Victorian seat of Mernda until his retirement in 1913. He was associated with Alfred Deakin's Liberal Protectionist Party, although he was known as one of its more social conservative members.

== Early life ==
Harper was born on 1 February 1842 in Glasgow, Scotland. He was the son of Elizabeth (née Calderwood) and Robert Harper, his father being a merchant. His younger brother Andrew Harper became a prominent Biblical scholar.

Harper was educated at The Glasgow Academy until the age of thirteen. He and his family emigrated to Australia in August 1856, settling in Melbourne. He subsequently began working for James F. McKenzie and Co., a supplier of coffee, spices and other commodities. He became a partner in the firm in 1863, but left two years later to start his own enterprise.

== Business career ==
In 1865, Harper founded Robert Harper & Co. in Melbourne, "trading in tea, coffee and spices from the East Indies and later in oatmeal and flour". It subsequently took over the factories of the Oriental Rice Mill Company and W. Degrave & Co., allowing it to expand into milling and manufacturing operations.

Harper was joined in the firm by his brothers William and John and by the 1870s it was one of Melbourne's largest merchant firms. The company subsequently established branches in the other Australian colonies and New Zealand, manufacturing "a wide range of food products including breakfast cereals and oatmeal, lentils, deserts, spices and bird seed and stock food". It survived the Australian banking crisis of 1893, unlike many other firms. The company was publicly listed in 1914 and was ultimately acquired by the American multinational Ralston Purina in the 1960s.

Harper developed diverse business interests, with holdings in banking, property, sugar, coal, timber, insurance and the pastoral industry. He was president of the Victorian Chamber of Manufactures from 1877 to 1878, a long-serving director of the Commercial Bank of Australia and the Kauri Timber Company (chairman from 1890 to 1894), and part-owner of the Dhurringile sheep station in Gippsland.

== Colonial politics ==
Harper first stood for parliament at an 1879 by-election for the Victorian Legislative Assembly seat of West Bourke, caused by the death of John Smith. He was narrowly defeated by future prime minister Alfred Deakin, who resigned the seat a month later after a controversy over alleged voting irregularities. Harper defeated Deakin at the second by-election, in August 1879, and was re-elected at the February 1880 general election. However, at the July 1880 election a few months later Deakin regained the seat.

Harper was very active on parliamentary committees but never held ministerial office. His early political causes included opposition to the secularisation of state schools and the proposed opening of the National Gallery of Victoria on Sundays. His entry into active politics had been prompted by what he saw as the radical views of Victorian premier Graham Berry and the events of Black Wednesday in 1878. He voted against Berry's constitutional reform bill in 1879, the defeat of which by a single vote contributed to the downfall of Berry's government.

In June 1882, Harper returned to parliament after winning a by-election for East Bourke. He was defeated at the 1889 general election, but returned at another by-election in August 1891, serving until another defeat at the 1897 general election. He was involved with the formation of the National Association of Victoria, which sought to counter the influence of the newly formed Progressive Political League of Victoria. He was associated with the conservative faction in the Victorian parliament but later split with them over his support for economic protectionism.

== Federal politics ==
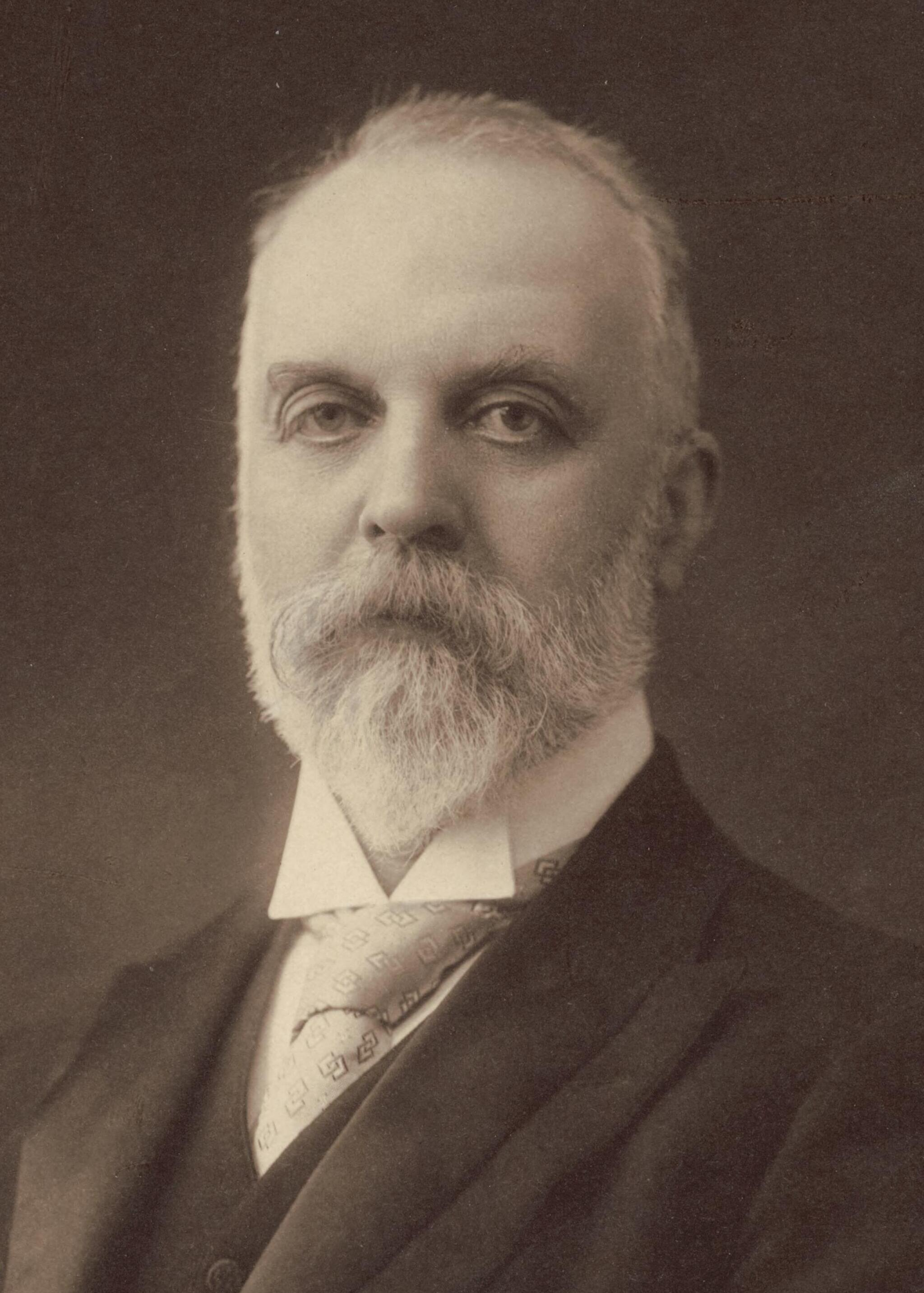
Harper c. 1901

Harper was elected to the House of Representatives at the inaugural federal election in 1901, winning the seat of Mernda. He stood as a Liberal Protectionist aligned with Deakin, albeit as one of the more conservative members of the party. Harper was re-elected at the 1903, 1906 and 1910 elections, retiring prior to the 1913 election upon the abolition of his seat in a redistribution. He had joined the new Liberal Party upon its creation in 1909 as a fusion of the Protectionists and the former Free Trade Party.

=== Legal dispute ===
In 1908, Harper was sued for slander and libel by James Ronald, his former parliamentary colleague and fellow Presbyterian, with Ronald seeking damages of £3,000 (equivalent to $480,000 in 2022). Harper had informed a committee of the Presbyterian Church of Victoria that Ronald was an unsuitable candidate for the ministry, on the grounds that he had told "improper stories". The case turned into a legal saga, with another Presbyterian clergyman being imprisoned for contempt of court and members of parliament being called to give evidence. The jury in the original Supreme Court of Victoria case accepted Harper's defence of truth. However, the presiding judge refused to award costs to Harper. Ronald subsequently appealed to the full bench of the Supreme Court and then to the High Court of Australia, with both appeals rejected.

After his defeat in court, Ronald alleged that several of Harper's witnesses had perjured themselves or unduly influenced other witnesses. In November 1909, William Harrison, a witness against Ronald, was convicted of perjury over his testimony and imprisoned for three months. The following year, Patrick Hill was convicted of perjury and subornation of perjury. The Victorian government then charged Harper and several others with conspiring to defeat the ends of justice. Harper was found not guilty at the resulting trial, with the presiding judge directing the jury to acquit him and laying the responsibility for the tainted evidence with Hill.

In 1913, Ronald launched a renewed suit against Harper, seeking damages of £10,000 (equivalent to $1,370,000 in 2022) and to overturn the previous verdicts on the grounds of proven perjury. Both the Supreme Court and High Court refused to accept his case, finding that the outcome of the previous libel suit would have been the same even if the tainted evidence was excluded.

== Personal life ==
In 1868, Harper married Jane Ballingall Cairns, the daughter of Presbyterian minister Adam Cairns. She became "a prominent Melbourne philanthropist", holding offices in several charities. The couple had seven children together, two of whom predeceased him.

Harper helped establish the Presbyterian Church in Toorak and was a church elder. He was involved in the church's schism in the early 1880s which saw liberal preacher Charles Strong resign from the church and establish a breakaway Australian Church.

In about 1915, Harper purchased Airlie, a mansion in South Yarra. He died at his home on 9 January 1919, aged 76. His estate was valued for probate at £175,239 (equivalent to $15,600,000 in 2022).

== See also ==
- Robert Harper Building

Parliament of Australia
Division created	Member for Mernda; 1901–1913	Division abolished
