= F. C. Appleton =

Australian actor and university lecturer

Frederick Charles Appleton (1835 – 14 February 1914) was an Australian actor, noted as a Shakespearean character actor, a "painstaking studious aspirant for histrionic honours", praised for his "considerable ability and tact". In 1883 he earned an academic degree and became a university lecturer, an unusual conjugation of careers, shared with H. B. Irving.

== History ==
Appleton, the elder son of Charles Appleton and Mary Jones Appleton (died 10 January 1889) of Goldings Hill House, Loughton, Essex, England, was born in 1835 on board a ship bound for London from Melbourne, then part of the Colony of New South Wales. Arthur William Appleton was a brother. They were settled in rural Essex until, around 1853, his father again left for Melbourne, chasing the economic boom that followed the discovery of gold. He established Pawson, Appleton and Co., with a store in Bourke Street, west as a branch of J. F. Pawson and Co., of St Paul's Churchyard, London. His family remained in London during this period, giving young Appleton the opportunity to follow his interest in theatre, seeing all the shows and taking elocution and acting lessons from William Hoskins. Then the time came to leave for what was by then the Colony of Victoria, following Hoskins' advice, he packed a great chest with costumes suitable for a variety of Shakespearean roles, including a Prince Hamlet outfit exactly like that made for Wybert Rousby.

On arrival in Melbourne, Appleton was installed by his father in the Bourke Street warehouse, but showed neither the aptitude for, nor interest in, business and soon decamped for the goldfields of Sandhurst (present-day Bendigo).

Charles Appleton's ambitions came to nothing, and he was found insolvent in 1858. He had cleared his debts a year later, and no further record has been found.

There he joined a theatre company managed by George Fawcett Rowe and one Ramsay, and won for himself the part of Lord Lovell in Philip Massinger's A New Way to Pay Old Debts. He is reported as next joining the Hoskins/Holt company, but corroborative evidence is hard to find. In 1861 he joined Fred Younge's company at the Theatre Royal, which toured Geelong, Ballarat and Bendigo the following year. In 1862 he was with Barry Sullivan's company, playing Charles d'Arville in F. C. Burnand and Montagu Williams's Henri Desart, or, The Isle of St Tropez.

In 1863–1864 he was with the Dillon - Kean company in Sydney, at the Prince of Wales and the Royal Victoria. He appeared in Hazlewood's adaptation of Lady Audley's Secret, played Cassio in Othello, Barnard Reynolds in Miriam's Crime by H. T. Craven, Sefarino Del'Aguila in Rigoletto (based on Le roi s'amuse by Victor Hugo), Horatio in Hamlet, starring Dillon as the Prince; Taylor's The Contested Election as the opposition attorney; Claude Melnotte in Bulwer's Richelieu; the Earl of Richmond in Richard III; Icilius in Knowles's Virginius; Edgar in King Lear; the Prince de Gonsagues in John Brougham's The Duke's Motto, an adaptation by J. H. McCarthy of Paul Feval's French original.

In 1866 he played in J. B. Buckstone's Leap Year, H. T. Craven's Milky White and Tom Taylor's Up in the Hills.

In 1867 he was with James Robertson Anderson playing Edmund in King Lear at the Haymarket, to the displeasure of one critic, who thought him better suited to Horatio, in a generally miscast production which had the burly Anderson as the feeble king. He played Gaston Rieux in Camille, based on Hugo's La Dame aux Camélias, with Robert Heir as Armand Duval and his wife in the title role. In 1868 he played Captain Hawtree in T. W. Robertson's Caste, and leading parts in Augustin Daly's Under the Gaslight, H. J. Byron's comedy £100,000 and Douglas Jerrold's burlesque Black Eyed Susan. He toured India with G. B. W. Lewis 1868–1870, and on his return played a middle-aged Romeo to Mrs Bandmann's Juliet. for Harwood, Stewart, Hennings and Coppin at the Theatre Royal, Melbourne. He had a long association with that company, playing Matthew Leigh in Lester Wallack's Rosedale; Pygmalion in W. S. Gilbert's Pygmalion and Galatea; Robert Redburn in H. J. Byron's The Lancashire Lass; Cassio in Othello; though comic parts such as Malvolio (Twelfth Night) were outside his comfort zone. Harwood and Stewart left in December 1876 and management of the Royal became Coppin, Hennings and Greville.

In 1880 he played an awkward and unenthusiastic Romeo to Louise Pomeroy's Juliet, but was appreciated in the historic productions of Cymbeline and A Winter's Tale. in which Pomeroy played both Hermione and Perdita.

During this time he had been studying at the University of Melbourne. He was conferred with the BA on 15 April 1882. hence his characterization in the popular press as "Actor and Scholar".

In 1882 the American comedians Joseph B. Polk and his wife Julia A. Polk were brought to Australia by Eduardo Majeroni to present Theo H. Sayre's The Strategist (Note: A playbill held by the Chicago Public Library refers to the version played by Clinton Hall as The Strategists but all references in Australia are singular. Dr Sayre, a New York pharmacist, also wrote A Lively Girl and Mixed Pickles, all now forgotten.) at the Princess Theatre, Melbourne and Appleton was recruited into his troupe. Sam'l of Posen followed, then The American, both written by George H. Jessop. He supported W. E. Sheridan during the first half of the American tragedian's first Australian tour (1882–1883). He played Sir Francis Levison in East Lynne, The Friar in Casimir Delavigne's Louis XI, Edmund in King Lear, Allworth to his Sir Giles Overreach in A New Way to Pay Old Debts, also in a rare revival of The Willow Copse. He also played Horatio when Sheridan's wife, Miss Pomeroy, was cast as Prince Hamlet. In 1883 he supported W. J. Holloway in that actor-manager's country tour, followed by the premiere of George Darrell's The Sunny South at the Melbourne Opera House.

From 1885 to 1889 he toured with the MacMahon and Leitch company, along with Grattan Riggs.

In 1886 his Wilfred Denver in The Silver King and Harold Armytage in Lights o' London were praised, as was his little daughter Ethel, who appeared in both melodramas for MacMahon and Leitch.

In the late 1880s he toured as "F. C. Appleton, B.A.", giving recitations from Shakespeare, Sheridan, Dickens and Banjo Patterson, and in 1890s gave private tutorials in elocution at his residence, 308 Cardigan street, Carlton.

He was with Alfred Dampier's company in New South Wales 1897–1898 and 1900–1901 playing Cassio to Fairclough's Othello at the Theatre Royal and the Earl of Leicester to Madame Janauschek's Mary Stuart in Schiller's drama.

In 1895 he was "leading man" to Mrs G. B. W. Lewis's company, touring Jane Shore by Wills, author of Eugene Aram.

He had a long engagement with Harwood, Stewart, Hennings and Coppin at the Theatre Royal, Melbourne. Critics observed that he never had a leading role (though he was Australia's first Pygmalion in Gilbert's Pygmalion and Galatea) he made every part he undertook, from farce to Shakespeare, a winner.

In later years he founded Loughton College, 156 Nicholson Street, Fitzroy, and served as Principal, teaching English and Arithmetic. He died at his residence in Fitzroy, in his eightieth year.

== Some notable roles ==
- Duke Manfredi in The Fool's Revenge
- Richard Stockton in The Irish Detective
- The Evil Spirit in Katherine Alice Russell's play The Phantom Ship

Unlike several contemporaries he never formed his own company so never used his "Hamlet" costume in that part. He did however get to play one Shakespearean title role: swapping his part, "Iago", with Charles Dillon's "Othello".

== Other interests ==
Appleton enjoyed painting and sketching, and some of his watercolors were exceptionally fine.

Appleton was a prominent member of the Australasian Dramatic and Musical Association

== Last days ==
He died at his home at 310 Fitzroy-street, Fitzroy, and his remains were buried at the Melbourne General Cemetery.

== Family ==
Charles Appleton and Mary Jones Appleton (died 10 January 1889) of Goldings Hill House, Loughton, Essex, England

- Frederick Charles Appleton (1835 – 14 February 1914) married Jenny Bryce (died 14 October 1927) in Hobart some time around 1860. She originally trained for opera but made her name in burlesque, and made a specialty of Irish roles; she was "a charming soubrette and clever dancer". When Maggie Moore made her first appearance in Melbourne, a leading critic said she danced "almost as well as Mrs Appleton". Home at 308 Cardigan Street, Carlton. They had two sons and five daughters:

- William Frederick Appleton ( – 17 September 1920), accountant, married May Sands, eldest daughter of Stephen and Agnes Sands on 5 July 1905, lived Wild Street, North Preston; children Madge, Wilfred, Dorothy.
- Maud Mary Appleton (1867 – 6 October 1948) was an actress, appeared in The Kelly Gang as Mrs Kelly. She married Robert Ethelbert Inman;(c. 1863 – 26 September 1940) their daughter Adeline Ethelbert Inman, aka Adele Inman (1895 – 16 July 1981) was an actress, played Kate Kelly in The Kelly Gang.
- George Appleton ( – ) barely mentioned except in lists of Appleton children.
- Edith Appleton ( – ) actress, known for repertory theatre, last notice in 1935.
- Ethel Jennie Appleton ( – 1 March 1934) was an actress with the Charles Holloway company. She wrote the play The Rest Cure. In December 1883 Edith and Ethel Appleton made their professional theatre debuts in Augustus Glover's The Wanderer at the Bijou Theatre, Melbourne for Eduardo Majeroni. They had "trouser parts" (the Prince of Wales and the Duke of York) in W. G. Wills' Jane Shore in August 1884 and the Australian premiere of Hoodman Blind at the Theatre Royal for Williamson, Garner & Musgrove in 1886.

Ethel played many other parts: Emmeline in The Old Corporal for the Majeronis; and Cissy Denver in The Silver King and the waif Tim in Lights o' London in 1886. She had a long and successful stage career, then took private students.
Ethel Appleton married banker Ernest Frank Reid (c. 1869 – 1 November 1919) on 14 November 1906. They had two children:
- Alan Reid (May 1913 – )
- Noel Mary Appleton Reid (12 December 1908 – 7 May 1952), a musician with puppet theatre run by aunts Mabel and Irene. She died as result of an accident.

- Mabel Appleton ( – ) created "Golden Age puppet theatre" with sister Irene
- Irene Appleton ( – ) was active in amateur theatre. She was member of a quartet that played Katharine S. Prichard's The Great Man in 1923. She wrote the short plays The Burglar and The Betrothal. Mabel and Irene lived in Gordon Street, Toorak, Victoria.
They had a home at 310 Fitzroy Street, Fitzroy, Victoria
which daughter was born 5 December 1881? at 5 Earnbank Terrace, Cardigan Street, Carlton, Victoria.

- George A. Appleton ( – 24 July 1868), was a fine painter, having studied at the Royal Academy, London. He worked for the Adelaide Photographic Company as a specialist photo-tinter in oils from 1865 to 1866, and won several prizes for his oil paintings at a Society of Arts Exhibition in 1865. He was later associated with A. C. Habbe, painting transparencies to celebrate the Sydney visit of the Duke of Edinburgh in January 1868. He was one of a team of artists, under Edgar Ray, who produced a great diorama Christmas in Old England exhibited in Melbourne in 1863. Others were M. N. Chevalier, Nicholas Chevalier, E. J. Greig (first cartoonist for Sydney Punch, drowned 1864), John Hennings, J. Willis, and Mouritz Freyberger. He died in a London train from self-inflicted gunshot wound.
- Arthur William Appleton married Sarah Ann (c. 1854 – 5 July 1950), lived McGregor Street, East Malvern, (same street as the Reid-Appleton family). A son, Harold Appleton, married to Ethel Appleton, died in Perth on 3 July 1936.
