= How M'Dougal Topped the Score =

Poem by Australian writer Thos. E. Spencer

"How M'Dougal Topped The Score"
- by Thos. E. Spencer
- Written: 1898
- First published in: The Bulletin
- Country: Australia
- Language: English

Full text
- How M'Dougal Topped the Score at Wikisource

"How M'Dougal Topped The Score" (1898) is a poem by Australian poet Thos. E. Spencer.

The poem was originally published in The Bulletin on 12 March 1898, and subsequently reprinted in the author's major collection of poetry, How M'Dougal Topped The Score and Other Verses and Sketches (1906), as well as other poetry anthologies.

== Synopsis ==
The poem tells the story of an historic cricket match between the small towns of Piper's Flat and Molongo. Piper's Flat is challenged by Molongo to a single-innings cricket match, with the loser to pay for a slap-up lunch at McGinnis's pub. However, on the day, Piper's Flat can only field 10 players, so they reluctantly recruit McDougall, the old Scotsman from Cooper's Creek to make up the numbers. He and his dog Pincher contrive to score the required runs for victory, after Piper's Flat were in a perilous position.

== Critical reception ==
The Oxford Companion to Australian Literature states: "Spencer's poem celebrates the bushman's talents for devising ingenious but essentially harmless methods of besting a rival; it takes its place alongside A. B. Paterson's accounts of the stratagems of drovers to outwit squatters and of racehorse owners and jockeys to outwit bookmakers."

== Publication history ==
After the poem's initial publication in The Bulletin it was reprinted as follows:

- The Bulletin Reciter: A Collection of Verses for Recitation from the Bulletin 1880-1901 edited by A. G. Stephens (1901)
- How M'Dougal Topped The Score and Other Verses and Sketches (1906)
- Favourite Australian Poems edited by Ian Mudie, Rigby, 1963
- From the Ballads to Brennan edited by T. Inglis Moore, Angus & Robertson, 1964
- Complete Book of Australian Folk Lore edited by Bill Scott (1976)
- The Bulletin 29 January 1980
- The Penguin Book of Humorous Verse edited by Bill Scott (1984)
- The Illustrated Treasury of Australian Verse edited by Beatrice Davis (1984)
- My Country : Australian Poetry and Short Stories, Two Hundred Years edited by Leonie Kramer (1985)
- The Bulletin 24–31 December 1985
- Old Ballads from the Bush edited by Bill Scott (1987)
- The Bushwackers Australian Song Book edited by Jan Wositzky and Dobe Newton (1988)
- A Collection of Australian Bush Verse Peter Antill-Rose, 1989
- A Return to Poetry 2000 edited by Michael Duffy (2000)
- 100 Australian Poems You Need to Know edited by Jamie Grant (2008)
- 60 Classic Australian Poems for Children edited by Chris Cheng (2009)
- Australian Poetry Since 1788 edited by Geoffrey Lehmann and Robert Gray (2011)
- The Best Australian Yarns : And Other True Stories edited by Jim Haynes (2013)

== Film adaptation ==
The poem was adapted for the screen in 1924 written and directed by V. Upton Brown and starring Leslie Gordon, Ida Gresham and Dorothy May.

== See also ==
- 1898 in Australian literature
- 1898 in poetry

== Notes ==
- Minor title variations appear in some texts. Variations in spelling of "M'Dougal" in title are as follows: M'Dougall, McDougall, McDougal.
