= The Bulletin Reciter: A Collection of Verses for Recitation from the Bulletin 1880–1901 =

Australian poetry collection by The Bulletin magazine

The Bulletin Reciter : A Collection of Verses for Recitation 1880–1901
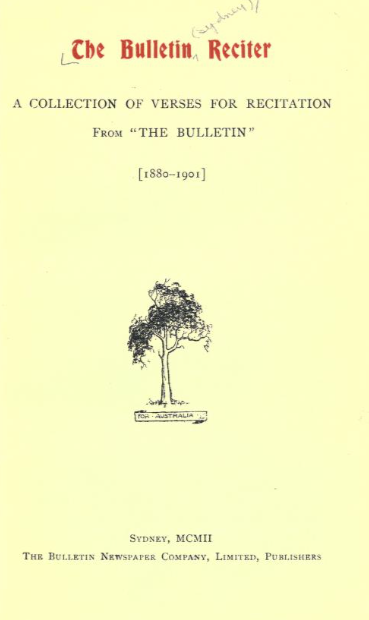
- Title page for The Bulletin Reciter : A Collection of Verses for Recitation 1880–1901 (1901)
- Editor: Alfred George Stephens
- Language: English
- Publisher: The Bulletin
- Publication date: 1901
- Publication place: Australia
- Media type: Print (Hardback)
- Pages: 234
- Followed by: The Bulletin Story Book : A Selection of Stories and Literary Sketches from the Bulletin 1880–1901

The Bulletin Reciter : A Collection of Verses for Recitation 1880–1901 (1901) is an anthology of poems by Australian poets originally published in The Bulletin. It was published in hardback by The Bulletin in 1901, and was followed the same year by a similar collection of stories and literary sketches from the magazine.

The anthology includes 50 poems by various authors.

== Contents ==
- "The Billiard Markers Yarn", Edmund Fisher
- "Spell Oh!", W. E. Carew
- "Off the Grass", Will H. Ogilvie
- "The Brumby's Death", Ethel Mills
- "That Day at Boiling Downs", Jack Mathieu
- "The Bellbird Rung Her Home", Randolph Bedford
- "Out Back", P. P. Quinn
- "After the Floods", Dora Wilcox
- "A Stranger at the U", J. Crawford
- "Sinking", Bendee
- "The Whirligig of Time", T. H. Ord
- "Sold Up", Nil
- "A Legend of the Dargo", W. Long
- "In the Face of the Dead", Ethel Castilla
- "The Man with Rubber Pedals", Montague Grover
- "In the Dead Letter Office", R. Stewart
- "How M'Dougal Topped the Score", Thos. E. Spencer
- "Marian's Child", John Shaw Neilson
- "The Man Who Told You So", Styx
- "A Sea Tragedy", F. Rollitt
- "The Silence of Mullock Creek", Edward Dyson
- "When Mother Calls to Dinner", Uloola
- "M'Ginty's Happy Thought", Edward James Dempsey
- "A Song of Gold", Dora Wilcox
- "The Woman of the Future", P. Luftig
- "Stokin'", Quilp N'
- "Where Are My Dollars Gone?", P. Luftig
- "Wattle Flat", Cecil Poole
- "Wing Fat", Alone
- "The Woman Speaks", Ambrose Pratt
- "consolation:l", L. R. Macleod
- "At the Diggings Store", R. A. F.
- "Bucked off Its Brand", R. A. F.
- "The Price of a Kiss", Elise Espinasse
- "Mick Dooley's Pants", George Essex Evans
- "The Ballad of Stuttering Jim (Illustrating the Survival of the Fittest)", Samuel Cliall White
- "Life's Paradoxes", P. Luftig
- "When Dacey Rode the Mule", A. B. Paterson
- "The How-We-Beat-the-Favourite Affliction", N. M. O'Donnell
- "Gig Fours", Montague Grover
- "Don't Let the Moth Get In", T. A. Wilson
- "The Winner of the Squatters' Cup", Frank Bellman
- "The Three Roads", Victor J. Daley
- "Christmas Belle", John Carew
- "The Confidential Jockey", Francis Kenna
- "How We Won the Ribbon", Will H. Ogilvie
- "A Twisted Idyl", Frank Morton
- "The Tugs of Simpsonville", W. T. Goodge
- "The Sick Cabrider", Edmund Fisher
- "The Honeymoon Train", Alfred George Stephens

== Critical reception ==
A reviewer in The Arena (Melbourne) noted, of the original publication, that: "People who buy reciters are usually humorless persons who do so with the object of inflicting elocutionary punishment on their fellow creatures, and for this purpose the 'Bulletin Reciter' is as good or as bad as any other. It was not put forward either as Australian verse or Australian humour."

On its republication in 1933 a reviewer in the Wellington Times was rather more generous in their praise: "this effort seeks, in the same direction as other endeavours handled by it, to further the knowledge of Australian life and to foster the love of it as depicted by those whose endeavours have run to literary delving...The Reciter is not only interesting reading, but an interesting record, charting the milestones along the progressive and advancing road of Australian literary endeavour."

== Publication history ==
After the original publication by The Bulletin in 1901, the anthology was reprinted in 1933 by the NSW Bookstall Company as part of their Bookstall series.

== See also ==
- 1901 in poetry
- 1901 in Australian literature
