= List of University Football Club coaches =

The following is a list of coaches to have coached the University Football Club, an Australian rules football club who played in the VFL (1908–14).

No.	Coach	P	W	L	D	W%	Years
1	Gerald Brosnan	72	12	60	0	16.67	1910–12; 1914
2	Victor Upton-Brown	18	0	18	0	0.00	1913

Key:

P = Played
W = Won
L = Lost
D = Drew
W% = Win percentage
