= Woman Magazine =

Woman Magazine may refer to:

- Woman (Australian magazine), published from 1934 to 1954
- Woman (UK magazine), published beginning 1937

== See also ==
- List of women's magazines
