= Theatre of Jersey =

Theatre on the Channel Island of Jersey

The history of theatrical performances in Jersey can be traced back to the 18th century. The Opera House, opened by Lillie Langtry in 1900, and the Jersey Arts Centre are the main performance spaces, although performances also take place in parish halls and other venues.

== History ==
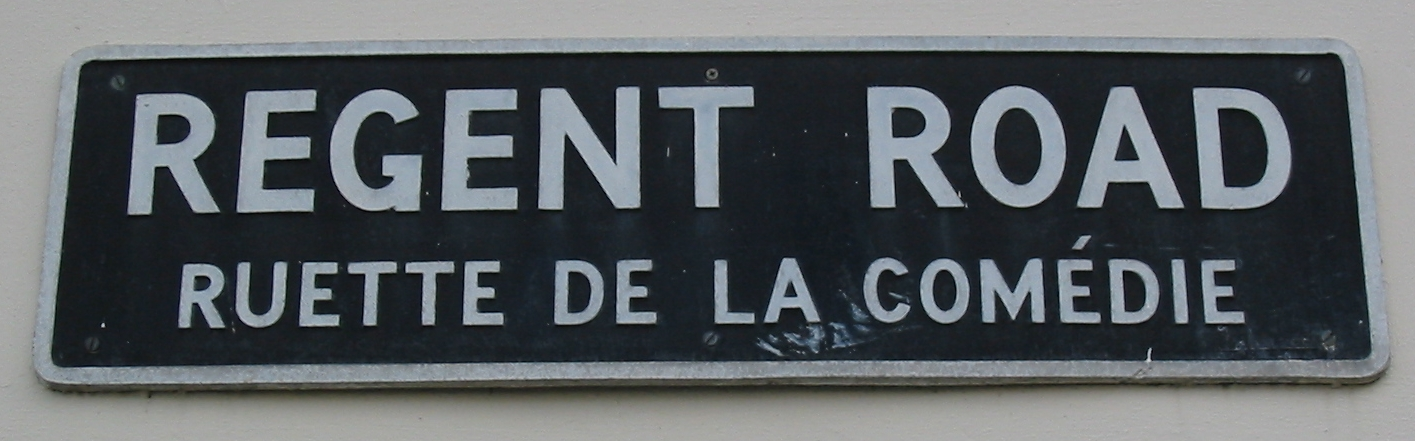
La Ruette de la Comédie in Saint Helier recalls the location of Jersey's first dedicated theatre building

On 14 November 1778 the States of Jersey adopted an Act forbidding the staging of stage plays or farces without the prior permission of the Bailiff and Royal Court. This legislation remains the basis of the current licensing of public entertainment in Jersey: public entertainment, including stage works, is licensed by the Bailiff (advised by the Bailiff's Panel for the Control of Public Entertainment).

The fact that the States deemed it necessary to pass such an Act suggests that theatrical performances were at that time frequent enough and of sufficient concern to the authorities to require the setting up of a regulatory system. However, there is little direct evidence of which plays were being performed as there were at that time no established theatre and no newspapers.

During the 16th and 17th centuries as drama developed in France and England, culture in Jersey was controlled by a strict Calvinist régime, and even the imposition of Anglicanism after 1660 did not alter the basic attitudes to entertainment in Jersey. Sitting between the cultural poles of France and England, Jersey was further isolated by the language situation. Visiting theatre troupes from England would not have been understood by the Jèrriais speaking population, and French troupes were deterred by the frequent states of war or suspicion that existed between France and England during this period.

The language question continued to impede the development of theatre even once theatres had become established, as commented upon by Henry David Inglis in 1834.

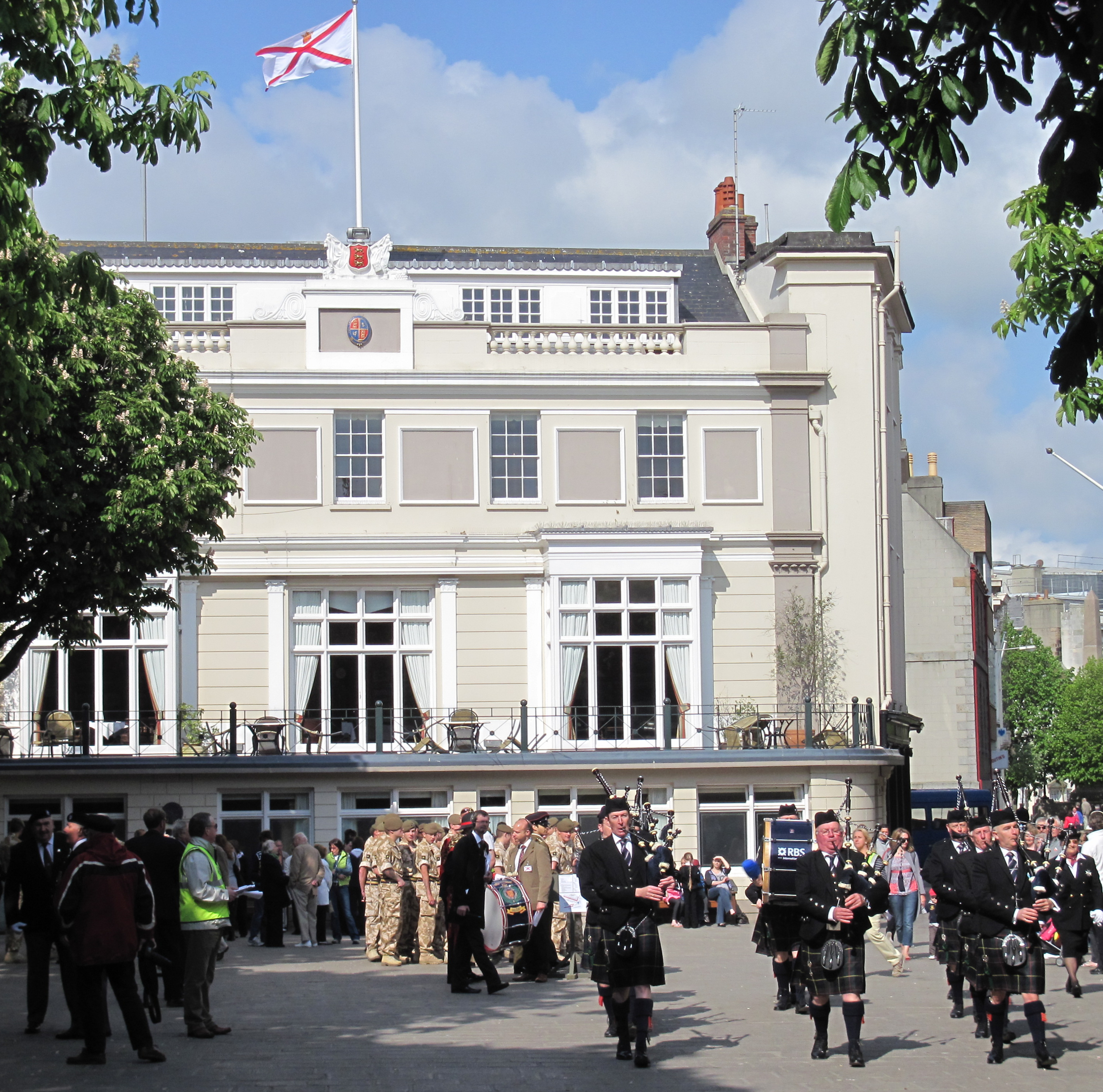
The Long Room (as remodelled) on the first floor above the corn market (now the registry office) survives as a clubroom.

The first location known to have been used as a theatre in Jersey is the Long Room above the Corn Market in the Royal Square, Saint Helier. This was described as "La salle de la comédie" in La Gazette de l'Île de Jersey of 23 March 1788. This assembly room had been used for public presentations before, including meetings addressed to crowds of between 500 and 600 people by John Wesley on 28 and 29 August 1787.

Before 1788 it appears that acting was an amateur pastime, and that the States were concerned that young men were spending too much time in idle distractions. The first specific record of a particular troupe of actors is of an amateur club of 12 gentleman in 1786 proposing to present a season of plays by famous playwrights. The first record of a professional theatre company in Jersey is the visit of a French troupe under a man named Desroches which performed in Jersey between March and May 1788 – the last visit by a French theatrical company until after the end of the Napoleonic Wars. Desroches' company performed L'Amant bourru (by Monvel) and Le Médecin malgré lui (by Molière) in one programme on 25 March 1788 – the first plays known by name to have been performed in Jersey.

English theatre companies visited in the summers of 1792 and 1793. The first English-language play known to have been performed in Jersey was The West Indian by Richard Cumberland on 5 May 1792, followed, amongst others, by The School for Scandal by Richard Brinsley Sheridan on 12 May 1792 and Douglas by John Home on 26 May 1792. The first plays recorded by name to have been performed by amateurs were Alzire and Mérope by Voltaire, in French, in 1795 and 1796.

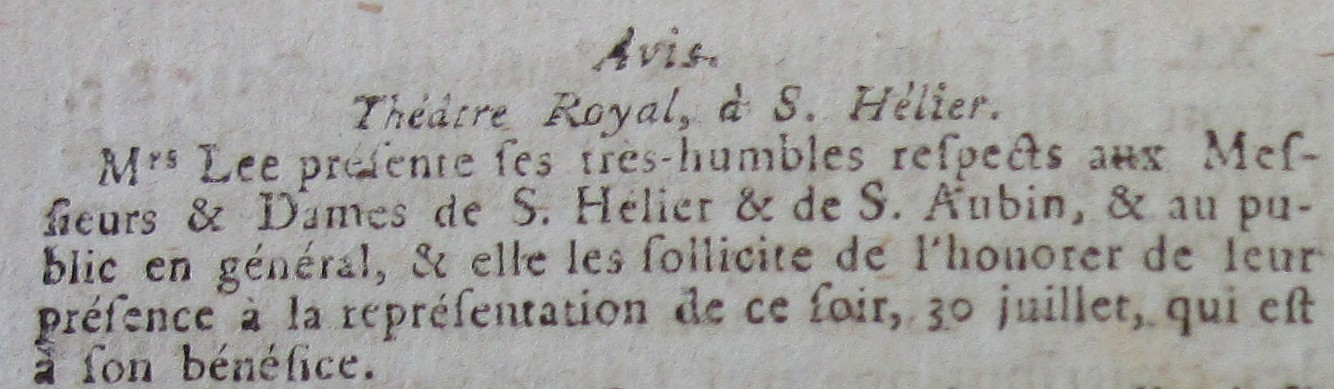
30 July 1796: Mrs Lee advertises a performance of the (unidentified) Théâtre Royal, Saint Helier

Between 1792 and 1796 there were plays advertised as being performed at the "Théâtre Royal". It is not known whether this refers to the Long Room, but the description of a gallery suggests that this might be a different building unless the Long Room had been altered during this period. Plays were also performed in the 1790s outside Saint Helier. The annual midsummer fair in Saint John attracted huge crowds and the English companies of Fisher and Henry Lee are known to have performed in tents there in 1793 and 1795. The Saint John's fair and its entertainments became such an annoyance to the authorities that it was suppressed by Act of the States in 1797.

The first identifiable dedicated theatre space in Jersey was opened in 1802 (not counting the unidentified "Théâtre Royal" which appears not to refer to the same building) by James Shatford, proprietor of the Salisbury theatre, to house his visiting English company. It consisted of a converted barn in what now bears the English name of Regent Road and the French name of Ruette de la Comédie in Saint Helier. The French name preserves the memory of the existence of this theatre. Few records survive to give an idea of the layout or appearance of this theatre which was named "The Theatre Royal", but it was described in 1809 as being "neat and sufficiently extensive". Shatford's company were not in permanent residence; in their absence performances were staged by officers of the British regiments garrisoned in Jersey, under the title of "Garrison Theatricals". These performances were open to the public, and raised money for the relief of poor British prisoners of war in France during the Napoleonic Wars. Once the wars were over, the theatre was used intermittently by both English and French visiting troupes but with little financial success. This theatre was superseded in 1828; the fabric survived until demolition in 1947.

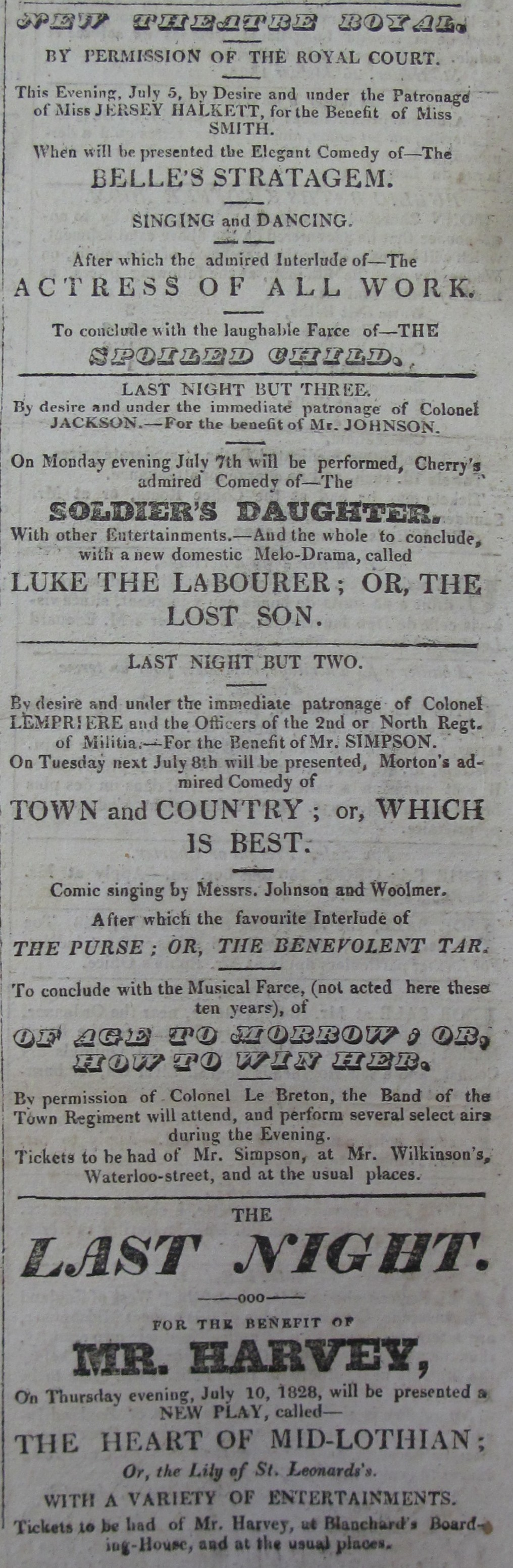
Advertisement for the programme at the Theatre Royal, Jersey: 5 July 1828. Included in the bill: The Belle's Stratagem

On 5 May 1828 a new theatre was opened in Royal Crescent, Saint Helier. This theatre was also named the "Theatre Royal" and was Jersey's first purpose-built theatre. The opening production was A New Way to Pay Old Debts. A backdrop painted to depict a panoramic view of the entrance of Saint Helier Harbour and the whole of St Aubin's Bay from the viewpoint of Fort Regent was particularly admired on opening night. In 1834 the newspaper Le Constitutionnel stated that the owners of the theatre had never broken even. Also in 1834 Henry D. Inglis described the situation as follows:

"There is a theatre indeed; and there are winter assemblies: but the latter are few in number; and not particularly attractive; and as for the former, there is so little encouragement given to the drama in Jersey, that the company is most commonly indifferent. The native inhabitants do not sufficiently understand the English language, to relish English drama; and the residents are not rich enough to afford of themselves, sufficient encouragement to the theatre. It must also be admitted, that naval and military men, are not those amongst whom a taste for the drama is most likely to be found. Companies of French actors, however, are tolerably well supported by the native inhabitants."

The Theatre Royal in Royal Crescent burnt down on 31 July 1863. It took two years for a new theatre to be built: Henry Cornwall opened the Royal Amphitheatre in Gloucester Street on 17 April 1865. This theatre was sold to Wybert Rousby in 1869, and became known as the Theatre Royal, and later as the Theatre Royal and Opera House. In April 1891 Lillie Langtry made her first appearance in a Jersey theatre at the Theatre Royal. Fire broke out in the night of 29 March 1899, destroying the building. A new theatre on the ruins of the Theatre Royal and Opera House. The Opera House was opened by Lillie Langtry on 9 July 1900, who performed in the first play produced in the new premises, The Degenerates. A fire on 12 May 1921 partly destroyed the building, requiring reconstruction. The Opera House, which had been showing films in alternation with live entertainment, became a dedicated cinema in 1931, leaving Springfield Hall as the main venue for theatrical entertainment.

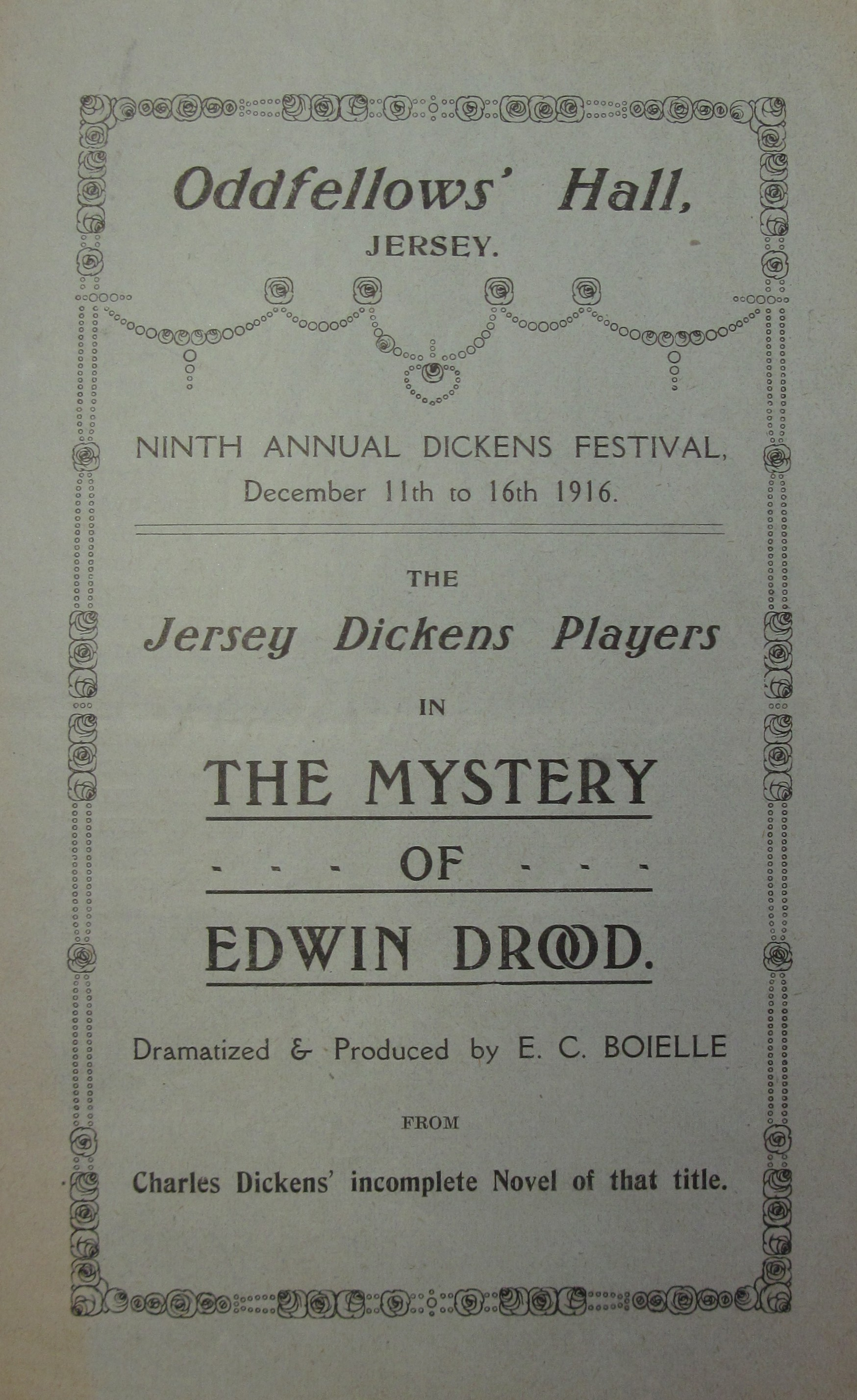
The Mystery of Edwin Drood presented by the Jersey Dickens Players, 1916

Edward Clarence "Teddy" Boielle (1872–1941) abandoned a less than successful business career for a career in entertainment. He brought concert parties to Jersey, was a key organiser of the Coronation celebrations for Edward VII and George V, noted especially for his part in the organisation of the inaugural Jersey Battle of Flowers, was stage manager of the Caesarean Operatic and Dramatic Society. Boielle also performing as the title rôle in The Mikado, as Sir Joseph Porter in HMS Pinafore, Bunthorne in Patience, Mr Pockett in The Magistrate and others. He was founding Secretary of the Jersey Eisteddfod. He dramatised Charles Dickens' The Haunted Man for the Saint Helier's Church Literary Society (another of Dean Samuel Falle's cultural projects besides the Jersey Eisteddfod) in 1908 and staged it at the Oddfellows' Hall in Saint Helier in December 1908, followed by two public performances in January 1909. The success of these performances persuaded cast and author-director to form a regular company for the production of an annual Dickens stage adaptation: 1909–1910 The Chimes; 1910–1911 The Battle of Life; 1911–1912 The Cricket on the Hearth; 1912–1913 The Christmas Carol; 1913–1914 a revival of The Haunted Man; 1914 Scenes from Pickwick; 1915 The Chimes; 1916 Edwin Drood; 1917 The Battle of Life; 1918 The Old Curiosity Shop; 1919 The Cricket on the Hearth; 1921 Oliver Twist. The Oddfellows' Hall was then turned into a cinema, and the Dickens Players moved to the Opera House for their final productions: 1922 a revival of The Christmas Carol; 1924 David Copperfield. E.C. Boielle's commitments as manager of Wests Picture House and competition from new forms of entertainment led to the suspension of the annual Dickens dramatisations, but members of the amateur troupe moved on to other associations.

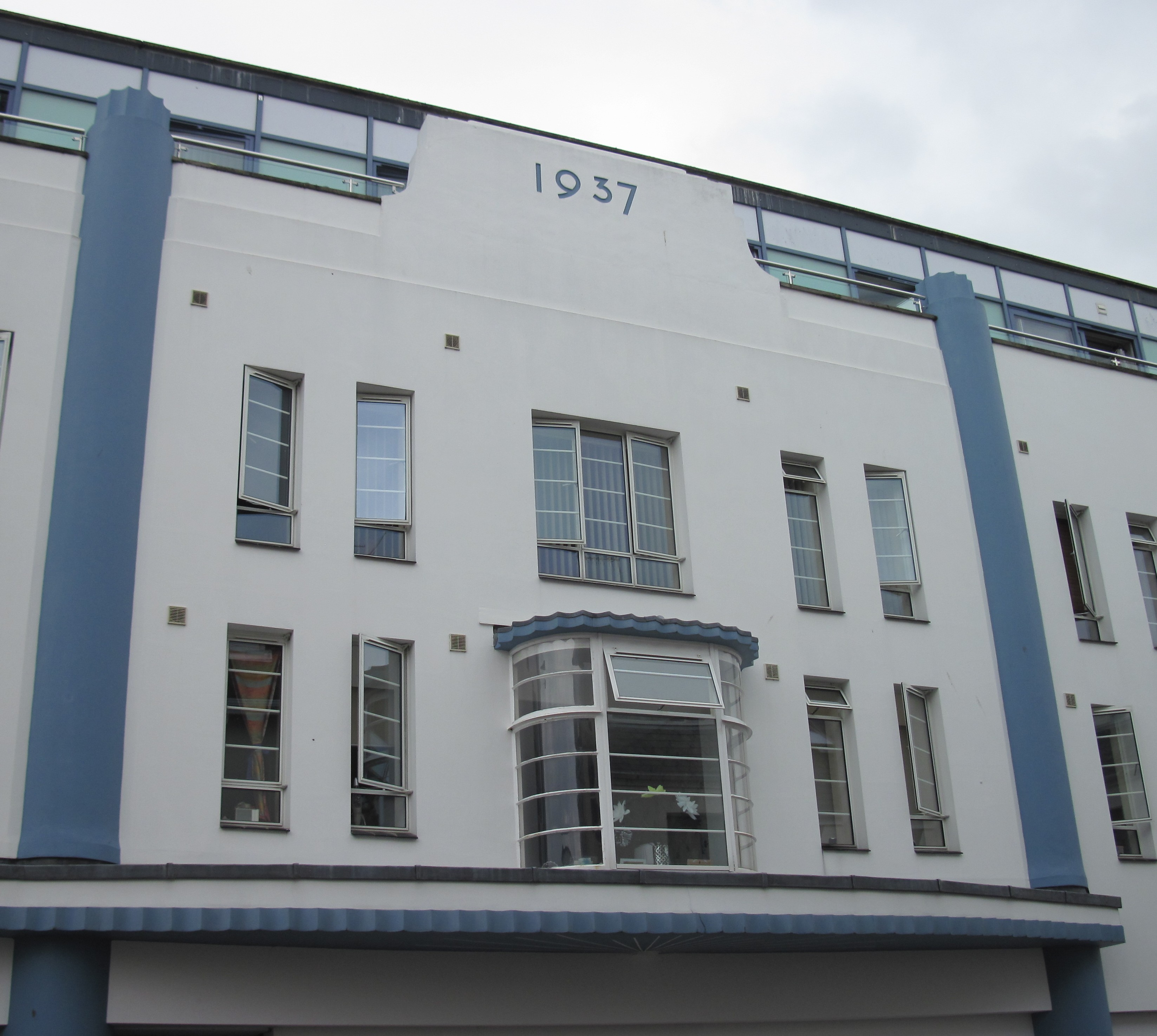
The Play House Apartments preserve part of the Art Deco façade (dated 1937) of the former Playhouse theatre

Besides the Oddfellows' Hall, among the smaller halls used for staged performances at this time was the Cercle St Thomas in New Street, Saint Helier. Originally built in 1819 as the Albion Baptist Chapel, it was acquired in 1842 for use by the French-speaking Roman Catholic congregation as a chapel dedicated to Saint Thomas, in which function it continued until the construction of the large Saint Thomas's Church nearby in 1887 left the chapel redundant. It found new use as a Catholic clubroom with billiard tables and a stage for performances. The Cercle St Thomas building was modernised in 1908 and equipped for showing films. The Jersey Entertainment Society commissioned CW Blanshard Bolton, architect, in 1935 to enlarge the building to house a new theatre. The striking new Art Deco frontage of the New Playhouse was revealed in 1938, and from then until the outbreak of the Second World War a repertory theatre was operated, mostly by actors and crew from England, including Laurence Naismith and Donald Pleasence. In 1946 the Denville Players, a repertory company from England led by Len Laurie and Marjorie Denville, took a lease of the Playhouse from the Brotherhood of Saint Thomas. Laurie and Denville had honeymooned in Jersey in 1925, had liked the Island so much that they returned to perform summer season in the 1930s and only escaped from being stranded during the Occupation by the fact they had refused the offer of the 1939 season. They returned to make their home in Jersey in 1946. They operated the Playhouse theatre until 1963 when the Brotherhood sold the building and it was converted to a retail store.

=== Theatre during the German Occupation (1940–1945) ===
The problem of providing entertainment and maintaining morale under the German Occupation was tackled by Jersey's amateur dramatic societies. The Jersey Opera House, which had been run as a cinema before the war, Wests Picture House, parish halls, church halls and other venues were used for theatrical entertainment. The Playhouse was taken over by the Germans for food storage. By the beginning of 1941 a number of productions were nearing readiness but there was uncertainty as to which company would take the initiative. The Opera House reopened on 6 January 1941 with the Jersey Amateur Dramatic Club's production of Housemaster by Ian Hay, followed on 17 February with a production by the Green Room Club of "The Light of Heart" by Emlyn Williams. A pattern of a new play or theatrical production (revue, variety) every other week was quickly established as associations, such as the Green Room Club, the Amateur Dramatic Club, the Island School of Dancing and Elocution, and the Fifty-Fifty Club, rallied to keep morale up and provide alternative entertainment under conditions of shortage of films and the banning and confiscation of radios. Times of curtain up varied according to the curfew imposed; on occasion when the population were collectively punished for acts of resistance by earlier curfews, the curtain had to rise as early as 6pm. The electricity supply became increasingly erratic. The Opera House was forced to resort to improvised lighting consisting of 3 car headlights in the orchestra pit and lights powered by car batteries in the wings, a system also put into effect at other halls. Appreciation for the actors' efforts were frequently expressed in the form of gifts from audience members in the form of supplements to rations, such as potato flour, sugar beet syrup, butter and other provisions.

Scripts were subject to arbitrary German censorship: innocent remarks were struck out, while blatantly patriotic statements were sometimes passed without objection. The mention of "red, white and blue" was forbidden, and the wearing of military uniforms on stage was prevented. A production of The Merchant of Venice was considered insufficiently anti-Semitic, and the lead actor was summoned by the censor and ordered to act more Jewish and with more venom. Remarks that had been censored were occasionally put back in when the performers thought they could get away with it, and topical ad-libs were quietly inserted. Generally the Germans did not attend these entertainments, although the loneliness and isolation felt by many soldiers impelled them to attend performances even when they were unable to understand the content. Since listening to radio broadcasts was forbidden by the Germans, the latest popular tunes could only be incorporated into shows by clandestine listening and noting down of tunes and lyrics.

In October 1943 a light opera The Paladins, with libretto by Horace Wyatt and music by PG Larbalestier, was mounted. The German censor passed the text despite the inclusion of a stirring and anthemic chorus "Faithful and Free" that became an expression of patriotic longing that produced an emotional response in the audience. When the Germans realised the reaction of audiences the Green Room Club was suppressed, although after some negotiation productions were allowed to resume but only if they were billed as being mounted by the "Dramatic Section" of the Club.

In July 1943 the Opera House and other places of entertainment were ordered to be closed for a month, and again following D-Day on 6 June 1944 until 9 August 1944.

In 1944, the popular German film actress Lil Dagover arrived to entertain German troops in Jersey and Guernsey with a theatre tour to boost morale.

When the electricity supply ended on 25 January 1945, performances at the Opera House ended. Immediately following Liberation on 9 May 1945, the Opera House reopened for a grand variety show on 10 May 1945 for released prisoners.

=== Post-Liberation theatre ===
Following the Liberation in 1945, Springfield Hall regularly hosted trade exhibitions, plays, pantomimes, shows, the Jersey Eisteddfod, and other attractions.

==== Jersey Opera House ====
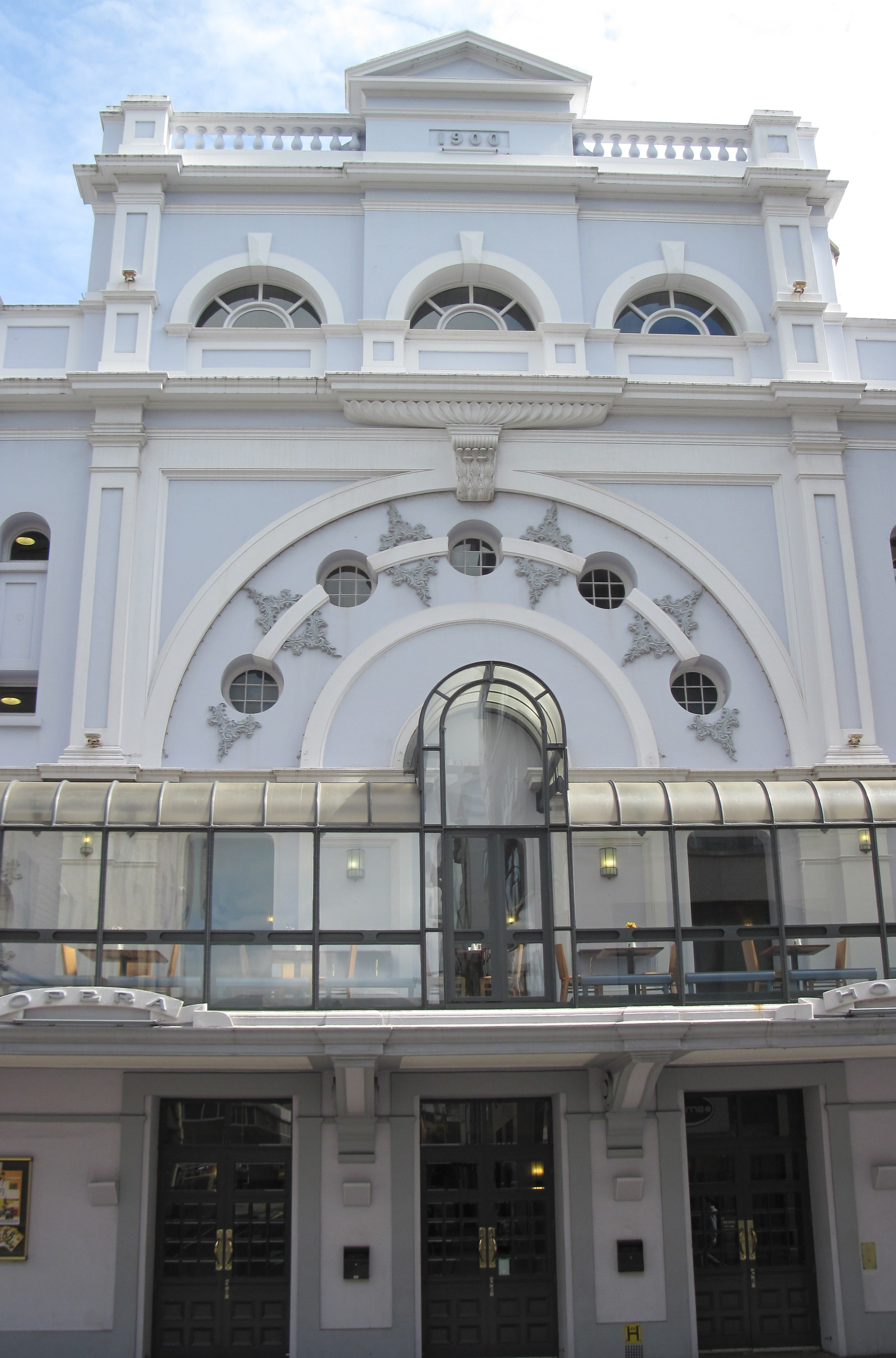
Jersey Opera House

Theatrical impresario Tommy Swanson purchased the Opera House at the end of the 1959 summer season. He undertook major renovations, adding 15 extra boxes, and returning it to live entertainment. Swanson sold the venue to Dick Ray who ran the theatre until selling it to the States of Jersey in 1995 but continued to run the venue until the end of the Jersey Greenroom Clubs pantomime in January 1997.

In 1995 the States of Jersey became the new owner of the Jersey Opera House at a cost of £1.3 million. In January 1997 the theatre closed for a major restoration project. A proposition was presented to the States of Jersey for a loan of £5.5 million to add to the £1.5 million that had been raised by the good will of the people and businesses of Jersey. This was successful and this major programme of work started in August 1998. After an extensive programme of rebuilding and renovation the new theatre opened its door on 9 July 2000 exactly 100 years to the day when the first Opera House had opened its doors to the public of Jersey.

Whole the States of Jersey, Property Holdings, own and looked after the building for the people of Jersey the running of the building and programming was given to Jersey Opera House Ltd, with Jersey Arts Trust (later Arthouse Jersey) being the sole shareholder.

The Opera House closed its doors again in 2020 as areas had become unsafe due to lack of maintenance. Post pandemic it did not re-open while the States of Jersey undertook a further refurbishment (still to be completed at a cost in the region of £11m). It is due to re-open to the public late 2025 or early 2026.

==== Jersey Arts Centre ====
Work on the Jersey Arts Centre started in 1981 when the Education Committee made available the redundant domestic science building in Saint Helier. The complex was opened by the Bailiff in January 1983 and various components of the building were subsequently completed: the Berni Gallery opened later in 1983, and the first performance took place in the shell of the auditorium in January 1985 although the performance space was not completed until August 1986. In 1992 the public acquired the former garrison church of St James and work started in 1998 to convert it into an arts venue. From 2000 the Jersey Arts Centre has undertaken artistic programming for St James. St James was closed in 2013 for a further refurbishment by the States of Jersey and control given to Jersey Youth Service. Jersey Arts Centre was given use of The Old Magistrates Court in 2013 in St Helier Town Hall, until 2016 when the Parish took over use of the space. The Jersey Arts Centre continues to provide a theatrical space in Phillips St, in the 250 seater Benjamin Meaker Theatre, as well as performances in Care Homes, Historic Sites and Tours to the Other Islands and Europe.

As well as providing a space for both visiting professional and local amateur performers Jersey Arts Centre also has 3 in house performance groups (Junior Drama, Youtheatre and ACT) Since 2016 Jersey Arts Centre has produced a local community Christmas show as well as collaboration with groups and schools across the Island.

During COVID the Jersey Arts Centre moved its output from live events onto web events and maintained active through the pandemic - and although the theatre space was closed (when required by law) for 45 weeks . When it reopened it was able to start socially spaced performances for 20 people in the 250 seater auditorium.

==== Controversy ====
The Bailiff's powers of theatrical censorship were the subject of controversy during the term of office of Sir Peter Crill who refused permission for a visiting amateur theatre group to perform Howard Brenton's play Christie in Love and required changes to the staging of a production of Shakespeare's Coriolanus by the Tricycle Theatre Company to prevent an actor's naked buttocks being visible to the audience. On several occasions, however, 'he suggested that the role of chief censor should not lie with him, but should be at taken on by the elected members of the States'.

== Theatre in Jèrriais ==
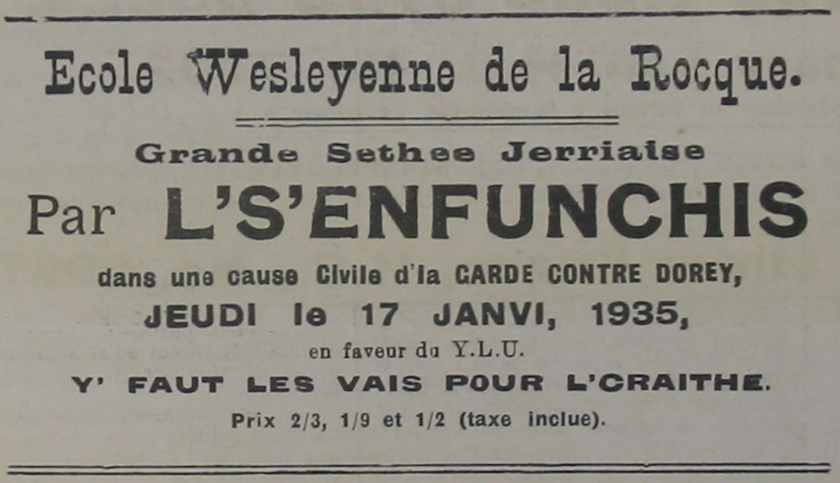
Advertisement for a play in Jèrriais, 1935

The development of Jèrriais literature has included theatre in Jèrriais (the Norman dialect spoken in Jersey). The first book published in Jèrriais Rimes et Poësies Jersiaises (1865) included dramatic duologues, which may have been performed at traditional veil'yes (social neighbourhood gatherings) or read as closet dramas. Satirical playlets were also published in newspapers in the 19th century. Élection de St. Martin, a playlet in Jèrriais and French published in the newspaper Le Constitutionnel on 24 November 1838, was probably never staged, but rather read in company.

Henri Luce Manuel's Queur de Femme (in modern spelling: Tchoeu d'Femme – "heart of a woman") of 1861 was published in pamphlet form. Esther Le Hardy's three-act play L'Enchorchelai, ou les très Paires (in modern spelling: L'Enchorchélé, ou les Trais Paithes – "The Bewitched, or the Three Pears") was published in 1880. Both plays are in rhyming couplets.

In the early 20th century, E. J. Luce wrote plays and presented them around parish halls and other halls. En chèrche d'femme, L'Învitâtion and L'Annonce X Y Z were all written before the First World War, subsequent to the setting up of the Jersey Eisteddfod. The most frequently performed of his plays Lé Procès was published in pamphlet form and was revived as a touring fundraiser during the First World War, remaining a favourite long after.

During the German military Occupation of Jersey 1940–1945, the inability of the Germans to understand Jèrriais enabled the performance of dramas that would otherwise not have passed the censor. A Jèrriais play performed at a parish hall was "as patriotic as could possibly be" but the Germans who attended the production did not understand it.

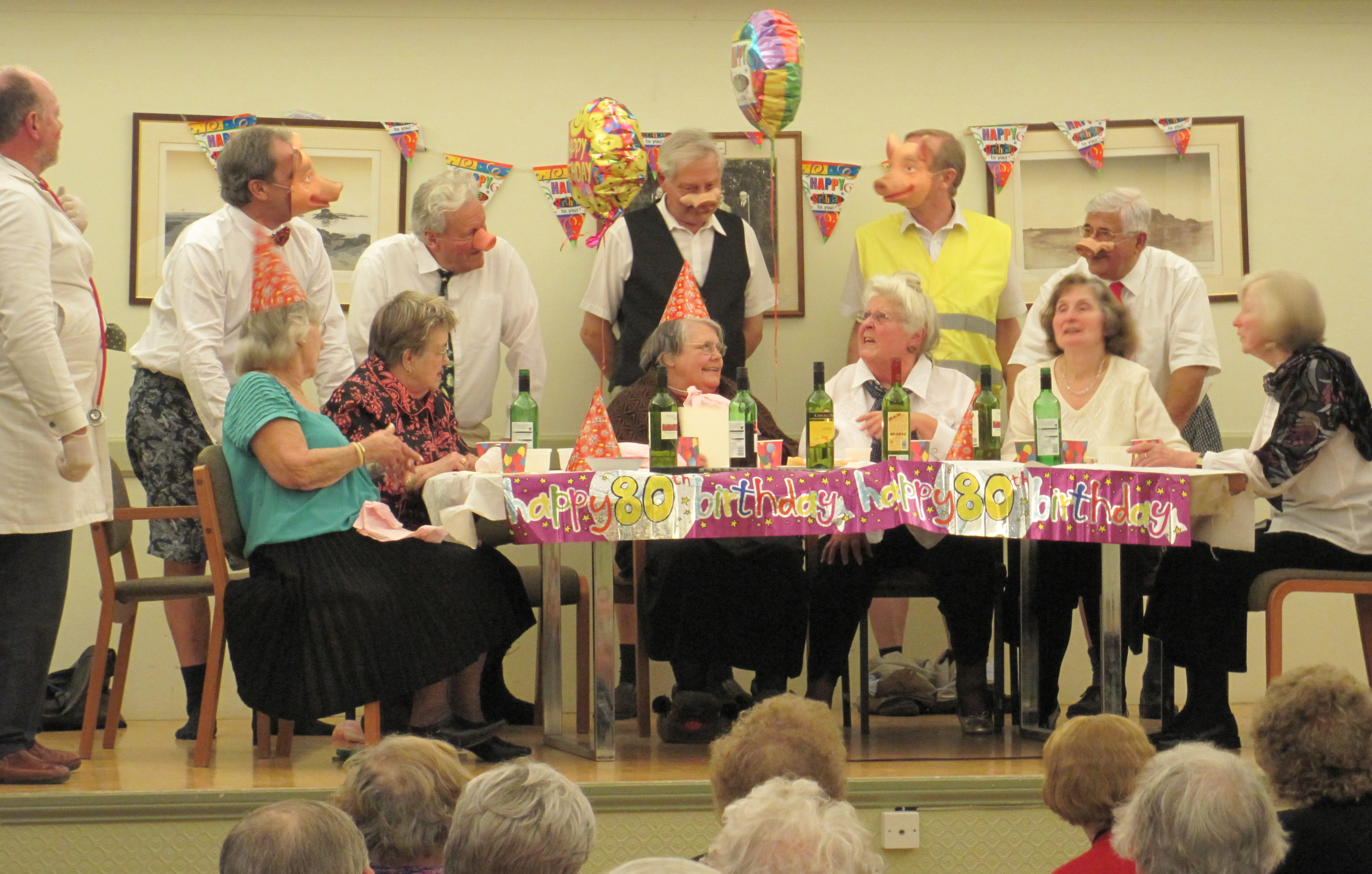
Performance of a playlet in Jèrriais in 2010 in Saint Martin's Public Hall

George F. Le Feuvre took part in amateur dramatic performances, including in works by E. J. Luce, as a young man. Later in life he wrote plays for performance by L'Assembliée d'Jèrriais and at the Jersey Eisteddfod. 8 plays and 2 duologues written by him between 1946 and 1968 were published as a collection in Histouaithes et Gens d'Jèrri (1976). Amelia Perchard (1921–2012) was one of Jersey's foremost contemporary writers, writing many one-act plays for performance at the Jersey Eisteddfod.

== Actors and dramatists from Jersey ==
Lillie Langtry, the Jersey Lily, is the island's most widely recognised cultural icon. Other stage actors from Jersey have included Seymour Hicks, Ivy St. Helier, Alma Stanley and Sylvestra Le Touzel.

Playwright Frederick Lonsdale was born in Jersey.

Henry Cavill who played Superman
