= William E. Sheridan =

American actor

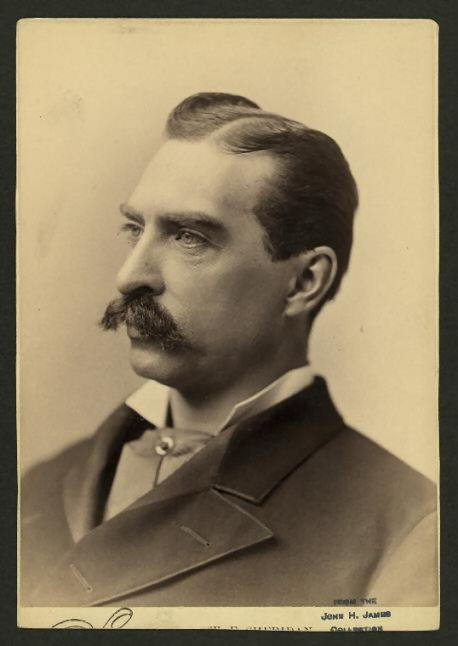
- New York Public Library Digital Gallery
- Born: William Edward Sheridan; June 1, 1839; Boston, Massachusetts
- Died: May 18, 1887 (aged 47); Sydney, Australia
- Other name: W. E. Sheridan
- Occupation: Stage Actor

William E. Sheridan (June 1, 1839 – May 18, 1887) was an American stage actor and Civil War veteran, active on stage from 1858 until his death in 1887. Sheridan was a respected actor who played both lead and supporting roles, but was probably best suited when cast as the villain.

== Early life ==
William Edward Sheridan was born in Boston, Massachusetts, where in his late teens he clerked for several years at Benjamin Loring & Co., a stationery store on State Street. He made his stage debut at Boston’s Howard Athenaeum on March 15, 1858, as Robin in Thomas Morton's five-act comedy, Town and Country. After a period with John A. Ellsler at the Cleveland Academy of Music, Sheridan found a niche in the fall of 1859 playing villains at Pike's Opera House, Cincinnati, remaining there until war broke out between the States. He enlisted in the spring of 1861 at Cincinnati with the Sixth Ohio Infantry and rose to the rank of captain before a sniper’s bullet fractured a forearm during the Battle of Resaca, Georgia. Though a skilled army surgeon ultimately saved his arm, the wound would plague him for the rest of life.

== Career ==
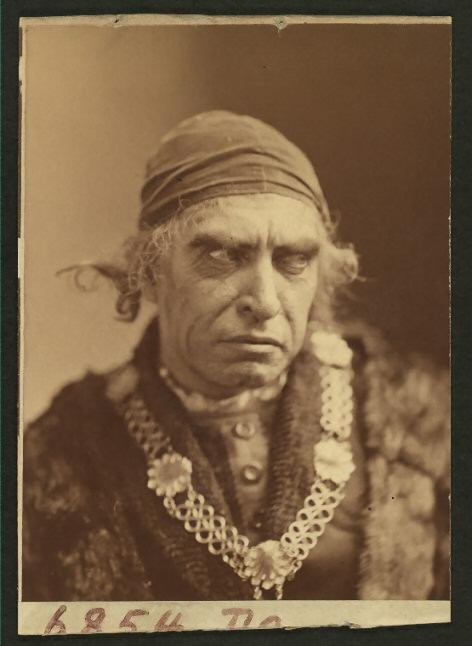
Sheridan as King Louis XI

In July, 1865 Sheridan made his debut at Niblo's Garden, New York in Dion Boucicault's Arrah Na Pouge, playing Beamish McGoul with Thomas Henry Glenney (his American debut) as Shawn the Post, Josephine Orton as Arrah Mellish and Mary Wells playing Katy. When Edwin Forrest began his engagement at Niblo's that September, Sheridan would fill in as his substitute on the actor’s off days. Sheridan later returned as a lead actor to Pike's Opera House until the theatre was consumed by fire in March 1866. Over the following several seasons Sheridan was associated with theatres in St. Louis, Washington D. C., Boston, New Orleans and Philadelphia. In November 1867 he received praise for his interpretation of Captain Hawtree in the T. W. Robertson play Caste at the National Theatre, Washington D. C. By 1870 he was the lead actor at the Chestnut Street Theatre, Philadelphia, and by the early 1870s Sheridan was a member of Edwin Booth's company at Booth's Theatre, New York performing second lead in Shakespearean tragedies.

Sheridan toured with stock companies headed by the comedian John T. Raymond, actress Julia Dean and British actors Mr. and Mrs. Rousby (William Wybert Rousby and Clara Marion Jesse Dowse). and had played the leading man opposite actresses Lucille Western, Charlotte Thompson (1843-1898), Adele Belgarde (d. 1938, mother of film director David Butler) and had appeared in England with McKee and Kitty Rankin playing The Parson in Joaquin Miller's The Danites in the Sierras.

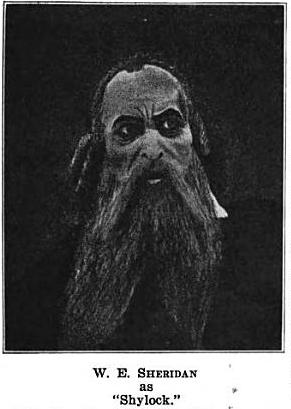
Sheridan as Shylock

Reportedly, Sheridan was most at ease when he starred in productions of Casimir Delavigne's Louis XI and John Brougham's The Duke's Motto. The role he was most identified with over his career was as Joseph Fioretti, a part he played numerous times in Leonard Grover's farce melodrama, Our Boarding House. Sheridan was also remembered for his renditions of Hamlet, Richard III, Cardinal Richelieu and other classical and contemporary roles played over a near thirty-year career.

== Personal life ==
Sheridan married Sarah E. Hayes in Boston on September 1, 1864. On the night of August 30, 1872, she was one of the estimated seventy souls lost when the passenger steamer Metis sank off the coast of Watch Hill, Rhode Island after colliding with the schooner Nettie Cushing. At some point Sheridan remarried, but divorced in the early 1880s to wed his leading lady, Louise Davenport (c. 1842–1901), a native of Toronto. Some time after Sheridan's death, Davenport fell into a grim poverty that was fueled by what would prove to be a fatal drug addiction, a fate suffered earlier by her sister, actress Etta Waters.

== Death ==
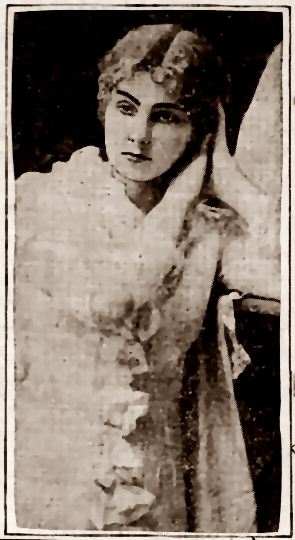
Louise Davenport

In the early 1880s, Sheridan's tours of the American West Coast and Australia were met with success and in 1886 he returned to Australia but never appeared on stage, though Davenport did play "Lina Nelson" in G. R. Sims' The Harbour Lights at the Princess Theatre, Melbourne on 26 February 1887. By this time Sheridan’s health had been in decline for some time. His condition, even before his departure for Australia, would at times leave him too frail to take to the stage. The end came in the early morning hours of May 18, 1887, in Sydney, just a few hours after suffering a stroke as he sat in the audience of a local theatre.

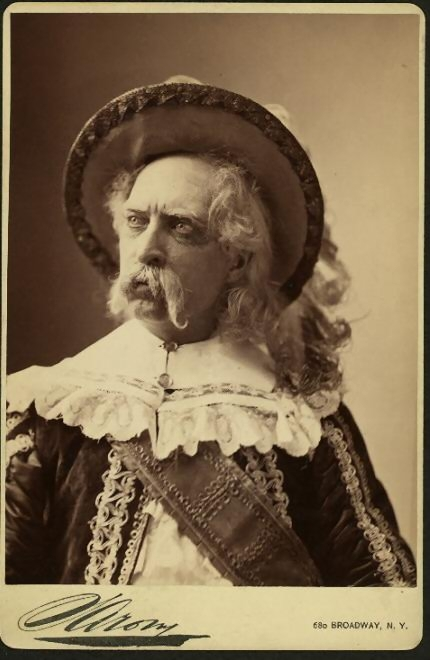
Sheridan in character

That October, Sheridan's widow along with a group of friends and admirers dedicated a modest monument at Sydney's Waverley Cemetery to commemorate the actor's life. Situated atop a bluff overlooking the Tasman Sea, the monument's inscription reads:

In the Memory of William Edward Sheridan, Tragedian.

Died May 18, 1887, Aged 48 Years.

Oh for the touch of a vanished hand
And the sound of a voice that is still.

He was -
Words are wanting to say what

Say what is just and kind.

And he was that-

== Legacy ==
In his book, Old Times Rocks: Golden Days Recalled (1914), Herbert Stanley Renton (1854–1939) wrote:

I have spoken incidentally only of actors in general, my theme being the actors of tragic roles and the greatest of these to my thinking was William E. Sheridan, for the simple reason that he forgot Sheridan and lived the character he impersonated. There were none just like him.

David Belasco, on actors he'd directed in productions of Shakespeare's The Merchant of Venice:

Among the great players of Shylock for whom it has been my fortune to direct the stage and to rehearse the immortal drama of which he is the central and pervasive figure are McCullough, Barrett, Sullivan, Booth, and, by no means least, William E. Sheridan.
