= How McDougall Topped the Score =

1924 film

- Directed by: Victor Upton-Brown
- Written by: Victor Upton Brown
- Based on: poem by Thomas Edward Spencer
- Production company: Pacific Screen Plays
- Release date: 10 November 1927
- Running time: 5 reels
- Country: Australia
- Languages: Silent film English intertitles
- Budget: £800

How McDougall Topped the Score is a 1924 Australian silent film directed by Victor Upton-Brown. It is based on a famous poem by Thomas Edward Spencer about a cricket match won when a dog steals a ball, enabling the batting team to score plenty of runs.

It is considered a lost film.

== Plot ==
A cricket match takes place in the country between the towns of Piper's Flat and Molongo. They placed a bet for the other team to pay for the lunch after the game. When Pipers Flat needs one more player, they ask Old McDougal if he could help them out. When the game started Molongo started a winning streak and pipers flat gave up hope they'll win. But when McDougal came on to the pitch and hit the ball his dog Pincher comes out on the field enabling Dougal To score 50 runs in the game to win

== Cast ==
- Leslie Gordon as McDougall
- Ida Gresham as Mrs McDougall
- Dorothy May as Mary McDougall
- Wesley Barry as McDougall Jr
- Frank Blandford as Johnstone
- William Ralston as Brady
- Joy Thompson
- Pincher

== Production ==
The film was shot in the Melbourne suburb of Ashburton and on location in the Dandenong Ranges. It was the first feature from Pacific Screen Plays, an Australian and New Zealand company.

== Release ==
The film was previewed in October and made its debut in Adelaide on 10 November 1924 to coincide with the first match between the South Australian cricket team and a visiting English side. However it does not appear to have had a wide release.
