= Charles Hope Nicolson =

Scottish settler, lawman & police magistrate (1829-1898)

Charles Hope Nicolson P.M.
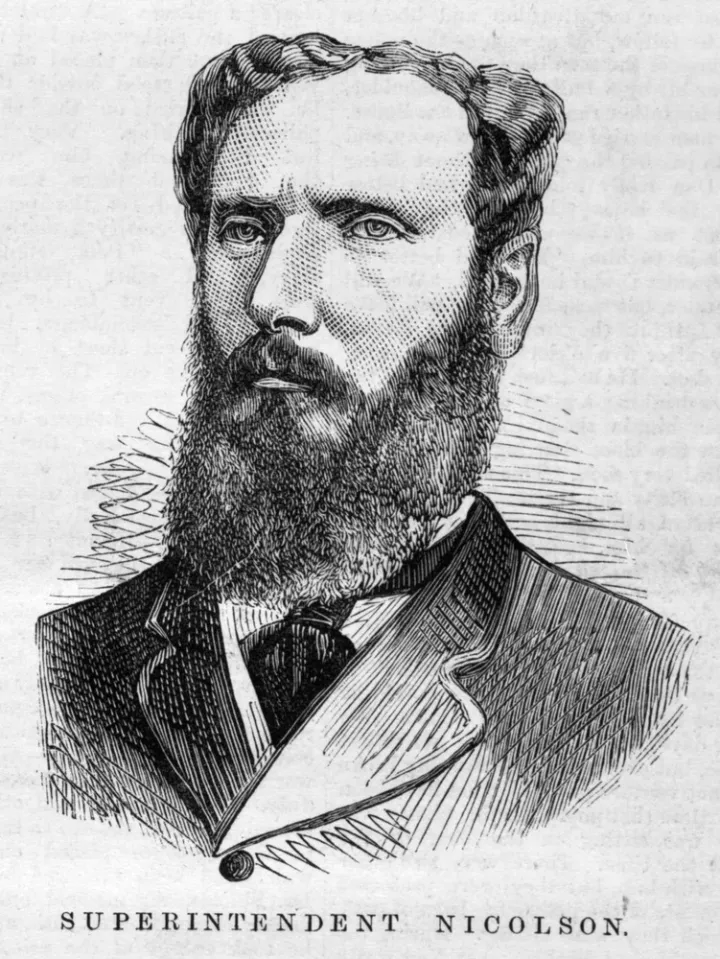
- Born: 1829; Scotland, United Kingdom
- Died: 30 July 1898 (aged ~ 69); Melbourne, Colony of Victoria
- Police career
- Rank: Superintendent

Charles Hope Nicolson (1829–1898) was a Scottish settler, lawman and police magistrate in the colony of Victoria.

== Life ==
He was born in Scotland, and joined the Victorian police as a cadet officer in 1852 with several others who afterwards attained high rank in the force. Amongst them were the chief commissioner, Chomley, J. Lyddiard, Sadleir, Reginald Greene, Winch, William Templeton, Leopold Kabat, and others. From the first he showed great zeal and enthusiasm for duty, and one of his earliest exploits was in an encounter with bushrangers when stationed at Kilmore. A gang of Tasmanian escapees had crossed the Straits, and taken to the roads in Victoria, their favourite haunts being the old Sydney-road and the track between Kilmore and McIvor. In company with H. Thompson, another cadet, and a couple of troopers, Nicolson went in pursuit, and halted one day for lunch at a roadside hotel. They left Thompson in charge of the horses at the stable, and while they were at lunch the bushrangers, not suspecting the presence of the police, rode up. Seeing Thompson in uniform, they at once fired, shooting him through the chest and lungs, and galloped off. The others rushed to their horses, started in pursuit, and, coming up with the outlaws, exchanged shots, Nicolson and Sergeant-Major Nolan being the first to get to close quarters. They each picked their man, and, being armed only with the old type of horse-pistol, there was not much shooting. Nicolson, without firing at all, rushed his man, seized him by the back of the neck, dragged him from the saddle, and so captured him.

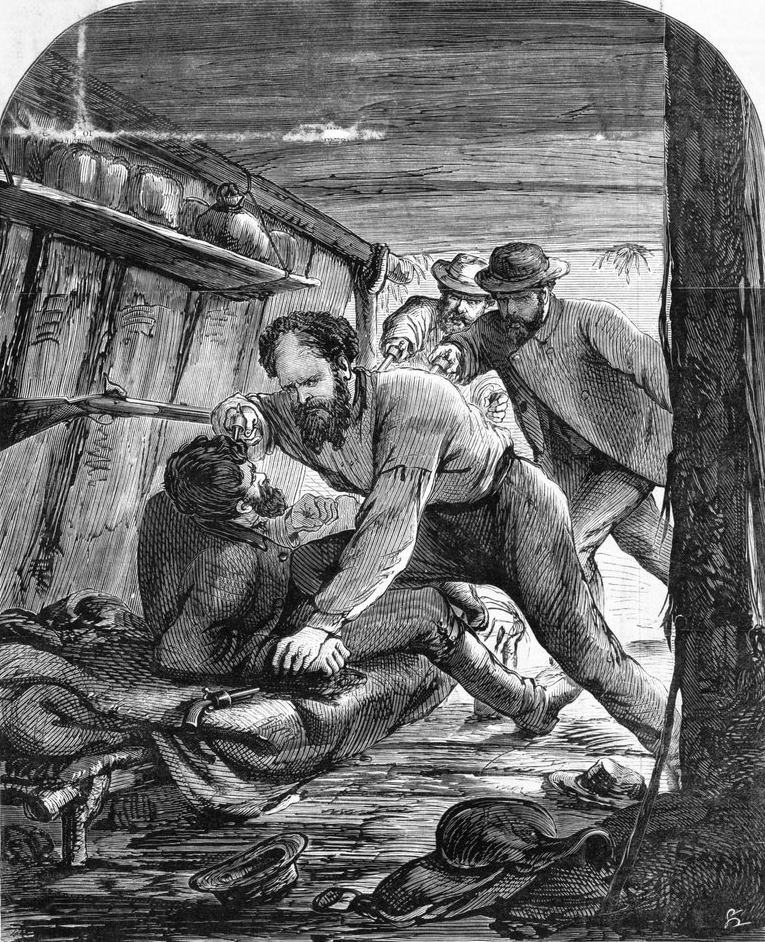
Capture of Power, June 1870

Another of his achievements was the capture of Power, the bushranger, effected in company with Hare and Montford. Having traced Power to a hut in the ranges, Nicolson rushed in and threw himself on the bushranger, who was lying on his bunk with a loaded gun beside him.

=== The hunt for the Kelly hang ===
When on 27 October 1878, the Kellys committed their first murder on the King River, Nicolson and Sadleir went to Benalla in charge of the police pursuit, Nicolson being the senior officer. He conducted operations against the gang until the Euroa bank robbery on 12 September of the same year, at which time his health broke down, and he returned to Melbourne, Hare taking his place until June of the following year. The want of success which at first attended the chase for the bushrangers is an old story. False trails were laid for the police by sympathisers, who lived on the Kellys as long as the spoil from their bank robberies lasted. A year was spent in unsuccessful methods, and in June 1879, Nicolson went up to the Kelly country determined this time to apprehend the gang.

Towards the end of the pursuit of the Kellys, the Government of the day controversially deprived Nicolson of the command of the operations. The Kelly gang had become desperate, and, harassed by the importunities of their friends, who wanted more stolen gold, had no other resource than to make a break somewhere in the hope of sticking up another bank. Nicolson protested against what he and his friends considered a great wrong, and begged for another month in which he assured the authorities he must come to quarters with the Kellys. It was useless; he was brought away from Benalla, and had only been two days out of the district when one of his scouts brought word that the Kellys, having been completely cornered, were about to break for the open, and had made themselves bullet-proof armour of stolen ploughshares. This occurred on Friday. On the following Sunday night Aaron Sherritt, one of the police spies, was shot dead by the Kellys, and their destruction at Glenrowan a few days later was the end of the story—although Nicolson, to his chagrin, had no share in the reward.

==== Aftermath ====
Another perceived injustice which he and his friends felt sorely was done him when the Police Commission, in its subsequent inquiries, determined that both he and Hare should be transferred to other branches of the service, and, as a consequence he was appointed a police magistrate, a duty which he discharged up to within a few days of his last illness.

=== Death ===
Nicolson died of heart disease at South Yarra, Melbourne, on 30 July 1898, aged about 69. He died leaving behind him a grown family. His remains were interred in the afternoon of 31 July in the St Kilda Cemetery. A very large number of the friends of the deceased were present at his residence, Anderson-street, South Yarra. His Excellency the Administrator of the Government sent his carriage. A mass of wreaths and other forms of flower emblems were received. The Rev. Canon Tucker officiated at the grave, in the midst of a gathering of representative men, including Panton, P.M., and other stipendiary magistrates; Chomley, Chief Commissioner of Police; the Mayor of Melbourne, E. G. Fitzgibbon, chairman of the Metropolitan Board of Works, ex-Inspecting Superintendent Sadleir, and many old colleagues of the deceased, besides a group of other private friends. By the desire of the family, carrying out Nicolson's own views, there were no pall-bearers, and two of his sons were the chief mourners. Sub-Inspector Sharp and Sergeant Keane, court orderly, who were in close official association with the deceased, were invited to occupy the mourning coach following the carriage of the Administrator of the Government. The funeral arrangements were in the hands of R. Matthews, of Toorak-road, South Yarra.

=== Personal life ===
On 22 May 1861, at St. James's Cathedral, Melbourne, Charles Hope Nicholson, Esq. was married to Helen Elizabeth Smith, eldest daughter of John Thomas Smith, Esq., Mayor of Melbourne.

== Legacy ==
In the 1923 silent film When the Kellys Were Out, Nicholson was played by Dunstan Webb.

In the 1951 film, The Glenrowan Affair, he was played by Charles Tasman. The film incorrectly depicts Nicholson as being the Chief Commissioner of Victoria Police at the time of the Kelly Outbreak. In reality, the position was held by Frederick Standish.

In the 1970 film Ned Kelly, he was played by Ken Goodlet.

In the 1980 miniseries The Last Outlaw, he was played by John Stone.

== Sources ==
- "Nicolson, Charles Hope (1829–1898)". Obituaries Australia. Australian National University.

Attribution:

- "Death of Mr. Nicholson, P.M." The Argus. 1 August 1898. p. 7.
- "Marriages. Nicolson—Smith". The Argus. 29 May 1861. p. 4.
