= Robert Inman (actor) =

New Zealand actor

Robert Inman (c. 1863 – 26 September 1940) was an actor from Dunedin, New Zealand, who had a substantial career in Australia.

== History ==
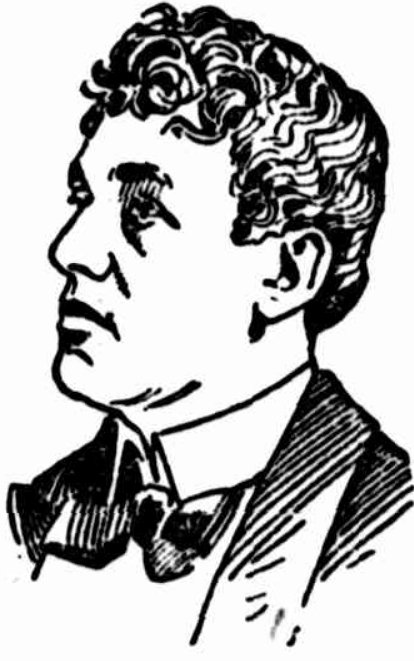
Robert Inman 1899

Inman was born in Dunedin, New Zealand, a son of Robert E. Inman who was a theatrical manager in Australia and dead by 1899. but of whom nothing more has come to light.

He left New Zealand at age 17 to pursue a career on the stage.

He was with Essie Jenyns' company 1887–1888, notably playing Romeo to Jenyns' Juliet at the Criterion Theatre, Sydney on 23 June 1888. Charles Holloway, too, was passing "younger" roles to Inman, and not regretting having done so. He also played:

- Mercutio for Mrs Brown-Potter and Kyrle Bellew at the Theatre Royal;
- Lord Fellamar in Joseph's Sweetheart for Robert Brough and Dion Boucicault;
- The title role in Hamilton Aidé's comedy Dr Bill for James Williamson and George Musgrove;
- Clifford Vaughan in Called Back; Clifford Armytage, in The Lights o' London; James Gordon, in Man to Man; and Gideon Blake, in Pettit and Sims' In the Ranks for George Rignold.
- David Englehart in Charles Darrell's When London Sleeps, at the Theatre Royal, for Charles Holloway and William Anderson.

He formed his own company September 1897 – April 1898, playing Wilton Jones' A Yorkshire Lass, Dr Bill, William Gillette's Held By the Enemy and The Girl I Left Behind Me by David Belasco and Franklin Fyles, including a four-month season in New Zealand.

=== 20th century ===
He played in companies led by Charles Holloway 1905–1907; William Anderson 1908–1916; and George Marlow 1909–1913.

Inman acted in at least one film, The Kelly Gang (1920) as Aaron Sherritt.

== Family ==
Three generations of Robert Inman:

House decorator Robert Ethelbert Inman ( – 31 March 1863) married Lydia, lived in Melbourne, had shop at 16 Swanston Street. He died in Dunedin, New Zealand.

- Melbourne theatrical manager Robert Inman ( – ) of whom only vague references have been found. Died before 1899.
  - Robert Ethelbert Inman (c. 1863 – 26 September 1940) married Maud Mary Appleton (1867 – 6 October 1948), daughter of Frederick Appleton in October 1892. Maud was an actress, appeared in The Kelly Gang as Mrs Kelly. They had a home at Hawthorn, Victoria, later 22 Graylings Grove, St Kilda, Victoria.
    - Adeline Ethelbert "Adele" Inman (1895 – 16 July 1981) married William Anstruther Fletcher on 8 December 1923. Adele, who played Kate Kelly in The Kelly Gang, is frequently described as their only daughter, but there was another, Marjorie, who died young.
