= Constance Robertson =

Australian journalist (1895–1964)

Constance (Connie) Robertson OBE (1895–1964) was an Australian journalist best known as women's editor of the Sydney Morning Herald.

== Early life and career ==
Robertson was born on 16 October 1895 in Sydney. She was the eldest of six children of Constance (née Ivingsbelle) and Alfred George Stephens, literary critic for The Bulletin. She was educated by her father and then worked on The Bookfellow from 1911–1916. In 1917 she moved to the Sydney Sun.

Robertson edited Woman's Budget from 1930 to 1936, before becoming editor of the women's supplement of the Sydney Morning Herald (and later of the Sunday Herald and the Sun-Herald).

She was an accredited war correspondent in World War II. She continued to write a weekly column for the Herald after she retired in April 1962.

== Personal life and death ==
She married journalist William Kinnear Robertson on 25 July 1928. Robertson died of cerebrovascular disease at North Sydney on 3 March 1964. Her husband predeceased her a few days earlier. She was survived by her daughter Margot.

== Recognition and legacy ==
Robertson was appointed an Officer of the British Empire in 1955. She has been inducted into the Australian Media Hall of Fame. Her papers are held at the State Library of NSW.
