= Alfred Stephens =

Australian writer and literary critic

A. G. Stephens
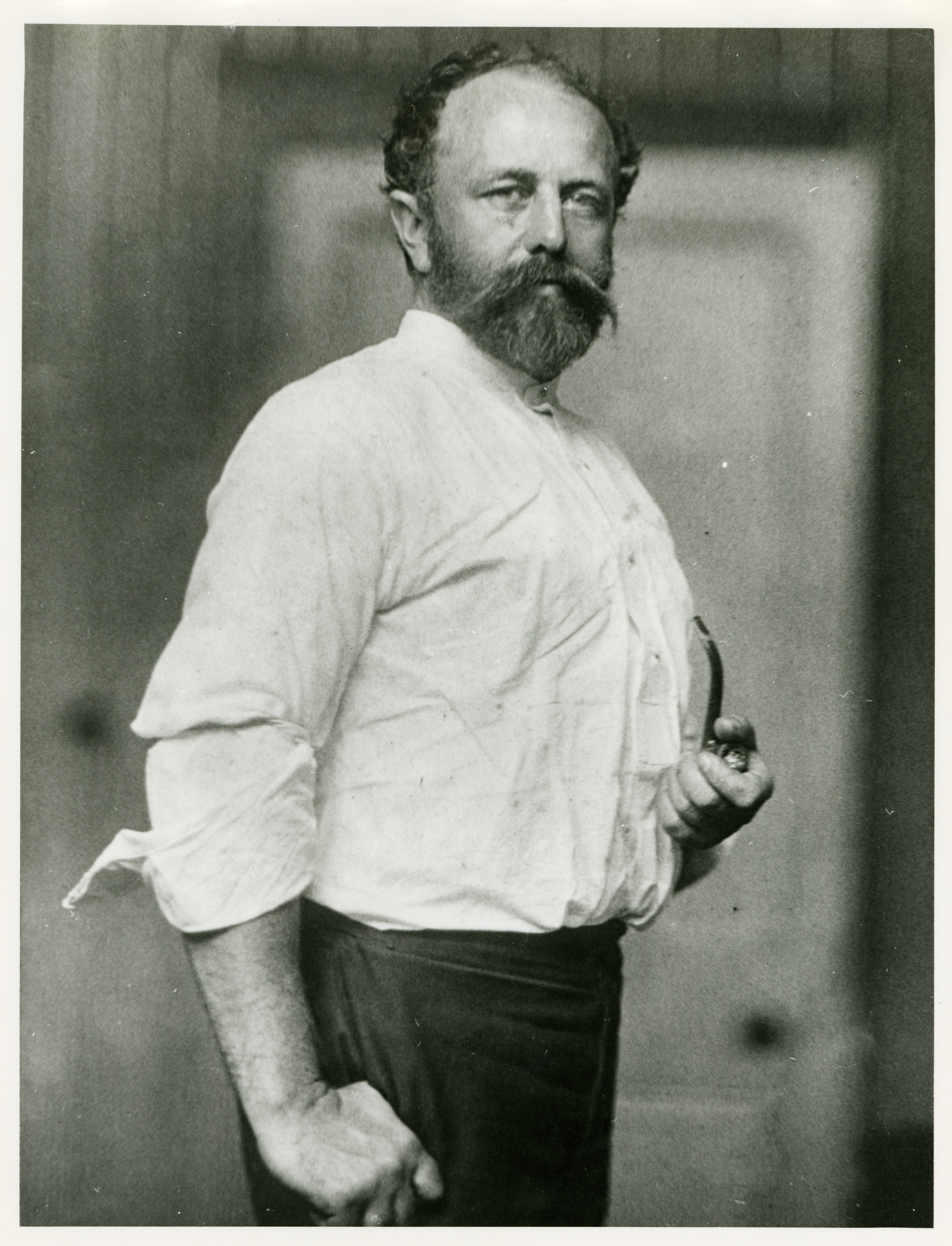
- Born: Alfred George Stephens; 28 August 1865; Toowoomba, Queensland, Australia
- Died: 15 April 1933 (aged 67); Darlinghurst, New South Wales, Australia
- Writing career
- Language: English
- Genre: literary criticism

Alfred George Stephens (28 August 1865 – 15 April 1933), commonly referred to as A. G. Stephens, was an Australian writer and literary critic, notably for The Bulletin. He was appointed to that position by its owner, J. F. Archibald in 1894.

== Early life and journalism ==
Stephens was born on 28 August 1865 in Tooowomba to Samuel George and Euphemia Tweedle Stephens, members of a pioneering family of the area. He was educated at the Toowoomba Grammar School, and then started an apprenticeship in the printing trade with The Toowoomba Chronicle.

In 1892 he won a prize of £25 for an essay "Why North Queensland Wants Separation", published in 1893, and in this year was also published "The Griffilwraith" ('An Independent Criticism of the Methods and Manoeuvres of the Queensland Coalition. Government, 1890–1893'), an able piece of pamphleteering attacking the coalition of the old rivals, Sir Samuel Griffith and Sir Thomas McIlwraith.

== The Bulletin ==
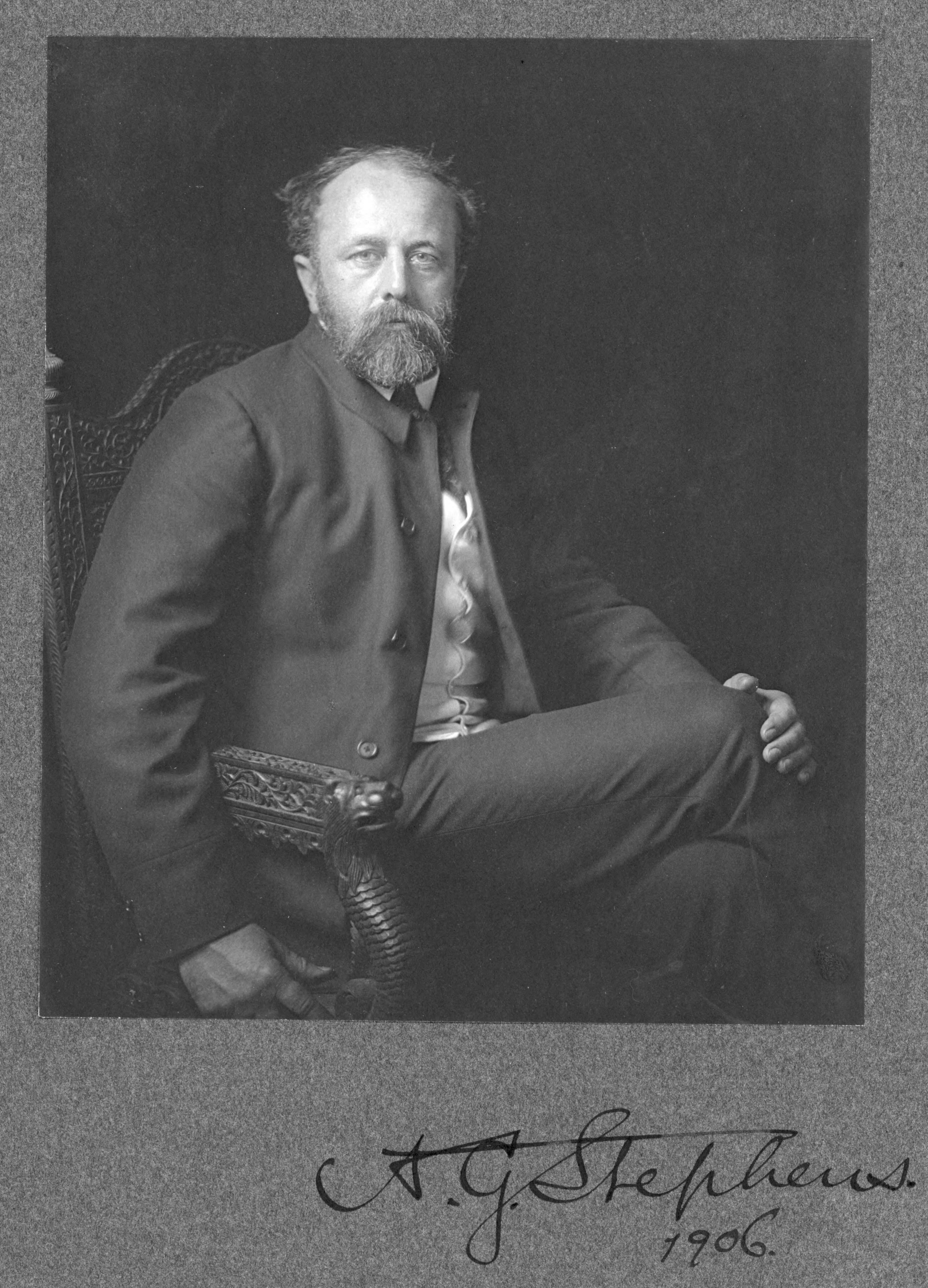
Alfred Stephens

In April 1893 having sold his share in the Cairns paper he left Australia for San Francisco, travelled across the continent, and thence to Great Britain and France. He had begun to do some journalistic work in London when he received the offer from J. F. Archibald of a position on The Bulletin. He returned to Australia and arrived at Sydney in January 1894. His account of his travels, "A Queenslander's Travel Notes", published in that year, though bright enough in its way suggests a curiously insensitive Stephens.

Stephens was an active editor between the years 1897–1904, working on sixteen books of poetry, as well as Such is Life, Rudd's 1899 On Our Selection and Bulletin Story Book. He was also the author of The Pearl and the Octopus, The Lady Calphurnia Royal (with Albert Dorrington), The Red Pagan, Oblation, and Bill's Ideas (1913).

== Later career ==
In September 1906, newspapers suggested Stephens was going to London where it was expected he would remain, but this was confusion with another Stephens. In October 1906 however 'Red Page' Stephens had left The Bulletin; the exact reason for the break has never been known. (Note: Norman Lindsay in Bohemians of the Bulletin claims that Stephens, after his return from a visit to Europe, demanded a raise in pay, which he was refused. He resigned 'in a fit of pique'. Lindsay adds that Stephens 'was a fool to leave... and they were bigger fools to let him go...') He initially set up a bookshop.

For the remaining 27 years of his life Stephens was a freelance writer, excepting a brief period as a leader writer on the Wellington Post in 1907. In 1914 he penned, with music, work entitled "The Australian National Anthem".

Over time, he undertook criticism of Henry Kendall (1839–1882) and Christopher Brennan (1870–1932). He recognised the works of poet Shaw Neilson (1872–1942). High praise was also given to the works of Scottish-Australian poet and bush balladeer Will H. Ogilvie (1869–1963). Despite the volume of written verse, Stephens considered his own work to be no more than "quite good rhetorical verse"; whilst he was considered a good interviewer and critic.

Stephens and his wife, Constance Ivings Belle Stephens, had six children, two sons Dr J. G., D. G., and four daughters, including Cynthia, Alison, and Alwyn. Eldest daughter Constance Robertson (1895–1964) was at one time the editor of Women's Budget.

Stephens died in Sydney, on 15 April 1933, only a day after his 90-year-old mother died in Toowoomba. He was survived by his widow and children. Stephens' wife died in November 1934, and was cremated.

== Publications ==
=== Anthologies edited ===
- The Bulletin Reciter: A Collection of Verses for Recitation from the Bulletin 1880-1901 (1901)
- The Bulletin Story Book : A Selection of Stories and Literary Sketches from the Bulletin 1880–1901 (1901)
- Anzac Memorial (1916)

== Bibliography ==
- Cantrell, Leon (ed.) (1977). A. G. Stephens : selected writings. Angus and Robertson. ISBN 0-207-13244-5.
- Lindsay, Norman. (1973). 'A. G. Stephens' in Bohemians of the Bulletin. Angus and Robertson. ISBN 0-207-12946-0. Lindsay's portrait of A. G. Stephens the man is unflattering: Lindsay writes that there was 'an enmity' between them that lasted until Stephens' death. Nonetheless, Lindsay firmly declares Stephens' 'important place in the literary tradition of this country.'
- Miller, E. Morris. (1973). Australian literature from its beginnings to 1935 : a descriptive and bibliographical survey of books by Australian authors in poetry, drama, fiction, criticism and anthology with subsidiary entries to 1938. Sydney University Press. ISBN 0-424-06920-2
- Palmer, Vance. (1941) A. G. Stephens, His Life and Work. Melbourne, Robertson and Mullins.
- Stephensen, P. R. (1940). The life and works of A.G. Stephens ("The Bookfellow") : a lecture, delivered to the Fellowship of Australian Writers, Sydney, 10 March 1940. Self-published.
- Rolfe, Patricia. (1979). 'Rhadamanthus of the Red Page' in The Journalistic Javelin. Sydney, Wildcat Press. ISBN 0-908463-02-2.
- The Sydney Morning Herald, 17 April 1933
