= When the Kellys Were Out =

1923 film

- Directed by: Harry Southwell
- Produced by: Harry Southwell
- Starring: Harry Southwell
- Cinematography: Tasman Higgins
- Production company: Australian Players Film Company
- Release date: 9 July 1923
- Running time: 8 reels
- Country: Australia
- Languages: Silent film English intertitles

When the Kellys Were Out is a 1923 Australian feature-length film directed by Harry Southwell about Ned Kelly. Only part of the film survives today.

== Plot ==
Constable Fitzpatrick arrives at the Kelly house, to accuse Dan Kelly of cattle duffing. He is met by Kate Kelly, Dan's sister, and is taken by her beauty. Mrs Kelly tries to prevent the arrest and Ned arrives. A quarrel ensues in which Fitzpatrick is attacked, and Ned flees. He joins with Steve Hary, Joe Byrne and Dan Kelly and escapes to a hide out.

Ned hears that his mother has been arrested and forms a hatred for the police. He and his gang hold up Younghusband Station and just escape the police. Then there are the Wombat murders, from which only one person survives. The gang hold up the bank at Jerilderie and Kate Kelly rides to warn her brothers. Ned and his gang then kill Aaron Sheritt and there is a siege at the battle of Glenrowen Hotel in which Ned is captured and the rest of his band killed.

== Cast ==
- Godfrey Cass as Ned Kelly
- Rose Rooney as Kate Kelly
- Harry Southwell as Aaron Sherritt
- Charles Villiers as Dan Kelly
- William Ellison as Steve Hart
- Allan Douglas as Joe Byrne
- Fred Twitcham as Constable McIntyre
- Syd Everett as Sergeant Steele
- Mervyn Barrington as Sergeant Kennedy
- W Ryan as Fitzpatrick
- Don McAlpine as Scanlan
- D Sweeney as Lonergan
- Rita Aslin as Mrs Kelly
- Dunstan Webb as Superintendent Nicolson
- Beatrice Hamilton as Mrs Byrne
- David Edelsten as the judge

== Production ==
The film was shot in Sydney and on location in the Burragong Valley. Shooting was completed by late 1922.

== Reception ==
The movie was banned in October 1922 by New South Wales censors but was released in Melbourne the following year. It proved popular with audiences, despite historical errors and poor reviews.

In late 1923 it was still banned in New South Wales. There was an attempt to overturn the ban in 1925, but it was rejected.

The film was released in England in a shortened version, entitled The True Story of the Kelly Gang. Pat Hanna called it the best movie ever made in Australia.
