= Jersey Opera House =

Theatre and opera house in St Helier, Jersey

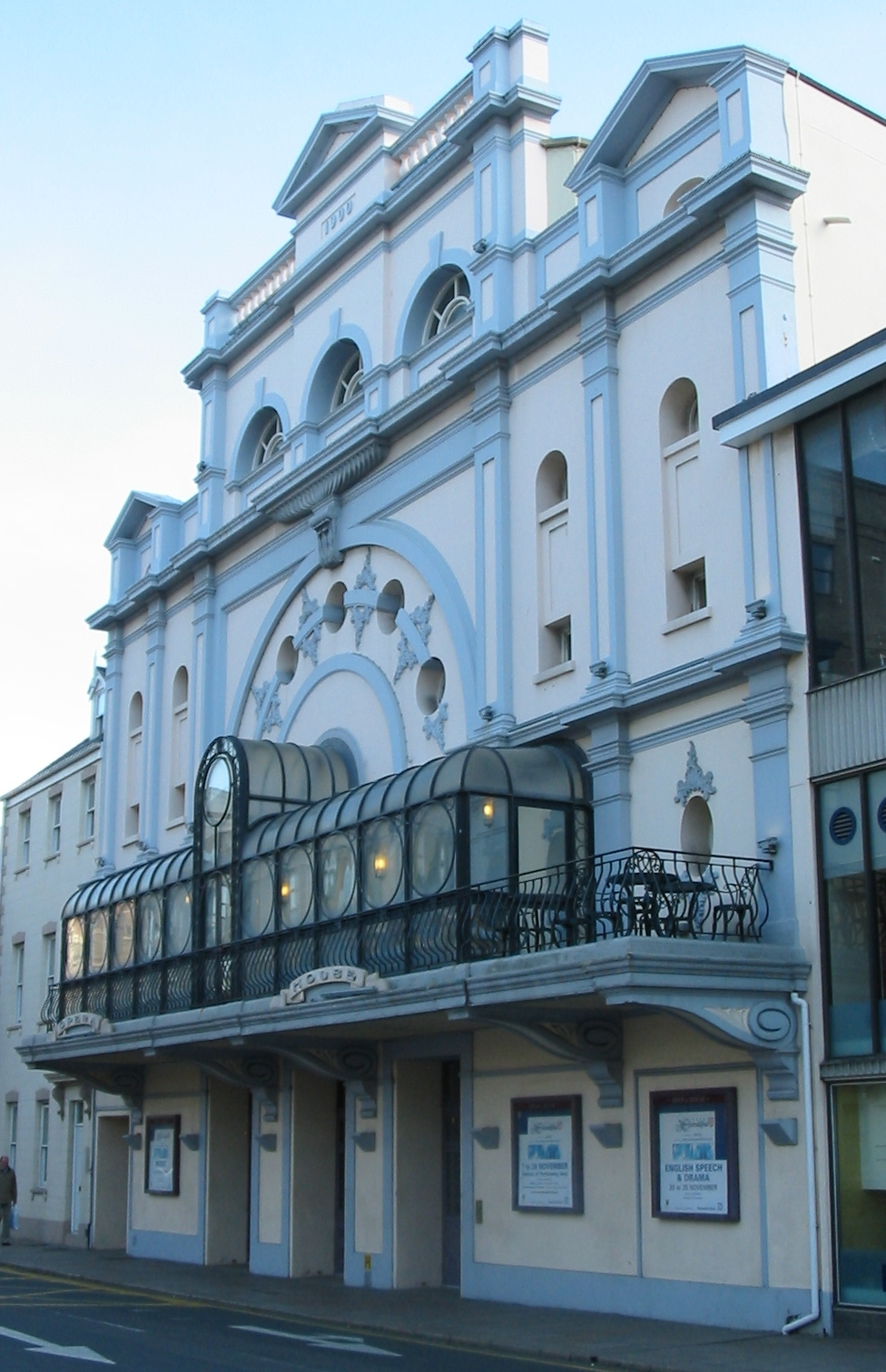
- The Opera House on Gloucester Street

- Jersey in UK
- Address: Parish of St. Helier; Channel Islands
- Coordinates: 49.186605°N 2.112857°W
- Owner: States of Jersey
- Operator: Jersey Opera House Limited
- Capacity: 625
- Type: Opera house

Construction
- Opened: 9 July 1900
- Reopened: 9 July 2000

Website
- Jersey Opera House

The Jersey Opera House is a working theatre and opera house in La Vingtaine de la Ville, Saint Helier, Jersey, Channel Islands. The theatre building is administered by the States of Jersey but is managed by Jersey Opera House Limited. The current CEO is Sebastian Warrack.

The current building is a 1922 reconstruction (by Jesty & Baker) of the 1900 original building by Adolphus Curry (1848–1910), with additional extension facilities provided since. The façade has been described as "imposing and slightly Frenchified". As part of the current refurbishment, the canopy has been removed to restore the facade to its original 1960s look.

Its chandelier has 10,200 pieces and is carefully cleaned about every five years.

== History ==
Jersey's previous main theatre, the Theatre Royal in Royal Crescent, Saint Helier, burnt down on 31 July 1863. It took two years for a new theatre to be built: Henry Cornwall opened the Royal Amphitheatre in Gloucester Street on 17 April 1865. This theatre was sold to Wybert Rousby in 1869, and became known as the Theatre Royal, and later as the Theatre Royal and Opera House.

The Theatre Royal and Opera House was described in the Royal Almanac for 1890: "Its outside appearance has nothing specially attractive, but the interior is effectively decorated and decidedly comfortable (...) Open at frequent intervals throughout the year for the production of London and Parisian successes in comedy, drama, farce; also grand and comic opera rendered by specially organized companies." In the 1880s and 1890s, prices were as follows: stalls seating for 2 shillings; dress circle seating for 3 shillings; pit seating for 1 shilling; gallery seating for 6 pence.

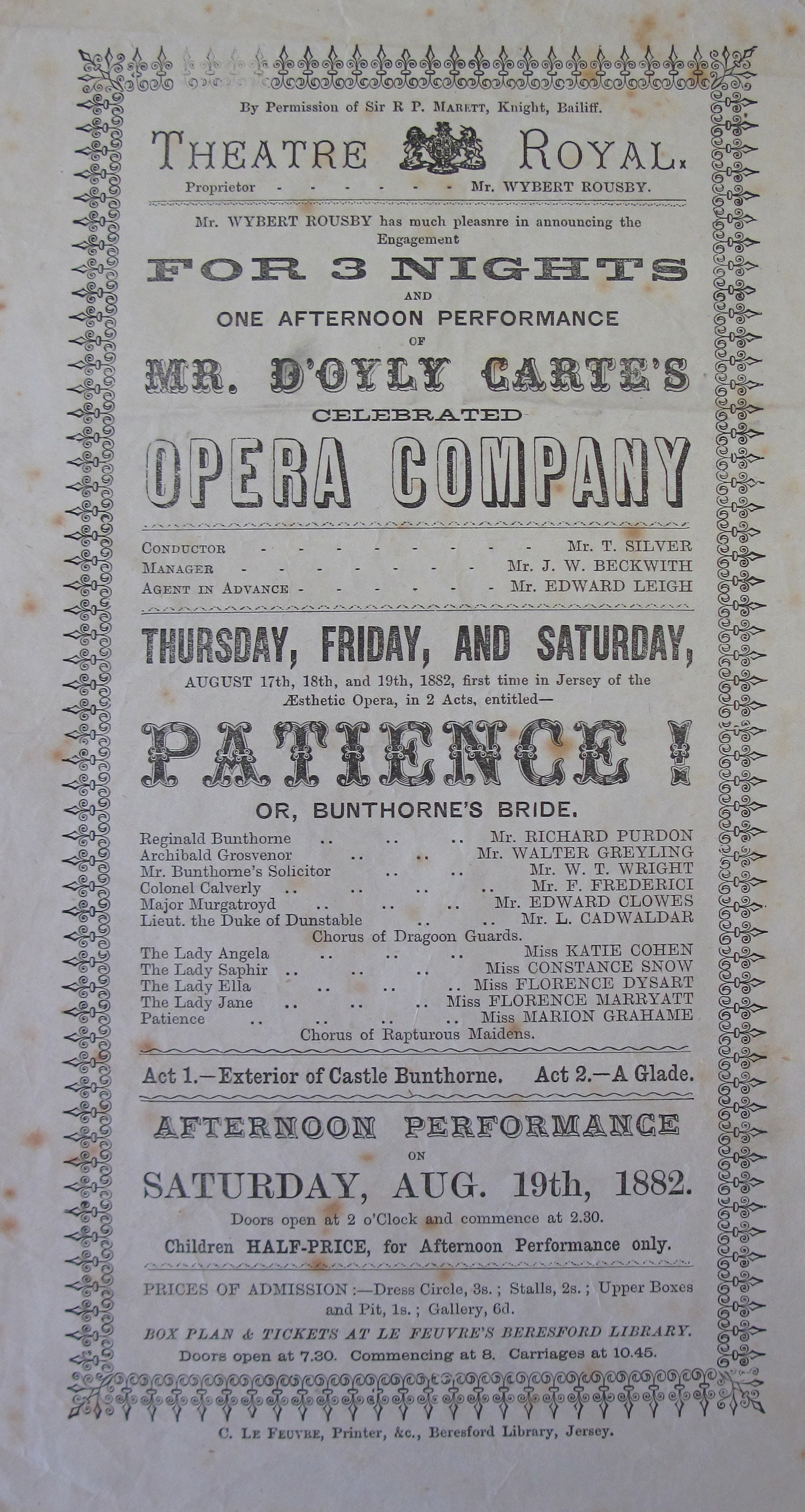
In 1882 the D'Oyly Carte Opera Company performed Patience at the Theatre Royal

The theatre hosted a number of notable events. On 29 October 1885, the unveiling of the Don Monument in The Parade was the occasion for a gala performance. In April 1891, Lillie Langtry made her first appearance in a Jersey theatre at the Theatre Royal, followed by her attendance in September 1898 of a performance of R. C. Carton's Lord and Lady Algy. A stage play, The Battle of Jersey (based on the historic events) was presented on 8 March 1899, with Wybert Rousby himself as Major Peirson, concluding with a tableau reenactment of Copley's The Death of Major Peirson on stage. The Theatre Royal hosted circus performances, for which the seats were moved from the auditorium onto the stage to permit the circus acts to perform in the body of the theatre.

Wybert Rousby sold the theatre to Sidney Cooper in 1898. Fire broke out on the night of 29 March 1899; flames were spotted at 2.30am. Police, firemen, a detachment of troops, and the actors then performing Red Riding Hood turned out to battle the fire, but at 3.10 am the roof crashed down, destroying the building. Neighbouring properties were also damaged.

The Channel Islands Entertainment Co. Ltd. built a new theatre on the ruins of the Theatre Royal and Opera House. The Opera House was opened by Lillie Langtry on 9 July 1900, who performed in the first play produced on the new premises, The Degenerates. The new building was modern and spacious compared to its predecessor. The stage was 40 feet deep and 30 feet broad with overhead room of 54 feet, capable of receiving scenery from Drury Lane, London. There were two boxes, one on each side of the stage, level with the dress circle: on the right, "The Governor's Box" and on the left, "The Bailiff's Box".

A fire on 12 May 1921 partly destroyed the building.

In the 1920s, the management started showing films at the theatre, and this developed into a programme alternating cinema and live entertainment. When the Picture House, a cinema in Saint Helier, closed in April 1931, the Opera House became a cinema. It ran a regular cinema programme until the German Occupation.

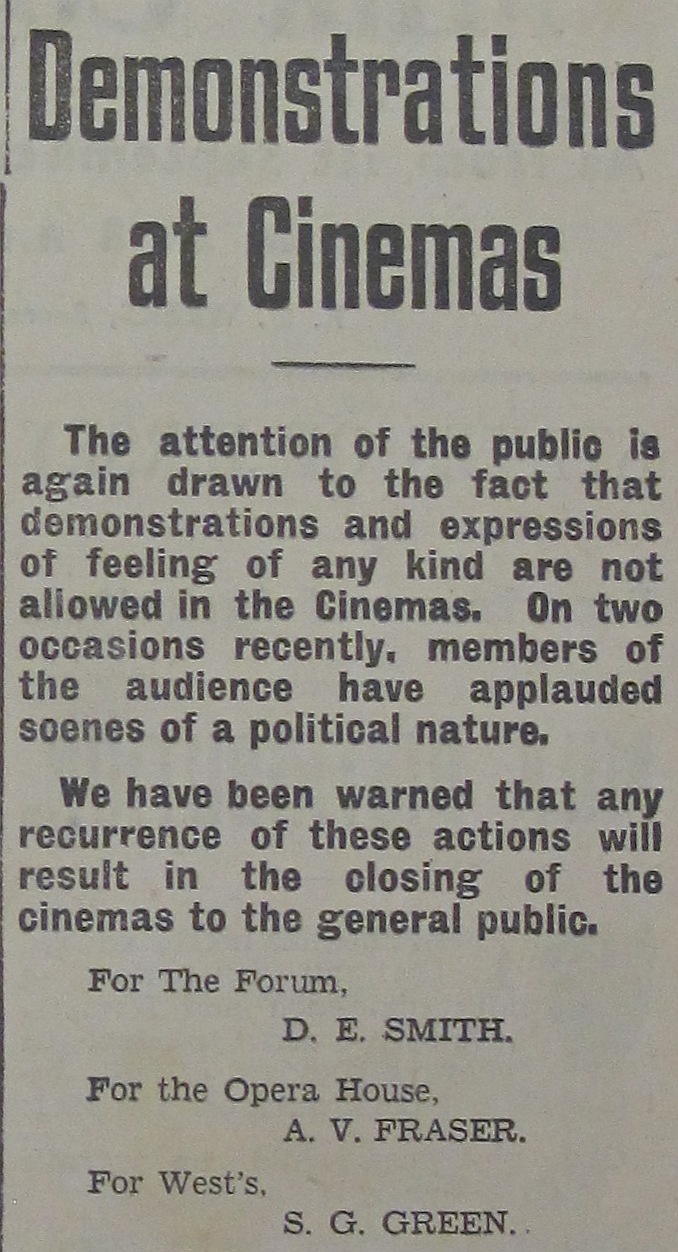
In 1941, the Opera House and other cinemas were threatened with closure by the Occupying authorities following public acts of resistance

When the Germans arrived, there were three cinemas in operation in Jersey: the Forum (opened 1935), the Opera House, and Wests (opened 1909). The Forum, as the largest cinema, was commandeered by the Germans for entertaining the troops. The two remaining cinemas had a mere 32 feature films in stock to last during the Occupation. The Opera House and Wests arranged an alternating programme between themselves, so that a week of cinema was followed by a week of stage performance and that when the Opera House was staging a play, Wests was showing a film, and vice versa.

The problem of providing entertainment and maintaining morale under the German Occupation was tackled by Jersey's amateur dramatic societies. By February 1941, a number of productions were nearing readiness but there was uncertainty as to which company would take the initiative. On 17 February, the Opera House was reopened as a theatre with a production by the Green Room Club of The Light of Heart by Emlyn Williams. After that, a new production was mounted monthly on average, interrupted by German requisitioning of the Opera House and other venues for their own purposes, such as a visit by German actress Lil Dagover. Times of curtain up varied according to the curfew imposed; on occasion when the population were collectively punished for acts of resistance by earlier curfews, the curtain had to rise as early as 6pm. The electricity supply became increasingly erratic. The Opera House was forced to resort to improvised lighting consisting of three car headlights in the orchestra pit and lights powered by car batteries in the wings.

In October 1943, a light opera, The Paladins, with libretto by Horace Wyatt and music by PG Larbalestier, was mounted. The German censor passed the text despite the inclusion of a chorus "Faithful and Free" that became an expression of patriotic longing, producing an emotional response in the audience.

In July 1943, the Opera House and other cinemas were ordered to be closed for a month, and again following D-Day on 6 June 1944 until 9 August 1944. When the electricity supply ended on 25 January 1945, performances at the Opera House ended. Immediately following Liberation on 9 May 1945, the Opera House reopened for a grand variety show on 10 May 1945 for released prisoners.

The Opera House resumed its operation as a cinema after the Liberation, but closed as a cinema in 1959, reverting to a stage theatre.

In 1953, the theatre was purchased by Odeon (Jersey) Ltd. who ran it as a cinema with the exception of the staging of a musical show, Starlight Rendezvous, in 1955 and 1956. Odeon (Jersey) Ltd. put the Opera House on the market with a condition of sale that no films were to be shown under the new ownership. Theatrical impresario Tommy Swanson negotiated with the ultimate owners Rank Organisation for eighteen months, before concluding the purchase at the end of the 1959 summer season. He undertook major renovations, adding 15 extra boxes.

The building came into the ownership of Dick Ray from 1976 to 1996. In 1995, the public of the Island of Jersey became the new owner of the Jersey Opera House at a cost of £1.3 million. In January 1997, the theatre closed for a major restoration project. A proposition was presented to the States of Jersey for a loan of £5.5 million to add to the £1.5 million that had been raised by the good will of the people and businesses of Jersey. This was successful, and this major programme of work started in August 1998. After an extensive programme of rebuilding and renovation, the new theatre opened its door on 9 July 2000, exactly 100 years to the day when the first Opera House had opened its doors to the public of Jersey, with Ian Stephens as the theatre director.

The Jersey Opera House has had some financial difficulties in the past, as well as periods when it did not operate.

The theatre had been closed since March 2020 due to the COVID-19 pandemic; however, it was discovered that there was much needed work to the structural integrity of the building that needed to be undertaken. Ashbe Construction carried out the refurbishment with the construction work completed in December 2024. The Jersey Opera House Limited company currently has a team of thirteen employees and reopened in October 2025.

== Jersey Eisteddfod ==
The opera house hosts the Jersey Eisteddfod and other events.
