= Mrs McSweeney =

- Original language: English
- Written by: Thomas Edward Spencer; Thomas Taylor
- Based on: The Surprising Adventures of Mrs Bridget McSweeney by Thomas Spencer
- Genre: comedy

Premiere
- Date: 1911
- Place: Australia

Mrs McSweeney is a 1911 Australian play by Thomas Edward Spencer and Thomas Taylor. The play had a successful run in party due to the popularity of its star Maggie Moore.

It was adapted from a 1906 book The Surprising Adventures of Mrs Bridget McSweeney by Thomas Spencer. The character of McSweeney appeared in a number of stories.

The Bulletin called it a "loose-jointed production. Each of the four acts has been built round one of Mrs. McSweeney’s “adventures,” and is quite distinct from the act next door. An unconvincing love, story is the frayed thread that holds the play together. It manages to run through the four acts, but only by stretching ’for all it is worth, and tying itself into one or two knots towards the end. Maggie Moore, who grapples with the title role, says it is one of the hardest she ever tackled. She is scarcely ever off the stage. When she is, the play really waits for her return, the other people being present only to be pelted with her stock of homely wit and wisdom."

== Premise ==
The adventures of an Irish Australian woman.
