= Albert Dorrington =

British writer

- Born: 27 September 1874; Fulham, London, England
- Died: 9 April 1953 (aged 78); Ruislip, London, England
- Occupations: novelist and journalist
- Known for: Children of the Cloven Hoof

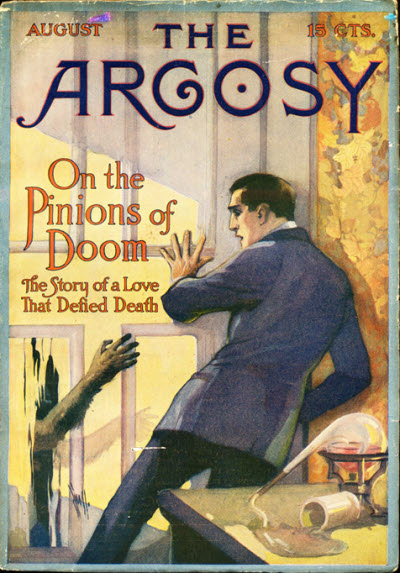
Dorrington's novella "On the Pinions of Doom" appeared in The Argosy in 1915.

Albert Dorrington (27 September 1874 – 9 April 1953) was an English writer, active in Australia, who was born in Fulham, London, England.

== Life ==
Dorrington arrived in Australia around 1890 as a sixteen-year-old and after brief stays in Melbourne and Adelaide, he traveled for many years through the back-country of New South Wales and Queensland as a newspaper and advertising canvasser. He began contributing to The Bulletin in 1895 and by 1899 had settled to live in Sydney. He took employment as a replater of silverware and lived with Leonora Anderson, who bore him several daughters.

He left Australia in 1907 complaining bitterly of the closed literary establishment there and returned to England, where he remained for the rest of his life. He died in Ruislip on 9 April 1953.

== Writing career ==
Dorrington was a frequent contributor to The Bulletin during the 1890s, under the pseudonyms "AD" and "Alba Dorian", and during his time in Australia published a book of short stories, Castro's Last Sacrament and Other Stories, and one novel, The Lady Calphurnia Royal (in collaboration with A. G. Stephens), serialized in The Bookfellow magazine, then in 1909 in book form. On his return to England he published another 13 novels and one collection of short stories. Much of his popular work contained Australian settings, with some noted as having "fantastic content", and his novels The Radium Terrors and The Half God are described as science fiction.

During his time in Australia he was a close friend of Victor Daley and Louis Becke and initially also of Stephens. However, he and Stephens had a falling out over the publication arrangements of their novel. After his return to England Dorrington was published in such magazines as Pall Mall Magazine, as well as in The Daily Telegraph and elsewhere.

Dorrington was variously described as "extravagant and tawdry" and "a writer of vigorous clear-cut stories".

== Bibliography ==
=== Novels ===
- And the Day Came: A Novel (1908)
- The Lady Calphurnia Royal with Alfred George Stephens (1909)
- Our Lady of the Leopards (1911)
- Children of the Cloven Hoof (1911)
- A South Sea Buccaneer (1911)
- The Radium Terrors (1911)
- A Door in the Desert (1927)
- The Moon-Dial (1928)
- The Fatal Call (1929)
- Madonna Island (1932)
- The Velvet Claw (1932)
- The Half God (1933)
- A Mirror in Chinatown (1933)

=== Short story collection ===
- Castro's Last Sacrament and Other Stories (1900)
- Stories to the Master (1926)
