= The Kelly Gang (film) =

1920 film

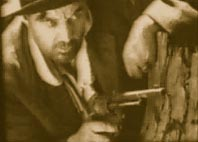
- Godfrey Cass as Ned Kelly
- Directed by: Harry Southwell
- Written by: Harry Southwell
- Produced by: Harry Southwell
- Starring: Godfrey Cass; Victor Upton-Brown; Horace Crawford
- Cinematography: Charles Herschell
- Production company: Southwell Screen Plays
- Release date: 21 February 1920
- Running time: 7,500 feet
- Country: Australia
- Languages: Silent film English intertitles
- Budget: £450
- Box office: £20,000

The Kelly Gang is an Australian feature-length film about the Australian bush ranger, Ned Kelly. The film was released in 1920, and is the second film to be based on the life of Ned Kelly, the first being The Story of the Kelly Gang, released in 1906.

== Cast ==
- Godfrey Cass as Ned Kelly
- Victor Upton-Brown as Dan Kelly
- Horace Crawford as Joe Byrne
- Jack McGowan as Steve Hart
- Robert Inman as Aaron Sherritt
- Thomas Sinclair as Sergeant Kennedy
- Harry Southwell as Sergeant Steele
- Cyril Mackay as Constable McIntyre
- Adele Inman as Kate Kelly
- Maud Appleton as Mrs Kelly
- Frank Tomlin as Constable Scanlon

Adele and Maud were daughters of actor F. C. Appleton. Robert Inman was married to Adele.

== Production ==
Filming took place in late 1919 in a temporary studio in the Melbourne suburb of Coburg with additional scenes shot on the outskirts of Melbourne at Croydon and Warburton. Cameron's store in Kilsyth was used for the bank in Euroa.

== Release ==
At the time the New South Wales government had banned films on bushranging but this movie escaped it, most likely due to its opening warning against breaking the law. The movie was reasonably successful.
