= Clara Rousby =

English stage actress (1848–1879)

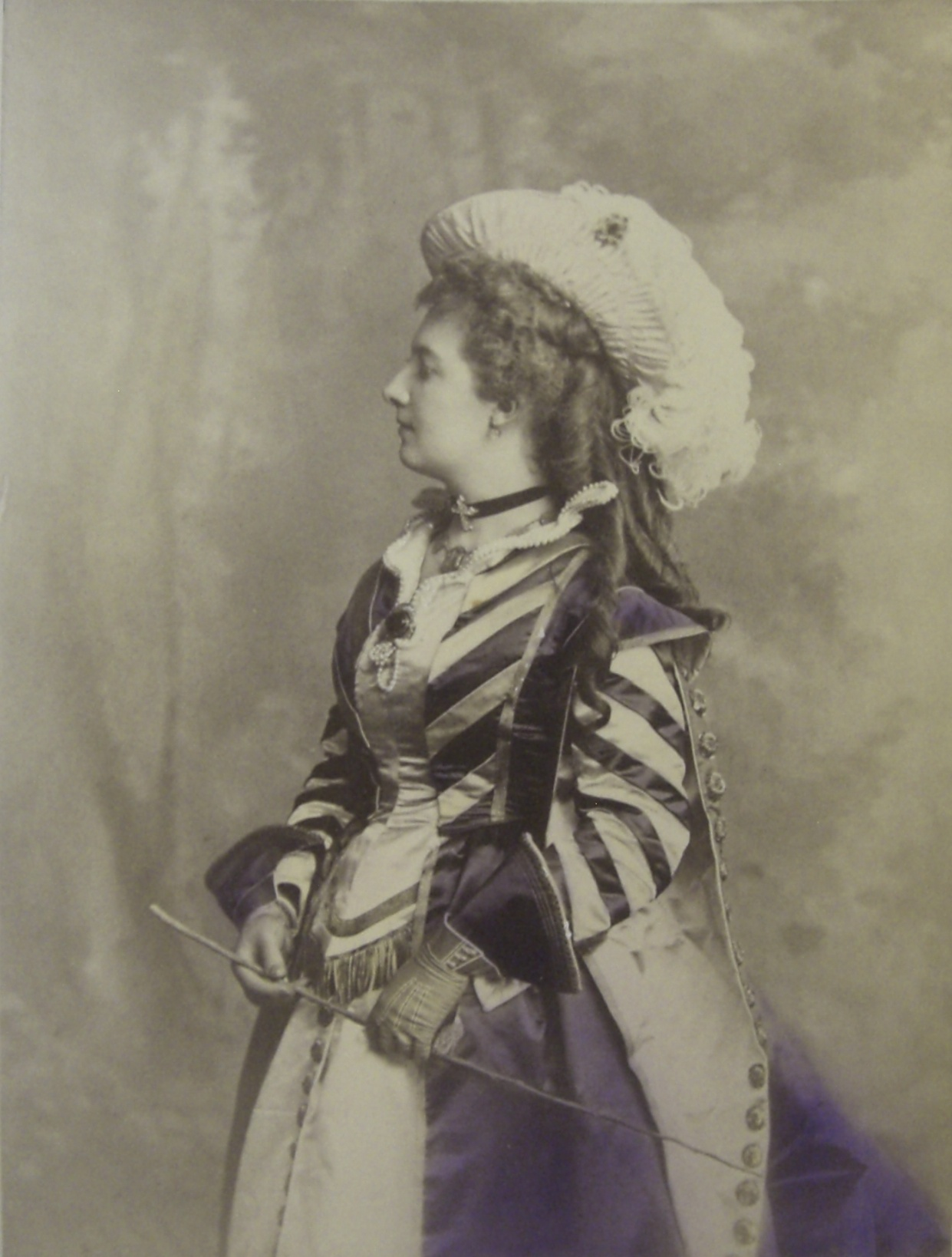
- portrait by Jose Mora
- Born: Clara Marion Jessie Dowse; 1848; Parkhurst
- Died: 19 April 1879 (aged 30–31); Wiesbaden
- Spouse: William Wybert Rousby

Clara Rousby (1848–19 April 1879) was an English actress who made notable appearances on the London stage. She was discovered by William Powell Frith who later painted her acting and exhibited the result at the Royal Academy.

== Life ==
Clara Marion Jessie Dowse was born in 1848 at the barracks at Parkhurst, Isle of Wight. She was the daughter of Sarah (born Thomas) and Dr. Richard Dowse who was the inspector-general of hospitals. She moved to Plymouth when her father retired. She met Wybert Rousby, who was an actor and theatre manager from Jersey, at the theatre. Her husband was a noted Roman Catholic convert. They married on 10 January 1868 at the Roman Catholic cathedral in Plymouth. They were acting when they were talent-spotted in Jersey by William Powell Frith and recommended to the leading London playwright Tom Taylor.

They both appeared at the Queens Theatre in Long Acre with Mrs. Rousby as Fiordelisa, and Mr. Rousby as Bertuccio in Taylor's The Fool's Revenge. Rousby was a mediocre actor but she was referred to as the "most beautiful woman on stage". In January 1870 she was appearing at the Queen's Theatre in Twixt Axe and Crown. During the run William Powell Frith painted her portrait and the painting was exhibited at the Royal Academy. In the following year Frith repeated his success by painting her as Amy Robsart in the play Kenilworth.

She then went on to play Joan of Arc where her realisation of the role was not strong and there were objections when a fire was recreated on stage.

Her last appearance was in 1878, after which she went to Germany on the advice of her doctor where she died on 19 April 1879.
