= Aaron Sherritt =

Australian criminal (1854–1880)

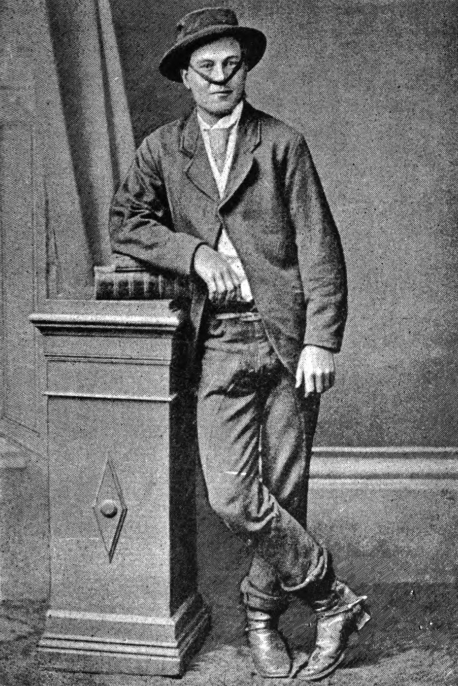
- Portrait of Sherritt wearing his hat in the "Greta mob" fashion with the chin strap resting under his nose.
- Born: Aaron Sherritt; August 1854; Prahran, Victoria, Australia
- Died: 26 June 1880 (aged 25); Woolshed district, Victoria, Australia
- Cause of death: Gunshot
- Burial place: Beechworth Cemetery
- Known for: Association with Kelly gang
- Spouse: Ellen Barry

Aaron Sherritt (August 1854 – 26 June 1880) was an associate of the gang of outlaws led by Ned Kelly in Victoria, Australia.

== Personal life ==
Aaron Sherritt was born in the Melbourne suburb of Prahran in August 1854, to Irish migrants John and Agnes Ann (née Nesbitt) Sherritt. He was the eldest of 13 children. He grew up at Woolshed near Beechworth and was a childhood friend of Kelly gang member Joe Byrne. On 26 December 1879, Sherritt married fifteen-year-old Ellen "Belle" Barry.

== Kelly Gang ==
On 26 October 1878 Ned, his brother Dan, Joe Byrne and Steve Hart were outlawed by the colony of Victoria after ambushing a party of police and murdering three policemen at Stringybark Creek. By some accounts, Sherritt offered to join the gang but was talked out of it by Ned Kelly and Joe Byrne.

He was a friend of the outlaws, but gained the trust of Police Superintendent Francis Hare. Traditional accounts of the Kelly Gang portray him as a traitor, but many of the police suspected he was a double agent working for the Kelly Gang. Detective Mick Ward actively worked to increase tensions between Sherritt and the Kelly Gang.

== Death and aftermath ==
Sherritt had made an agreement with Superintendent Francis Hare to accompany him and a party of police to observe the Byrne home in the Woolshed district. They hoped to spot the Kelly gang coming to visit and for Sherritt to obtain the reward for their capture, which now stood at eight thousand pounds. However, after weeks of watching, there was still no sign of the Kelly gang. Unfortunately for Sherritt, Joe Byrne's mother stumbled upon the police camp while gathering kindling. She now knew that he was an informer.

On 26 June 1880, Sherritt was at home with his pregnant wife, mother-in-law and four policemen, Constables Robert Alexander, Henry Armstrong, Thomas Dowling and William Duross. The police were using the Sherritt residence as a base of operations to watch the neighbours' house, belonging to the mother of Joe Byrne. A neighbour, Anton Wick, who had been handcuffed and held hostage by Joe Byrne and Dan Kelly, called out "Aaron" at the back door of Sherritt's hut. When Sherritt answered it, Byrne shot him at point-blank range in the neck and chest with a double-barrel percussion shotgun. Byrne and Kelly then held the household captive in the house for 2 hours, threatening to burn it down. They then released Anton Wick and stole back into the bush.

Aaron Sherritt's youngest brother was also named Aaron. The younger Aaron Nesbitt Sherritt was born in 1883, after the first Aaron had been shot dead.

== In popular culture ==
Sherritt appears in the 1881 play Ostracised. In the original production, staged at Melbourne's Princess Theatre, he was played by E.C. Smith.

He appears in Arnold Denham's play The Kelly Gang. In the premiere production, staged at Opera House, Sydney in 1899, he was played Walter Vincent.

In Lancelot Booth's 1899 play, Outlaw Kelly, Sherritt was played by A. S. Hodge.

The first on screen depiction of Sherritt was in the 1906 silent film The Story of the Kelly Gang where he was played by Normal Campbell.

In the 1920 silent film The Kelly Gang he was played by Robert Inman.

In the 1923 silent film When the Kellys Were Out he was played by the film's director Harry Southwell

In the 1951 film The Glenrowan Affair he was played by the film's director, writer and producer Rupert Kathner, who appeared under his pseudonym "Hunt Angels".

He appears in Douglas Stewart's verse drama Ned Kelly. In the first professional production of the play, performed in 1956, Sherritt was played by Robert Levis.

In the 1963 television play Ballad for One Gun, he was played by Neil Fitzpatrick.

In the 1970 film Ned Kelly he was played by Ken Shorter.

He appears in the rock musical in Ned Kelly: The Electric Music Show. In the original production, which premiered at the Adelaide Festival Centre in 1977, Sherritt was played by Jeremy Paul. In the 2026 revival produced by Victorian Opera, he was played by Rohan Campbell.

In the 1980 miniseries The Last Outlaw he was played by Peter Hehir.

In the 2003 film Ned Kelly he was played by Joel Edgerton.

He appears in NED – A New Australian Musical. In the original 2015 production, staged at the Ulumbarra Theatre in Bendigo, he was played by Will Rogers. In the 2018 production staged at New Theatre, Sydney, he was played by Lincoln Elliott.

== Bibliography ==
- Alec Brierley, An Illustrated History of the Kelly Gang (1979)
- Ian Jones, "The Fatal Friendship: Ned Kelly, Aaron Sherrit & Joe Byrne" (2003)
- Wedd, Monty (2013). Ned Kelly, Narrated and Illustrated by Monty Wedd. Queensland, Australia: Comicoz. ISBN 978-0-9806535-1-9.
