= Victor Upton-Brown =

Australian rules football coach

Personal information
- Full name: Victor Upton-Brown
- Born: 1 November 1880
- Died: 23 May 1964 (aged 83); The Entrance, New South Wales

Coaching career
Years	Club	Games (W–L–D)
1913	University	18 (0–18–0)

Victor Upton-Brown (1 November 1880 – 23 May 1964) was an Australian rules football coach who coached University for a season while they were competing in the Victorian Football League (VFL).

Upton-Brown coached University when Gerald Brosnan stepped aside for the 1913 season but couldn't steer the club to a single win from his 18 games in charge. When not coaching, Upton-Brown spent some time as a boundary and field umpire in the VFL. He had previously served as an umpire in the Metropolitan Junior Football Association (MJFA) during the 1907 season.

He was involved in the early Australian movie industry, writing and directing How McDougall Topped the Score based on the play How McDougall Topped the Score which was released in 1924. He is also credited as having acted in the 1920 film: The Kelly Gang, which starred Godfrey Cass.

He also taught at Wesley College in Melbourne and is credited as the lyricist of several school songs, including "Grey Towers". He was also the editor of the 1910 version of that school's songbook.

He opened the South Yarra Cinema in the suburb of South Yarra, on 22 November 1915, where he lectured on movies.

He was an occasional contributor to The Argus newspaper in Melbourne during 1914 and 1915.
