= Woman (Australian magazine) =

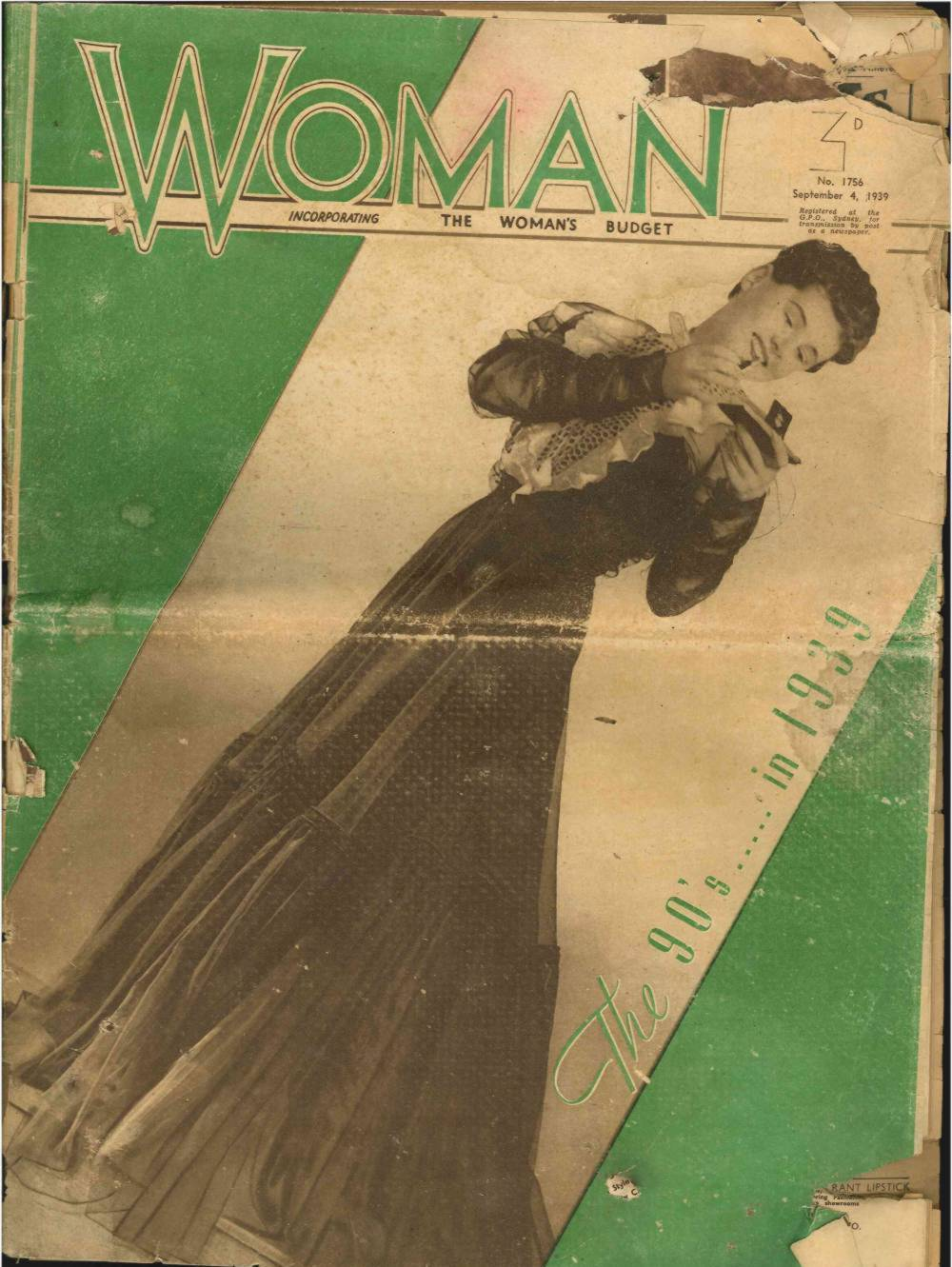
- 1939 Cover of Woman
- Categories: Home economics
- Publisher: Sungravure
- Founded: 1934
- Final issue: 1954
- Country: Australia
- Based in: Sydney
- Language: English

Woman or Woman: Incorporating the Woman's Budget was a woman's magazine published in Sydney, Australia by Sungravure. It operated from 1934 to 1954. Issues originally cost three pence each.

Fairfax, the magazine's owner, acquired Woman's Day in 1956 and merged Woman into Woman's Day.
