= Thomas Edward Spencer =

Australian poet (1845–1911)

- Born: Thomas Edward Spencer; 30 December 1845; Hoxton, London, England, United Kingdom Of Great Britain and Ireland
- Died: 6 May 1911 (aged 65); Glebe Point, New South Wales, Australia
- Resting place: Rookwood Cemetery
- Occupations: Building Contractor, Poet
- Writing career
- Pen name: Thos. E Spencer
- Language: English
- Notable work: "How M'Dougall Topped the Score"

Thomas Edward Spencer (30 December 1845 – 6 May 1911) was an Australian building contractor and writer.

== Life ==
Born at Hoxton Old Town London, his parents were Daniel O'Brien, a cabinetmaker, and Ann O'Brien. Not much is known of his early life, though it appears that Spencer's mother remarried with stonemason Thomas Edward Spencer, whose name Thomas adopted. Thomas came to Australia, visiting the Victorian goldfields in 1863 with a brother, but returned to England a year later and worked at his trade of stonemason. He dropped his father's surname by the time of his marriage to Jane Harriett Strew on 21 November 1869. Spencer was elected vice-president of the Stonemasons' Society of London, and assisted its president Henry Broadhurst in the settlement of industrial disputes.

Spencer migrated to Sydney, Australia in 1875 and became a successful builder and contractor, winning government contracts for work on Goulburn gaol, the University of Sydney's physics laboratory and the sewerage system in Sydney. Spencer's wife died in 1880, leaving a son aged 7. On 6 April 1882 at Goulburn, Spencer married Sarah Ann Christie.

During his latter years, Spencer spent much of his time as an arbitrator in industrial disputes. From 1907 to 1911 he presided over many wages boards, and his experience and sense of justice enabled him to do valuable work. Spencer died at Sydney on 6 May 1911, leaving a widow, their two sons and two daughters, along with a son from his first marriage. Spencer was buried in the Anglican section of Rookwood Cemetery.

== Writing career ==
Spencer began to contribute verse and prose sketches to The Bulletin from 1891, and one set of verses How McDougall topped the Score, included in the Bulletin Reciter, published in 1901, became very popular. A collection of his work, How McDougall Topped the Score and other Verses and Sketches, was published in 1906. This was followed by Budgeree Ballads (1908), reprinted under the title "How Doherty Died" (1910), and four volumes of prose humorous sketches, The Surprising Adventures of Mrs Bridget McSweeney (1906), A Spring Cleaning and Other Stories (1908), The Haunted Shanty and other Stories (1910), and That Droll Lady (1911). Bindawalla: An Australian Story (1912), is in a more serious vein.

== Bibliography ==
=== Novel ===
- Bindawalla: an Australian story (1912)

=== Poetry collections ===
- How McDougal Topped the Score (1906)

=== Short story collections ===
- The Surprising Adventures of Mrs. Bridget McSweeney (1906)
- A Spring Cleaning and Other Stories by Mrs. Bridget McSweeney (1908)
- The Haunted Shanty and Other Stories (1910)
- That Droll Lady : Being the Further Adventures of Mrs. Bridget McSweeney (1911)

=== Individual poems ===
- "How M'Dougal Topped the Score" (1898)

=== Plays ===
- Mrs McSweeney (1911)
