= William Wybert Rousby =

William Wybert Rousby (14 March 1835 – 10 September 1907) was an English actor, in later years a theatre proprietor and actor in Jersey.

== Life ==
Rousby was born in Hull on 14 March 1835, son of a London tradesman. He made his first appearance on the stage aged fourteen at the Queen's Theatre, Hull, as Romeo, on 16 July 1849, under the management of Mr Caple, who took a great interest in him and gave him a thorough theatrical training. Before he was sixteen Rousby appeared at Glasgow, Edinburgh, and Liverpool in such characters as Romeo, Hamlet, Othello, Macbeth, and Shylock.

=== London ===
After an engagement at Norwich he joined Samuel Phelps at Sadler's Wells Theatre, and there, as Malcolm in Macbeth, made his first appearance on the London stage on 27 August 1853. He at once achieved success, and while with Phelps he played Lucius in James Sheridan Knowles's Virginius, Laertes in Hamlet, Master Waller in Knowles's The Love Chase, Lysander in A Midsummer Night's Dream, and the Dauphin in Henry V. At the royal command performance at Windsor Castle on 10 November 1853 he played the Duke of Bedford in Henry V.

=== Jersey, the provinces, and Tom Taylor ===
Rousby was still under nineteen when he proceeded to the Theatre Royal, Jersey, to play leading parts there. He afterwards starred in the provinces, where he was likened to Edmund Kean. In 1860 he commenced a series of dramatic recitals, and he also impersonated at the principal provincial theatres leading characters in Richard III, The Man in the Iron Mask, The Lady of Lyons, Tom Taylor's Still Waters Run Deep, and Hamlet.

At the Theatre Royal, Manchester, in September 1862, he played Harry Kavanagh in Edmund Falconer's Peep o' Day, and in 1864, at the same theatre, at the Shakespearean tercentenary anniversary festival, he played Romeo in Romeo and Juliet with Henry Irving as Mercutio, Charles Calvert as Friar Laurence, and Mrs Charles Calvert as Juliet.

In 1868 he married Clara Marion Jessie Dowse. On the introduction of William Powell Frith, R.A., who had seen them act in Jersey, Tom Taylor, the dramatist, engaged them for the Queen's Theatre, Long Acre. They appeared in December 1869 in The Fool's Revenge, Taylor's adaptation of Victor Hugo's Le roi s'amuse. Rousby's performance was well received, despite a tendency to over-elaboration. In January 1870 he played Courtenay, Earl of Devon, in Tom Taylor's' Twixt Axe and Crown, in which his wife achieved a popular triumph. In February 1871 he played Orlando to his wife's Rosalind, and in April 1871 Etienne de Vignolles in Taylor's Joan of Arc.

At Drury Lane, under Falconer and F. B. Chatterton's management, he acted King Lear to his wife's Cordelia in March 1873. At the Princess's Theatre, under Chatterton's management, he was Cosmo in Mary Elizabeth Braddon's Griselda in November 1873, and John Knox in W. G. Wills's Mary Queen of Scots in February 1874.

=== Last years in Jersey ===
After the death of his wife in 1879 Rousby became proprietor and manager of the Theatre Royal, Jersey, where he reappeared from time to time in his old parts in such plays as Jane Shore, Trapped, and Ingomar. He was also manager of St Julian's Hall, Guernsey, and to the end of his life gave dramatic recitals in the island.

Finally retiring from the stage in 1898, he died in Guernsey on 10 September 1907, and was buried at the Mont-à-l'Abbé Cemetery, Jersey. His second wife, Alice Emma Maud Morris, whom he married on 5 July 1880, survived him without issue.

== Description ==
His biographer in the Dictionary of National Biography wrote: "In his prime Rousby was a conscientious actor, with a good voice and a mastery of correct emphasis, but he gave an impression of stiffness and self-consciousness, which grew on him and prevented him from rising high in his profession."

== See also ==
- Theatre of Jersey
