= Thomas Curnow =

Australian schoolteacher (1855–1922)

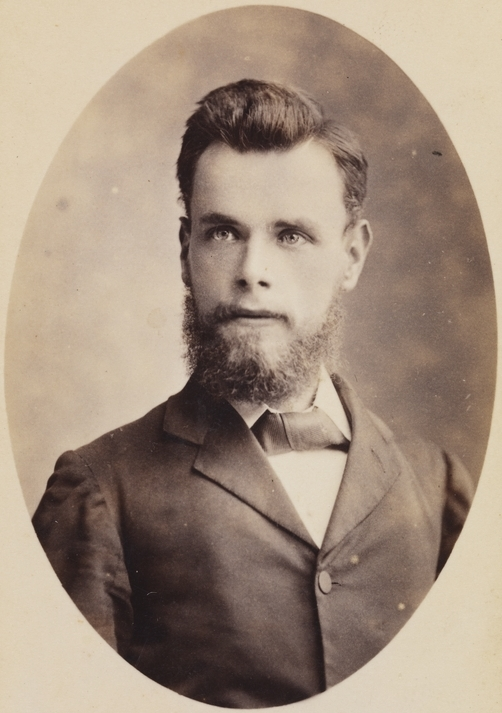
- Curnow, 1880
- Born: 4 June 1855; Trevarth, Gwennap, Cornwall, England
- Died: 20 December 1922 (aged 67); Ballarat, Victoria, Australia
- Occupation: Schoolteacher
- Known for: Role in the downfall of Ned Kelly

Thomas Curnow (4 June 1855 – 20 December 1922) was an English-born Australian schoolteacher who helped prevent the derailment of a police train by the Kelly gang, led by bushranger and outlaw Ned Kelly. Curnow's actions are credited with saving the lives of 27 passengers, including civilians.

Raised in Ballarat, Victoria, Curnow taught at the state school in Glenrowan, a small town north-east of Melbourne. In 1880, the Kelly gang took over the town and held many of its residents hostage, including Curnow and his wife. The outlaws had nearby railway tracks torn up in order to derail and ambush a police special train. After learning of the plot, Curnow aimed to thwart it by pretending to be a sympathiser of the gang. Having won Kelly's confidence, the outlaw allowed him and his wife to return home. Curnow then headed to the railway line and, as the train approached, he improvised a warning signal using a lit candle behind a red scarf. This successfully flagged down the pilot engine, which had been sent in advance of the police special as a lookout. After telling the driver of the Kellys and sabotaged track, Curnow returned home while the police proceeded to Glenrowan. In the resulting siege and shootout, Kelly was captured and the other three gang members (Joe Byrne, Steve Hart and Dan Kelly) were killed.

Due to his role in the gang's demise, Curnow received death threats from Kelly sympathisers, and the Victorian government subsequently relocated him and his family to Ballarat, where he spent the rest of his life. Among the claimants for the £8,000 bounty on the gang's heads, Curnow received the largest portion with £1,000, and was awarded the Victorian Humane Society's annual medal for bravery. Today, Curnow is a relatively obscure figure in Australian history, overshadowed by the widespread fame of the Kelly gang.

== Family and early life ==
Curnow was born on 4 June 1855 at Gwennap, Cornwall, to Thomas, who worked as a copper miner, and Ann (née Trewartha). His parents married in April 1852 and would eventually have seven children, Thomas being the second eldest. The Curnows resided at the small village of Trevarth, outside Gwennap.

Curnow was born with a congenital hip deformity. It left him with a permanent limp, and he was described as physically slight and weak.

The Curnows migrated to the Colony of Victoria, Australia, by 1857, settling in Ballarat. In the 1870s, Thomas Curnow studied to be a teacher, and in July 1876 he was appointed the head teacher at the state school in Glenrowan, a small country town 220 km (140 mi) north-east of Melbourne. Classes were initially conducted in a storeroom at the post office, with an average attendance of 28 pupils.

On 1 July 1878, Curnow married Jane Isabella Mortimer. Aged 19 at the time, she was born in Wangaratta and lived in Glenrowan with her mother. Thomas and Jane Curnow's first child, Muriel Maud Jean Curnow, was born in Benalla on 27 July 1879.

== Kelly gang and Glenrowan siege ==
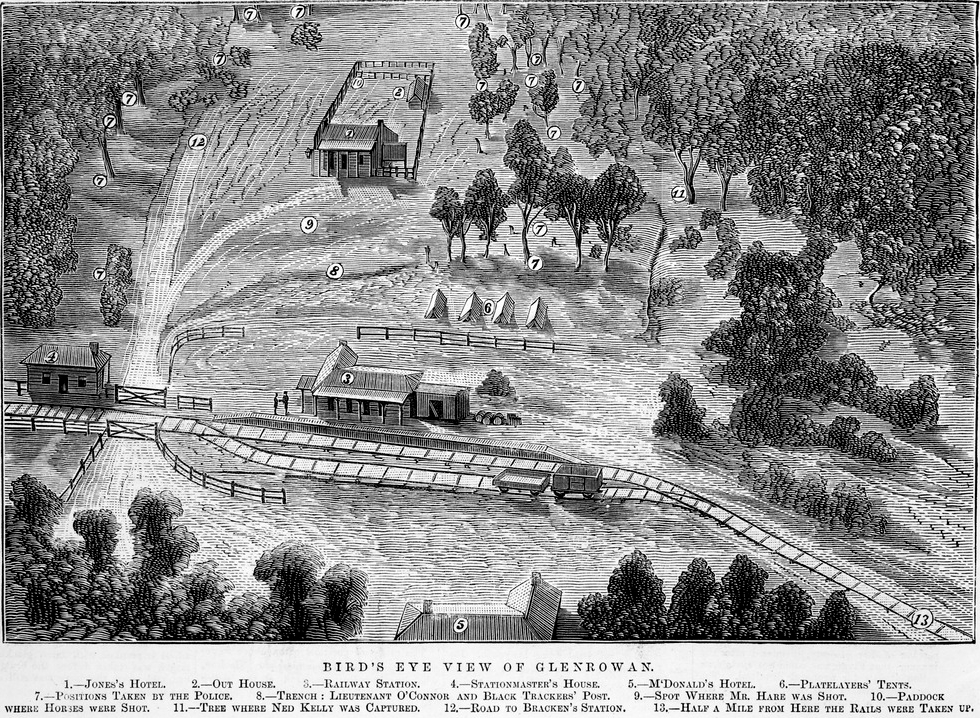
Bird's eye view of Glenrowan

At around 11 am on 27 June 1880, Curnow was driving his buggy through Glenrowan, accompanied by his pregnant wife and baby daughter, his sister Catherine and his brother-in-law David Mortimer. While passing Ann Jones' Glenrowan Inn, they were held up by bushranger and outlaw Ned Kelly. "I am sorry," he told them, "but I must detain you." Kelly and his gang had been outlawed in 1878 for murdering three policemen, and were also wanted for raiding towns and robbing banks in Victoria and New South Wales. The night prior to holding up the Curnows, gang member Joe Byrne murdered police informer Aaron Sherritt, near Beechworth. The gang subsequently converged on Glenrowan and, by evening, had taken some sixty-two people hostage, with men held in the Glenrowan Inn and women and children in the nearby home of stationmaster John Stanistreet.

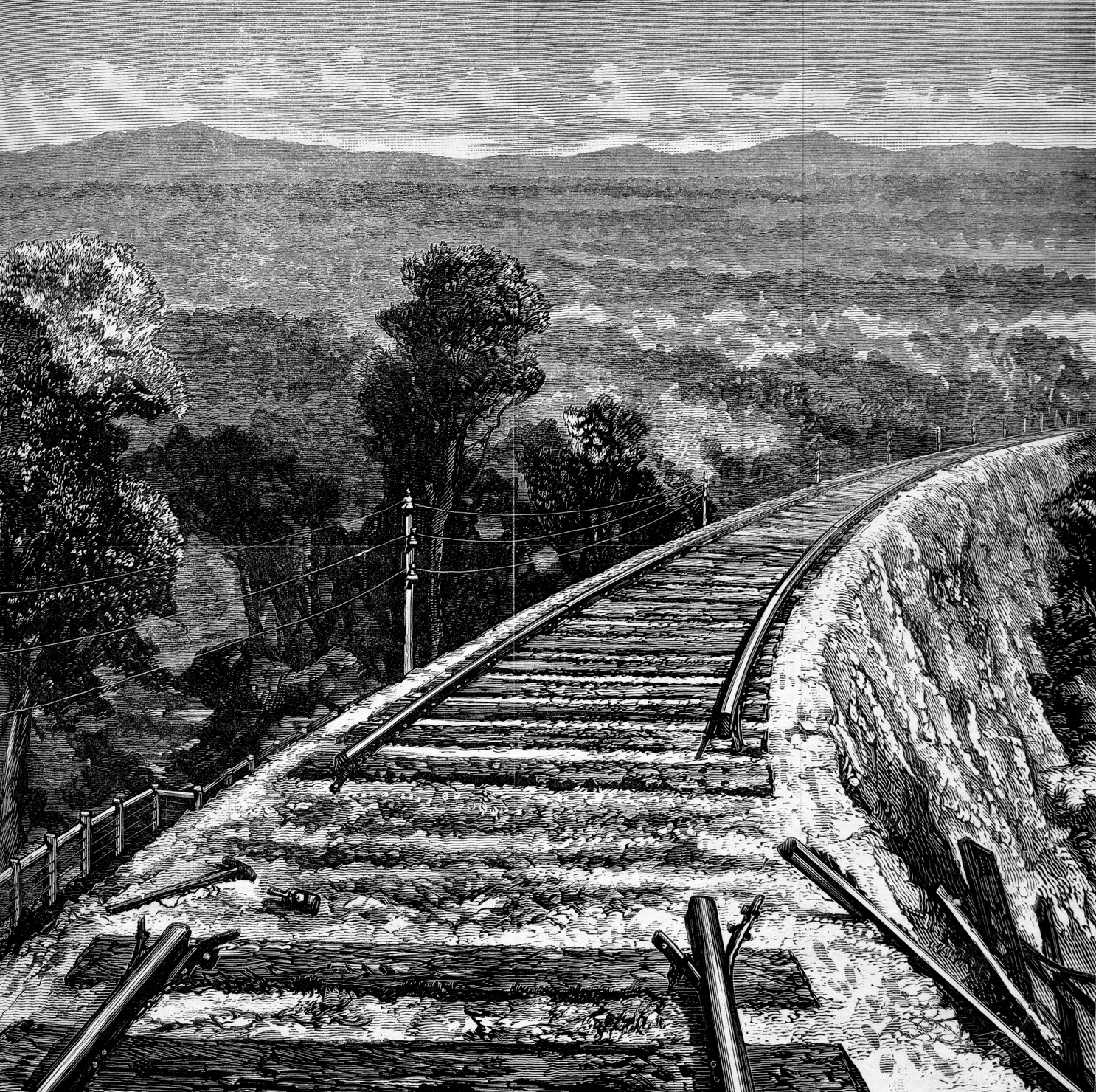
The section of sabotaged track

Curnow obeyed Kelly's orders and went with his family into the home, where he learned from other hostages that the gang had forced local railway workers to sabotage the track north of the Glenrowan railway station. Curnow then went to the Glenrowan Inn, where gang member Dan Kelly invited him to drink at the bar. Dan and Byrne told Curnow that a special police train was on its way to Beechworth to pick up the gang's trail after word of Sherritt's murder got out. The outlaws sabotaged a section of the track that ran at an incline, where the train would be travelling at 100 km/h (60 mph) before falling down a steep embankment. "[We are] going to send the train and its occupants to hell", they told Curnow. He recalled:

They stated they would shoot down all those who escaped death from the wrecked train, and that if any civilians were in the train, they should share the same fate as they had no business accompanying the Police. On hearing their intentions I determined that if I could by any means whatever baulk their designs and prevent such a sacrifice of human life, I would do so.

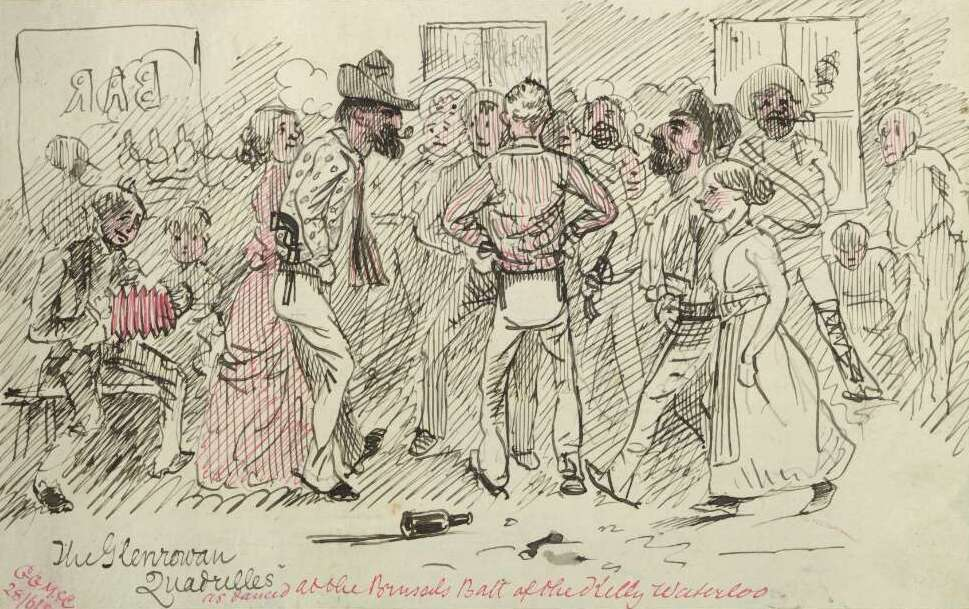
Hostages dancing with the outlaws. Curnow danced with Dan Kelly.

Curnow also learned that, after derailing and ambushing the train, the gang planned to raid Benalla. While scheming of ways to thwart their plans, Curnow resolved to pretend to be a sympathiser of the gang, to gain their trust. As the hours passed without sight of the train, the outlaws staged sporting games and held dances to keep the hostages entertained. Upon Kelly's request, Curnow's brother-in-law Mortimer supplied music on a concertina. When Dan invited Curnow to dance, the schoolteacher said he needed to go home first and fetch his dancing shoes, and asked Ned to accompany him. On the way, they would have to pass the police barracks, Curnow hoping that the town policeman, Constable Hugh Bracken, would see Ned and raise the alarm. Ned knew of Bracken's presence however, and refused Curnow's request, so he made do with his nail boots.

Over the next several hours, Curnow seized opportunities to ingratiate himself with the gang. First he arranged for Steve Hart's sore feet to be soaked in warm water, then helped Dan search for a missing parcel, as he "seemed very anxious about it". Later, Curnow informed Ned that Stanistreet kept a revolver at his home: "I told the gang ... that though I knew he would not use it against them, some one else might". Ned thanked Curnow and confiscated the gun.

At 2:30 pm, word of Sherritt's murder finally reached Superintendent Francis Augustus Hare, who led the hunt for the Kelly gang out of Benalla. Two hours later, Hare was able to alert Frederick Standish, the Chief Commissioner of Police. Several more hours passed as Standish arranged a special train in Melbourne. It finally left Spencer Street station for Beechworth at 10 pm, taking on board four journalists and Sub-Inspector O'Connor with his wife, sister-in-law and five Aboriginal trackers. Stopping at Benalla a little after midnight, they were joined by Hare and eight troopers, bringing the total number of passengers to 27. Hare ordered a pilot engine to travel ahead of the police special as a lookout.

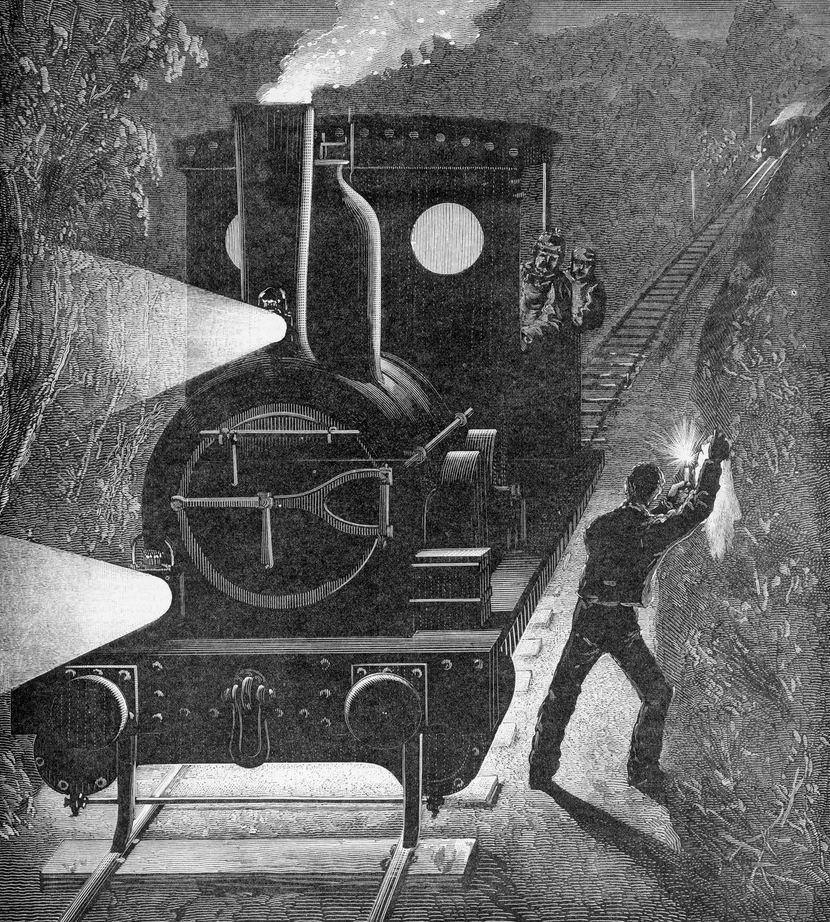
Curnow flagging down the pilot engine. The police special train can be seen in the distance.

Meanwhile, Ned and Byrne had taken Curnow and a few other hostages to the police barracks to capture Constable Bracken. Curnow convinced Ned to use Mortimer to lure Bracken out, "as the trooper knew his voice well, and would suspect nothing". After Bracken's capture, Ned allowed Curnow to return home with his family, saying that he could see the schoolteacher was with him "heart and soul". Ned however, advised him "not to dream too loud" when he went to bed, and said an outlaw would check in on them later that night, intimating that they would be shot if there was any sign that they had betrayed the gang.

Once home, Curnow collected matches and a candle, and borrowed his sister's red scarf. Curnow had been struck by the sight of the scarf while imprisoned at Stanistreet's, and thought it would make a "splendid danger signal". He intended on riding along the railway line to Benalla, hoping to raise the alarm there before the train left. His wife Jane begged him not to go for fear that they would all be killed by the outlaws. To protect them while he completed his mission, Curnow took his family to his mother-in-law's nearby farm, but Jane insisted on returning home. There, Curnow lied and said he had abandoned his plan. Satisfied, Jane went to bed, allowing Curnow to leave for the railway line at 2:30 am. As he did so, he heard the approach of what turned out to be the pilot engine. Curnow reached the line in time and held up the lighted candle behind the scarf. The guard stopped the pilot after noticing a "tiny red glow in the darkness". Curnow called out, "It's the Kellys!", and said the track had been sabotaged beyond Glenrowan station. He quickly returned home, fearing that at any moment he would be shot by the outlaws or their spies.

The special stopped behind the pilot engine, whose driver apprised the police of the situation. The locomotives then joined and crawled along the line to Glenrowan station. The outlaws heard the train arrive and saw the police disembark and unload their horses. One hostage heard Kelly say, "By God, that bastard Curnow has deceived us." A 12-hour siege unfolded, during which the gang, clad in armour, engaged the police in a shootout. By the afternoon of 28 June, several hostages had been fatally shot, Kelly had been wounded and captured, and the other three gang members were dead.

=== Aftermath ===
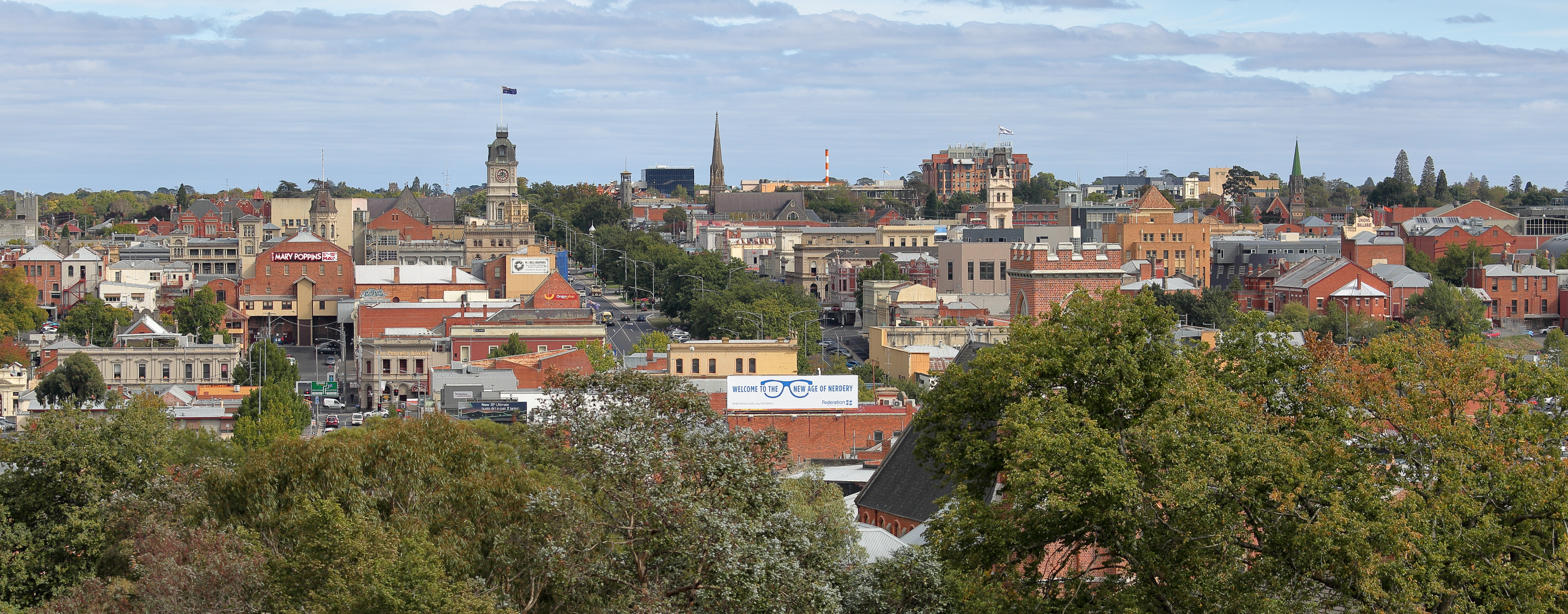
Following the Glenrowan affair, Curnow moved permanently to Ballarat to avoid Kelly sympathisers.

In the days following the Glenrowan siege, Curnow was granted indefinite leave from his teaching position in Glenrowan, and the authorities had him and his family relocated to Benalla, then to Melbourne, "lest the friends of the outlaws should attempt to avenge their death". The Minister of Education, Robert Ramsay, praised Curnow's actions as highly meritorious, emphasising that had he not flagged down the train, many lives would have been lost. By early July, Curnow had relocated to his hometown of Ballarat, where he was invited to appear on the balcony of the Mechanics' Institute; surrounding businesses temporarily closed and some 400 to 500 people gathered in the street to applaud him.

That same month, a Kelly Reward Board was established to assess claims for the £8,000 reward for the gang's capture. It was largely distributed among the police involved in the hunt for the gang and in the Glenrowan shootout. Superintendent Hare, who left the gun battle early due to a bullet wound, received the largest portion with £800. Curnow initially received £550 but appealed for more, pointing out that his family had suffered financially from the forced relocation and that £550 barely covered his losses, including the pay cut he had taken teaching at a new school in Ballarat. The colonial press supported Curnow's protest, and according to The Argus, "ninety-nine men out of a hundred will, we are sure, agree that the substantial donation should be awarded to the schoolmaster instead of the police officer." Premier Graham Berry was also highly critical of the distribution of the funds, saying during a speech in Geelong that "Curnow ought to have received the whole of the money". Curnow eventually received an additional £450 and a mantle clock, making him the recipient of the largest award.

On 22 July 1881, the Victorian Humane Society awarded Curnow its silver medal, then the society's highest honour and given annually for acts of great courage. In presenting the medal to Curnow at the Melbourne Town Hall, the governor of Victoria, George Phipps, 2nd Marquess of Normanby, said "owing to your courage and presence of mind, not only that the special train which contained the police was saved from being wrecked as the outlaws intended, but also that those outlaws were brought to justice."

Despite having left "Kelly Country", Curnow continued to receive death threats, and he told one reporter in 1881 that even in Ballarat, he and his wife "[lived] in a state of constant watchfulness and expectation of something injurious being done to us." One relative recalled Curnow being threatened as he walked through a Ballarat park, but he pretended not to hear. Owing to such incidents, he was reportedly granted a permit to carry firearms. False reports were also circulated that Curnow was living under an assumed name in Gippsland, possibly as a smokescreen.

== Later life ==
After the birth of Muriel (1879–1952), Curnow and Jean had three more children: Isobel (1881–1934), Thomas (1883–1918) and Leonard (1887–1958). The couple also gave birth to stillborn twins in 1886.

While teaching in Ballarat, Curnow maintained a long-standing association with the Ballarat City Fire Brigade, serving as either secretary or treasurer over many years. He was also elected secretary of the Victorian Country Fire Brigades Association in 1886. A Freemason, Curnow held the position of Worshipful Master of St John's Lodge, Ballarat, in 1887. One visitor to the lodge, the "Vagabond" (Julian Thomas), found Curnow to be an unassuming yet quietly dignified man who evinced a "true moral power which, in moments of real danger, is so superior to mere brute force".

Curnow rarely talked about the Glenrowan affair, and out of respect, those close to him seldom mentioned or alluded to it. Even so, he was said to have no regrets. One journalist who met Curnow in old age wrote:

And so, in the placid serenity of his autumn of life, Mr Curnow goes on with the work that he has always followed; the instruction of the young. And a wise and capable instructor he has proved himself.

Curnow retired from teaching on 30 June 1915. His retirement received press coverage throughout Australia. Three of his four children served in World War I; Thomas was killed in action in 1918, while Leonard was wounded after surviving the torpedoing of his troopship in 1917. He was later committed to the Ballarat Mental Asylum, possibly due to shell shock. Isobel served as an army nurse.

Curnow died on 20 December 1922, and was buried the following day in a private funeral at Ballaarat Old Cemetery, near his parents. The alias 'Ginge' Curnow was etched on his tombstone, a measure taken to protect his grave from desecration.

== Legacy ==
Although Curnow became well known in Australia following the Glenrowan siege, today he is a relatively obscure figure in Australian history. According to academic and whistleblower advocate Kim Sawyer, "Curnow was not discriminated against in his employment or by the government; but he has been discriminated against in our collective memory." He argues that Curnow's obscurity is a result of a tendency in Australian history to "invert the truth":

Villains become heroes because of who they were not; and heroes become the unknowns they should not be. Such is the case of Ned Kelly and Thomas Curnow. ... While Kelly is known to everyone, Curnow is unknown to nearly everyone. It is one of our great inversions.

In most plays and films about the Kelly gang, Curnow is a minor character—often depicted, according to Geoffrey Robertson, as "an ugly, elderly pedant, a caricature dobber-inner". Reviewing a 1956 performance of Douglas Stewart's play Ned Kelly (1942), The Bulletin wrote that actor Frank Lloyd's Curnow "is a good version of the character as conceived—a sly and wily little schoolteacher who brings Ned down ... sufficiently unimpressive for Ned to let him leave the hotel without worrying about the consequences." In Peter Carey's Booker Prize–winning novel True History of the Kelly Gang (2000), Curnow is elevated as an important character who encourages Kelly to write the autobiography that becomes the bulk of the text. After betraying Kelly to the police, and during the outlaw's last stand and capture at Glenrowan, Curnow takes possession of Kelly's manuscript. At the end of the novel, a third-person narrative, signed "S.C." and dating from the year after Curnow's death, describes both the schoolteacher's public outrage at Kelly's celebrity, and his private, lifelong obsession with the manuscript, which, according to S.C., "seems to have made its own private demands upon his sympathy".

Efforts have been made to bring Curnow greater public recognition and highlight his heroism. The Argus ran a comic in 1947 titled The School Teacher Who Did Not Fear Ned Kelly. In a 1949 article attacking Ned Kelly hagiography, Sydney journalist James Taylor wrote that Curnow "was, as far as I have been able to discover, the only man to show the slightest initiative during the whole costly chase". In 1973, when a plaque was unveiled marking the spot where Kelly had the railway tracks torn up, journalist Keith Dunstan argued: "Actually, Curnow, the schoolteacher who risked death to warn the train, is the man who deserved a mention in bronze." When invited to contribute an essay to a book on Australian Greats, Geoffrey Robertson submitted "As Game as Tom Curnow", the title referencing and challenging the Australian expression for bravery, "as game as Ned Kelly". In 2016, playwright and screenwriter Kenneth G. Ross said he was writing a novel about Curnow.

The red scarf used by Curnow to flag down the train was cut up and distributed among relatives. These fragments have ended up in various public and private collections, and have also appeared at auction. Fragments are held at the State Library of New South Wales, Sydney, and the Victorian branch of the National Trust. Another featured in a 2024 episode of the British television series Antiques Roadshow.

== See also ==
- Matthew Gibney, a Catholic priest who won praise for his heroism at the Glenrowan siege

== Bibliography ==
- Boldrini, Lucia (2012). Autobiographies of Others: Historical Subjects and Literary Fiction. Taylor & Francis. ISBN 9781136283253.
- Castles, Alex C. (2005). Ned Kelly's Last Days: Setting the Record Straight on the Death of an Outlaw. Allen & Unwin. ISBN 9781741159141.
- Hare, Francis Augustus (1892). The Last of the Bushrangers: An Account of the Capture of the Kelly Gang. Hurst and Blackett.
- Holmes, Chris (2011). "What the World Leaves Behind: Ready-Made Translations and the "Closed Book" in the Postcolonial Novel". In McDermott, Alex (ed.). Literature, Geography, Translation: Studies in World Writing. Cambridge Scholars. ISBN 9781443831345.
- Innes, Lyn (2008). Ned Kelly: Icon of Modern Culture. Helm Information Ltd. ISBN 978-1-903206-16-4.
- Johnson, Frances A. (2015). Australian Fiction as Archival Salvage: Making and Unmaking the Postcolonial Novel. Brill. ISBN 9789004311671.
- McMenomy, Keith (1984). Ned Kelly: The Authentic Illustrated History. C. O. Ross. ISBN 978-0-85902-122-7.
- Molony, John (2001). Ned Kelly. Melbourne University Publishing. ISBN 978-0-522-85013-0.
- Robertson, Geoffrey (2013). Dreaming Too Loud. Random House Australia. ISBN 9780857981905.
- Shaw, Ian W. (2012). Glenrowan. Hyland House Pub. ISBN 978-1-86447-047-5.
- Terry, Paul (2012). The True Story of Ned Kelly's Last Stand. Allen & Unwin. ISBN 9781743310069.
