= Cultural depictions of Ned Kelly =

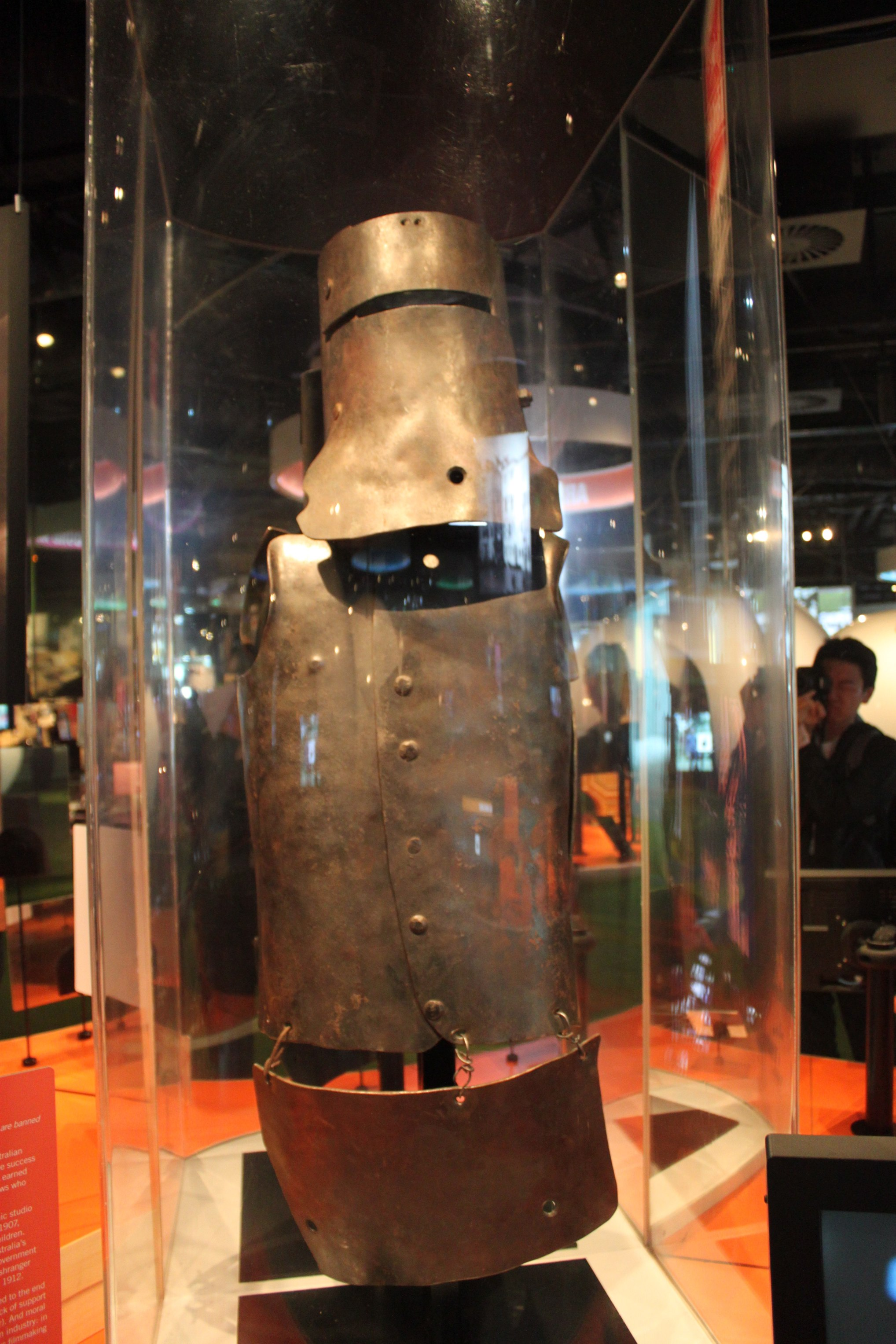
A replica of Ned Kelly's armour, designed for the 2003 film Ned Kelly starring Heath Ledger in the title role and now in the collection of the Australian Centre for the Moving Image

Ned Kelly was a 19th-century Australian bushranger and outlaw whose life has inspired numerous works in the arts and popular culture, especially in his home country, where he is viewed by some as a Robin Hood-like figure.

== Theatre ==
A melodrama, The Kelly Gang, by Arnold Denham, was popular in Australia in the late 1890s. Other plays inspired by the story include:

- Ned Kelly by Douglas Stewart (first produced for radio in 1942, and on stage from the mid-1940s)
- Kelly by Matthew Ryan
- Catching the Kellys by J. Pickersgill (1879)
- Ostracized by E.C. Martin (1881)
- The Kelly Gang by Dan Berry
- Outlaw Kelly by Lancelot Booth (1899)
- Ned Kelly by Harry Leader and Bernard Espinasse
- Ned Kelly by James Clancy. Joan Littlewood production, Stratford East, London, May 1960.

Ned Kelly, a large-scale musical by Reg Livermore and Patrick Flynn, played in Adelaide and Sydney in 1977 and 1978.

In 2012, Matthew Ryan's stage play Kelly premiered at Queensland Theatre Company, focusing on Ned Kelly's last night alive. It toured Australia nationally in 2015 and was nominated for a Helpmann Award for Best Regional Touring Production.

In 2015, another musical treatment of the Kelly story premiered at the Ulumbarra Theatre in the Victorian town of Bendigo. Ned: A New Australian Musical (or sometimes shortened to Ned: The Musical), featured a book by Anna Lyon and Marc Mcintyre, and music and lyrics by Adam Lyon. The production ran from 22 May to 31 May. A concert version was staged at Melbourne's National Theatre on the 17 July 2017.

== Literature ==
A. Bertram Chandler's novel Kelly Country (1983) is an alternate history in which Kelly leads a successful revolution. The result is that Australia becomes a world power, but the Australian Republic which Kelly founded degenerates into a hereditary dictatorship.

Our Sunshine (1991) by Robert Drewe was the basis of the 2003 film, Ned Kelly, that starred Heath Ledger.

Peter Carey's novel True History of the Kelly Gang was published in 2000, and was awarded the 2001 Booker Prize and the Commonwealth Writers Prize.

Terry Pratchett's novel The Last Continent has a character called "Tinhead Ned", who is loosely based on Kelly.

== Bush poetry and verse ==
Many poems and ditties emerged during the Kelly era (1878–80) relating their exploits. Some were later put to music.

Stringybark Creek (below) was often sung, to the tune of "The Wearing of the Green", during the Outbreak. Offenders caught chanting or singing this piece were fined £2 or £5, in default one or two months.

Stringybark Creek

A sergeant and three constables
Set out from Mansfield town
Near the end of last October
For to hunt the Kellys down;
So they travelled to the Wombat [Hills],
And thought it quite a lark,
And they camped upon the borders of
A creek called Stringybark.

They had grub and ammunition there
To last them many a week.
Next morning two of them rode out,
All to explore the creek.
Leaving McIntyre behind them at
The camp to cook the grub,
And Lonigan to sweep the floor
And boss the washing tub.

== Ned Kelly at war ==
- In early June 1900, when the Boer Transvaal capital Pretoria fell to the British assault, President Paul Kruger and his government fled east on a train and evaded capture. In the Melbourne Punch of 21 June 1900, a cartoon titled "BAIL-UP!" depicted the Kelly Gang capturing Kruger's train and seizing Kruger's gold, thus winning the Boer War for the British. This is among the first of the Australian political cartoons to invoke Kelly's memory.
- During the tough days during World War I cartoons in the Queensland Worker, later re-printed in Labor Call, 16 September 1915, showed profiteers robbing Australian citizens, while Ned Kelly in armour watched on saying; "Well Well! I never got as low as that, and they hung me."
- During World War II, Clive Turnbull published Ned Kelly: Being His Own Story of His Life and Crimes. In the introduction Turnbull invoked the Kelly historical memory to urge Australians to adopt the Kelly spirit and resist the oppression of the potential invader.

== Ned Kelly in iconography ==
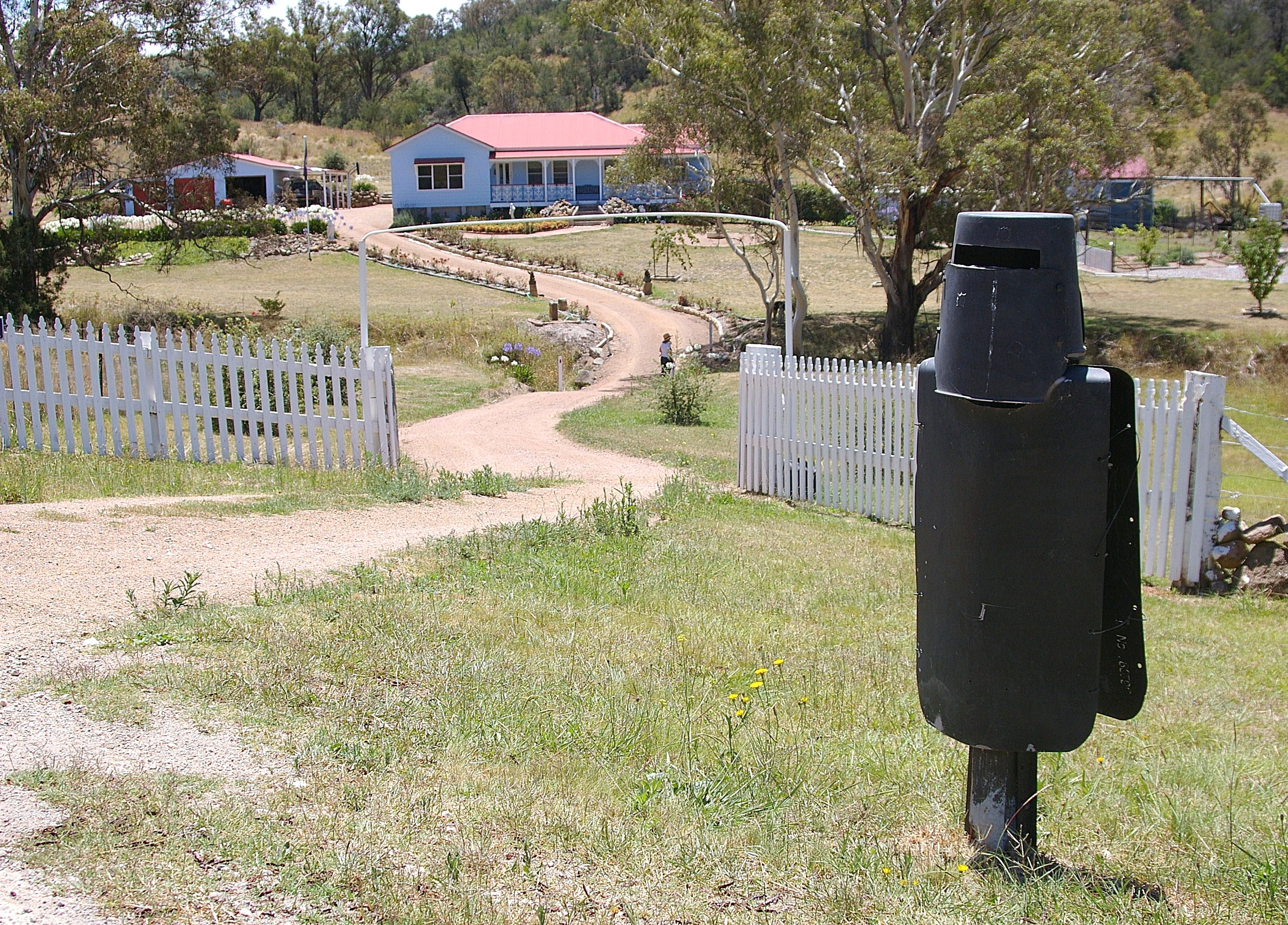
A homemade letterbox in the style of Ned Kelly's armour, Bullio, Southern Highlands, New South Wales

Jerilderie, one of the towns Kelly robbed, built its police station featuring numerous structural components mimicking his distinctive face plate. Some examples include walls made of differently toned bricks making up his image to storm drains with holes cut in them to form it.

An image of Kelly, based on Sidney Nolan's imagery, appeared in the "Tin Symphony" segment of the opening ceremony for the year 2000 Olympic Games. He has also appeared in advertisements, most notably in television spots for Bushell's tea. A man drinking tea in the iconic suit of armour is the focal point of part of the ad.

Australia Post produced a stamp/envelope set The Siege of Glenrowan – Centenary 1980 to mark the capture of Kelly 100 years before. The 22-cent 'stamp' printed on the envelope shows Kelly 'at bay' wearing his armoured helmet and Colt revolver in hand.

Pope Products manufactured a die-cast "Ned Kelly" repeating cap pistol, which was widely marketed in the mid-1940s. Its design bore no obvious attempt at historic relevance.

== Visual arts ==
The distinctive homemade armour Kelly wore for his final unsuccessful stand against the police was the subject of a famous series of paintings by Sidney Nolan.

Ned Kelly is a recurring theme in the work of Ha-Ha (Regan Tamanui), one of Melbourne's foremost street artists. Since 2002, he has put up many stencils of Ned Kelly's face in the laneways of Melbourne, which have become an icon of Melbourne street art. He described Kelly as "the Robin Hood of the southern hemisphere". According to curator Jaklyn Babington, Ha-Ha's stencils are "a play on the pop movement's obsession with repetition, with a nod to Andy Warhol's celebrity portraits and a humorous Australian art historical reference to the most famous of our national painting cycles, Nolan's Ned Kelly series." In 2009, a triptych by Ha-Ha entitled Ned's Head was acquired by the National Gallery of Australia. He also participated in a Ned Kelly-themed group exhibition, staged in Singapore in 2013. The aim of the exhibition was to showcase Kelly's "rebel spirit" to a country which traditionally has a "significant respect for authority".

Former criminal and celebrity Chopper Read produced numerous paintings of Ned Kelly, alluding directly to Sidney Nolan's imagery. One of Read's paintings features Kelly with a woman's breasts. He explained that "it relates to the fact that I think Kelly was a homosexual, ... I'm not really a fan of his. I'm tired of people calling me the modern-day Ned Kelly." However, Read compared himself with Kelly in some of his paintings. One such self-portrait titled Tast Ful Old Criminal [sic] was purchased amid controversy by the State Library of Victoria in 2003.

== Film ==
Perhaps in all the realms of fiction no more romantic and sensational subject could be found for a biograph film.

— The Sun on Ned Kelly in its review of the 1910 re-release of The Story of the Kelly Gang (1906)

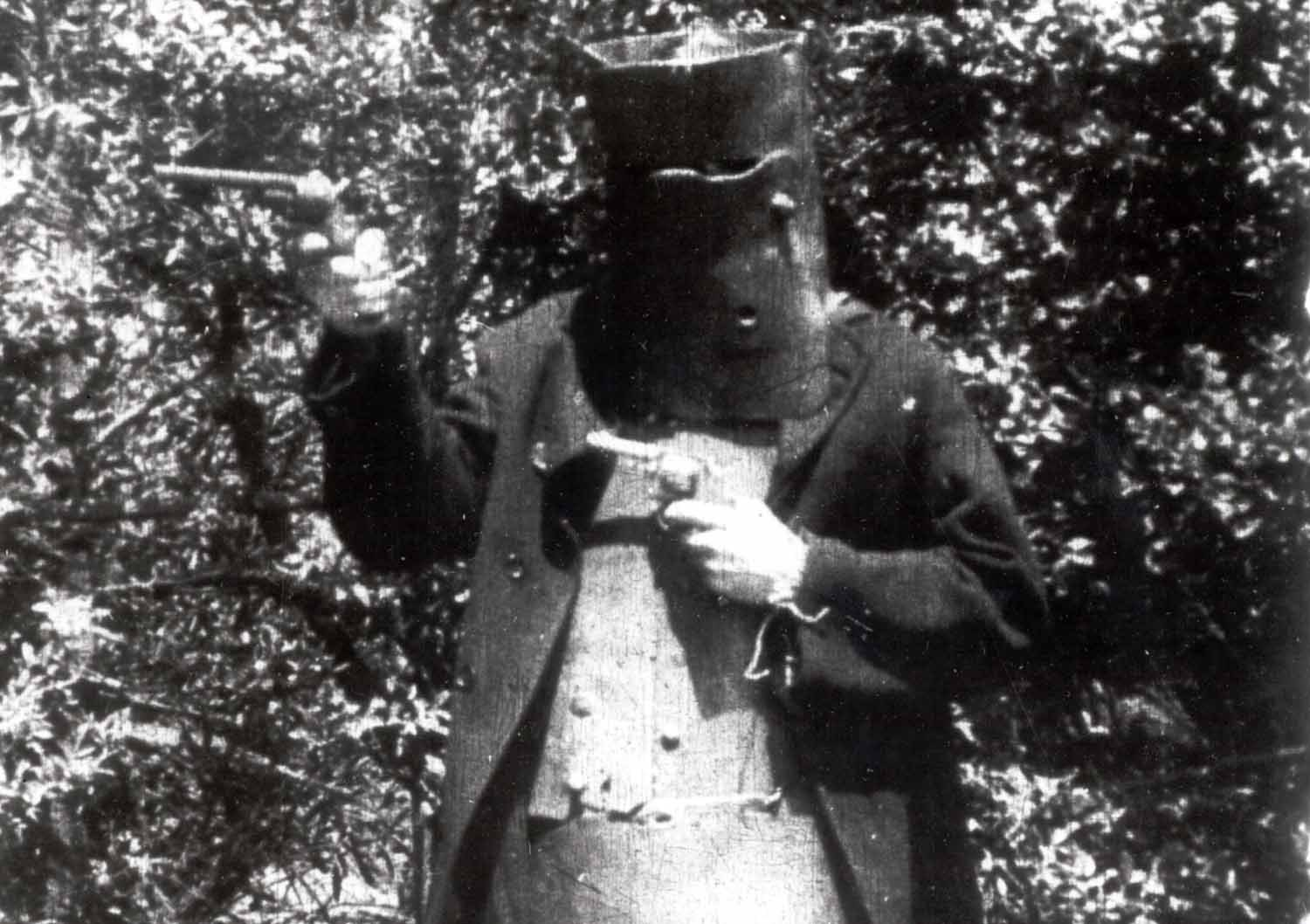
Actor portraying Kelly in The Story of the Kelly Gang (1906)

The Story of the Kelly Gang (1906), now recognised as the world's first feature-length film, had a then-unprecedented running time of 60 minutes. One of the actual suits worn by the gang (believed to be Joe Byrne's) was borrowed from a private collection and worn in the film. Two pieces of film totalling 21 minutes still exist and one piece includes the key scene of the Kelly's last stand.

Harry Southwell wrote, directed and produced three films based on the Kelly Gang: The Kelly Gang (1920), When the Kellys Were Out (1923) and When the Kellys Rode (1934), as well as the unfinished A Message to Kelly (1947).

The Glenrowan Affair was produced by Rupert Kathner in 1951, featuring the exploits of Kelly and his "wild colonial boys" on their journey of treachery, violence, murder and terror, told from the perspective of an ageing Dan Kelly. It starred Bob Chitty, a well-known Australian rules footballer, as Ned Kelly.

In 1967, independent filmmaker Garry Shead directed and produced Stringybark Massacre, an avant garde re-creation of the murder of the three police officers at Stringybark Creek.

The next major film of the Kelly story was Ned Kelly (1970), directed by Tony Richardson and starring Mick Jagger of The Rolling Stones as Ned Kelly. It was not a success and during its making it led to a protest by Australian Actors Equity over the importation of Jagger, with complaints from Kelly family descendants and others over the film being shot in New South Wales, rather than in the Victorian locations where most of the events actually took place.

Yahoo Serious wrote, directed and starred in the 1993 satire film Reckless Kelly as a descendant of Ned Kelly.

In 2003, Ned Kelly, a $30 million budget movie about Kelly's life was released. Directed by Gregor Jordan with a script by John Michael McDonagh (brother of Martin McDonagh), it stars Heath Ledger as Kelly, along with Orlando Bloom, Geoffrey Rush, and Naomi Watts. Based on Robert Drewe's book Our Sunshine, the film covers the period from Kelly's arrest for horse theft as a teenager to the gang's armour-clad battle at Glenrowan. It attempts to portray the events from the perspectives of both Kelly and of the authorities responsible for his capture and prosecution and throws in a romance between Kelly and a married upper-class Australian woman. It was not a success; one review dismissed it as fiction.

That same year (2003) a low budget satire movie called Ned was released. Written, directed and starring Abe Forsythe, it depicted the Kelly gang wearing fake beards and tin buckets on their heads.

In 2019, the film True History of the Kelly Gang was produced, which was adapted from Peter Carey's novel of the same name, and Justin Kurzel serving as director. The cast includes George MacKay as Ned Kelly and Russell Crowe as Harry Power, Kelly's mentor in bushranging.

== Television ==
Ned Kelly was depicted on television in Ned Kelly (1959) and Ballad for One Gun (1963).

Ian Jones and the late Bronwyn Binns wrote a script for a four-part television mini-series, The Last Outlaw (1980), which they co-produced. The series premiered on the centenary of the day that Kelly was hanged. The film's detailed historical accuracy distinguished it from many other Kelly films. Actor John Jarratt starred as Kelly.

In the 1990s British ads for the cereal Weetabix implied that it made the eater so strong and powerful that others would become terrified of them. One such TV ad had Kelly in full armour in a hut under siege by the police. As the officer in charge calls for his surrender, Kelly emerges from the hut with a spoon and cereal bowl, threatening to "eat the Weetabix" if they make a false move. The officer tells his men to stand back since this is shown not to be a false threat. One of them cocks his rifle, whereupon Kelly brings the spoon to his mouth only to find that the mouthpiece in his helmet is too small for the spoon. Thus he cannot carry out his threat and is forced to surrender.

In the late 2000s, a Nurofen advertisement featured Ned Kelly in his last stand at Glenrowan, engaging in a firefight against police officers besieging the Glenrowan Hotel, which he is occupying. Midway through the fight, Ned suffers a headache, and withdraws into the hotel. Removing his helmet and placing it on a nearby table, Ned slumps against a fireplace, pulls a box of Nurofen tablets out of his coat pocket and consumes a tablet, giving him immediate relief from his headache. After a few seconds of relief, Ned is snapped back to reality when police officers fire at the hotel, destroying a clock sitting on the mantelpiece above him. Remembering that his helmet is sitting on a table near him, he pushes it in front of the window. Seeing the helmet in the window, the police mistake it for being Ned and fire at it. This distraction allows Ned to escape the hotel via the back door, and by the time the police realise the ruse, Ned is galloping away on a horse.

== Music ==
Waylon Jennings recorded "Blame it on the Kellys" which was included in the soundtrack for the 1970 film Ned Kelly. In 1971, US country singer Johnny Cash wrote and recorded the song "Ned Kelly" for his album The Man in Black.

"Shelter for my Soul" was written and recorded by Powderfinger frontman Bernard Fanning for the 2003 film Ned Kelly. It was written from Kelly's perspective on death row and played over the movie's closing credits. The Australian band The Kelly Gang formed in 2002, consisting of Jack Nolan, Scott Aplin, Rick Grossman (bassist for Hoodoo Gurus) and Rob Hirst (drummer for Midnight Oil). They recorded one album, Looking for the Sun (2004), which features Sidney Nolan's 1945 painting Kelly in the Bush on the cover.

== Video games ==
The 2002 video game Ty The Tasmanian Tiger features a mini-boss named Neddy. He wears Kelly's iconic armour and helmet.

The video game Borderlands: The Pre-Sequel features a boss called Red Belly, a bandit who wears Kelly's iconic armour and helmet. An audio log reveals some humorous dialogue regarding the decision to omit leg armour from the design.

Corporal Kelly, an antagonist in Mark of the Ninja was named after Ned Kelly.

The online portion of Red Dead Redemption II features a mission where the protagonists don suits of armour similar to that used by Kelly and his gang in order to assault a fortress occupied by a hostile gang, with the armour being referred to as “Australian” by a US Marshall accompanying the players.

The first-person horror extraction shooter Hunt: Showdown features Ned Kelly himself as a DLC Legendary Hunter called "The Ironclad". His Legendary skin for the Mosin-Nagant M1891 Avtomat is titled "Such is Life" in reference to his reported last words.
