= Ned Kelly (2003 film) =

Film by Gregor Jordan

- Theatrical release poster
- Directed by: Gregor Jordan
- Screenplay by: John Michael McDonagh
- Based on: Our Sunshine by Robert Drewe
- Produced by: Lynda House; Nelson Woss
- Starring: Heath Ledger; Orlando Bloom; Naomi Watts; Geoffrey Rush
- Cinematography: Oliver Stapleton
- Edited by: Jon Gregory
- Music by: Klaus Badelt
- Production companies: StudioCanal; Working Title Films; Australian Film Commission; Film Finance Corporation Australia; The Woss Group; Endymion Films
- Distributed by: Universal Pictures (through United International Pictures)
- Release date: 27 March 2003
- Running time: 110 minutes
- Countries: Australia; United Kingdom
- Language: English
- Box office: $6.6 million

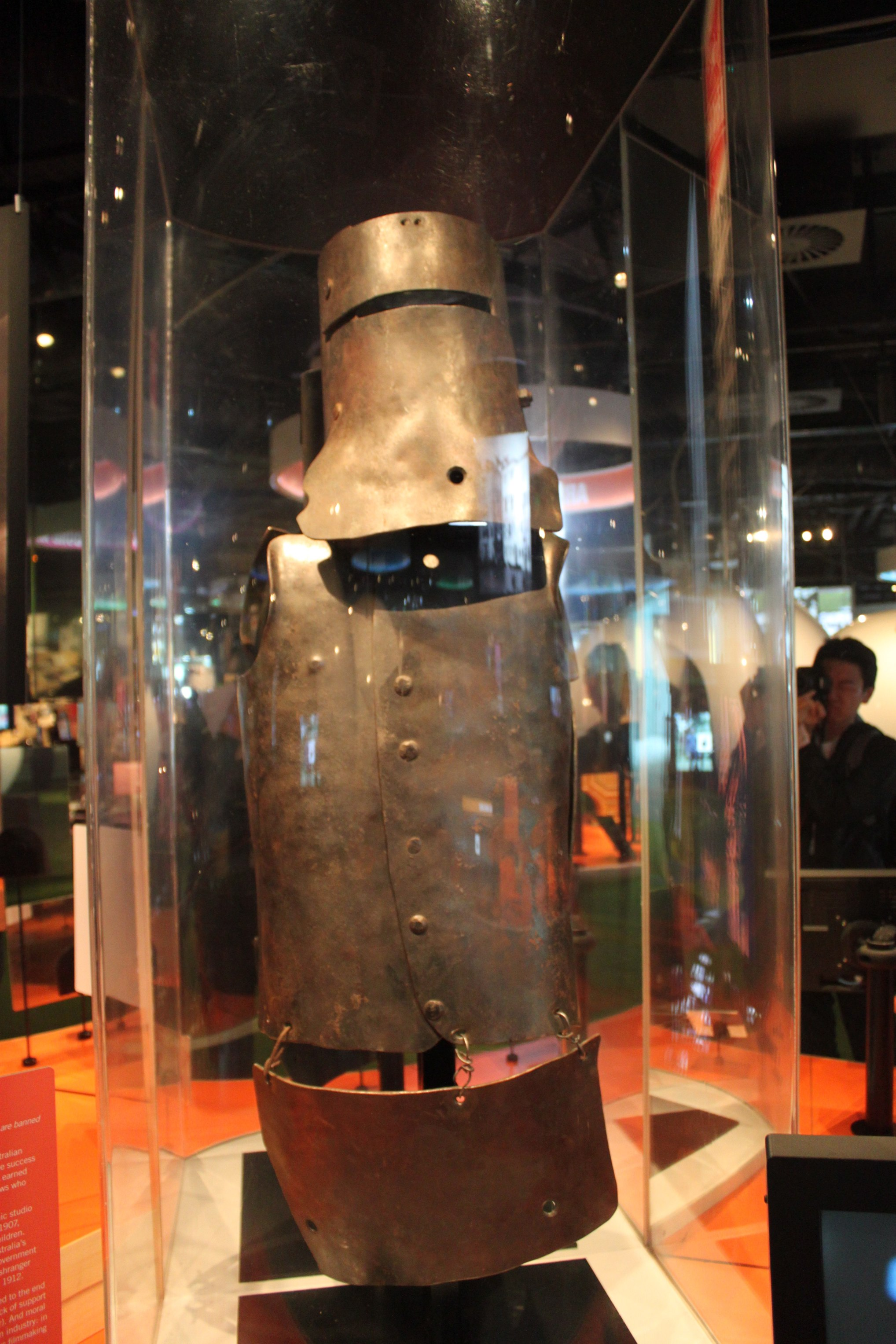
Replica of Ned Kelly's armour, designed for the film and now in the collection of the Australian Centre for the Moving Image

Ned Kelly is a 2003 bushranger film based on Robert Drewe's 1991 novel Our Sunshine. Directed by Gregor Jordan, the film's adapted screenplay was written by John Michael McDonagh. The film dramatises the life of Ned Kelly, a legendary bushranger and outlaw who was active mostly in the colony of Victoria. In the film, Kelly, his brother Dan, and two other associates—Steve Hart and Joe Byrne—form a gang of bushrangers in response to acts of police brutality. Heath Ledger stars in the title role, with Orlando Bloom, Naomi Watts and Geoffrey Rush. The film received mixed reviews from critics and grossed $6 million worldwide.

== Plot ==
After saving a young boy from drowning and being awarded a "hero sash" at the age of ten, Ned Kelly grows up in the colony of Victoria where he was born. The son of a Catholic Irish settler, he lives with his widowed mother Ellen, his younger brother Dan, and his two younger sisters Kate and Grace. Ned's best friend Joe and Dan's best friend Steve are also often at the house. One day in 1871, when Ned is 17 years old, he sees a white mare grazing alone. He rides it into town to impress a local girl named Jane. He is arrested, charged and convicted, and imprisoned for stealing the mare. But it was stolen by Wild Wright, an acquaintance.

After Ned is released and returns home three years later, he starts helping his family with their small horse-breeding farm located near Beechworth. He takes vengeance on Wild Wright by beating him in a bare-knuckle prizefight. He befriends Julia Cook, the beautiful wife of a wealthy landowner who lives nearby.

One night at a bar, a local constable named Fitzpatrick is harassing Ned's sister Kate. When Ned intervenes, hostilities erupt with Fitzpatrick and his fellow officers. To get back at Ned, they take the Kellys' horses, but with the help of his brother and their friends, Ned steals them back.

Some nights later, while Ned and Julia make love in the Cooks' stables, Fitzpatrick shows up at the Kelly farm and asks to see Kate. When she rejects him again, he tries to arrest Dan for horse stealing, invoking non-existent warrants for him and Ned. In the ensuing fight, Fitzpatrick is wounded, and falsely reports that Ned Kelly shot him. The police retaliate by arresting Ned's mother.

Ned asks Julia to testify he was with her the night Fitzpatrick was at the Kelly's farm. She refuses, saying that she would be disgraced by the acknowledgement of their affair and her husband would take her children away. Ned, Dan, Joe and Steve become outlaws on the run. They later meet a patrol in the bushland and kill three officers in a shoot-out, although Ned tried to avoid casualties. During the following months the "Kelly Gang" avoids capture, living in the bush, and often going hungry. On one occasion, Julia gives them shelter at her farm while her husband is away.

A large bounty is placed on their heads. The government issues a decree allowing anybody to shoot them on sight without consequences. The gang rob two banks and burn the mortgage documents relating to selectors. They give the money from their robberies to poor families in need, and soon become acclaimed as folk heroes by the Victorian population. The media depict them as violent criminals.

Fearing widespread revolt, the Colonial Government sends in Superintendent Francis Hare to suppress unrest. He arrests many sympathizers, including Joe's childhood friend Aaron.

When the police promise they will not harm Joe and say they are only after the Kelly brothers, Aaron agrees to work as an informant. During a quick visit to Beechworth, Joe learns that Aaron has been seen talking with cops. The gang decide to feed him false information about their next heist, to test his loyalty. When they see a large group of constables heading to the bank Aaron was told about, they know he betrayed them. Joe kills him at his house.

Ned devises a plan to foil Superintendent Hare. The gang lures him by taking over the town of Glenrowan. They gather all the townspeople, most of whom are friendly to their causes, at the Glenrowan Inn, to better protect them in the upcoming fight.

In the meantime, they sabotage the railroad tracks leading into town, to derail the train on which Hare and his army of constables are travelling. They've also built metal helmets and plates of body armour to survive bullets. They count on the derailment to kill most of the constables and plan to capture Hare and exchange him for Ned and Dan's mother.

The derailment does not take place, and hundreds of officers lay siege to the inn late at night. Determined to go out in a blaze of glory, the Kelly Gang emerge from the inn and begin shooting, protected by their armour, but are forced inside again. The police advance on the inn, killing innocent civilians during the shoot-out. To buy time for the townspeople to flee, Ned exits and charges forward alone; shot in the arms and legs, he falls out of sight.

Near dawn, Joe is shot and dies inside the inn. Dan and Steve, down to their last bullets and knowing all is lost, commit suicide. Ned regains consciousness. Gravely injured, he continues to fire at the police until he is overcome and they take him into custody. He is loaded onto the train to be taken back to face justice.

In the end, although 32,000 people have signed a petition asking the government for a pardon for Kelly, he is hanged at Old Melbourne Gaol on 11 November 1880.

== Cast ==
- Heath Ledger as Ned Kelly
- Orlando Bloom as Joe Byrne
- Geoffrey Rush as Superintendent Francis Hare
- Naomi Watts as Julia Cook
- Joel Edgerton as Aaron Sherritt
- Laurence Kinlan as Dan Kelly
- Philip Barantini as Steve Hart
- Kerry Condon as Kate Kelly
- Kris McQuade as Ellen Kelly
- Emily Browning as Grace Kelly
- Erika Felton as young Ellen Kelly
- Peter Phelps as Constable Lonigan
- Kiri Paramore as Constable Fitzpatrick
- Rachel Griffiths as Susan Scott
- Geoff Morrell as Robert Scott
- Charles Tingwell as Premier Graham Berry
- Andrew Formosa as Park Ranger
- Saskia Burmeister as Jane Jones
- Talia Zucker as Sarah Wicks
- Jonathan Hardy as The Great Orlando
- Nicholas Bell as Richard Cook
- Russell Dykstra as Wild Wright
- Victoria Eagger as Mrs Shelton
- Jerome Ehlers as Sherritt Trooper
- Damian Walshe-Howling as Glenrowan Policeman

== Production ==
=== Casting ===
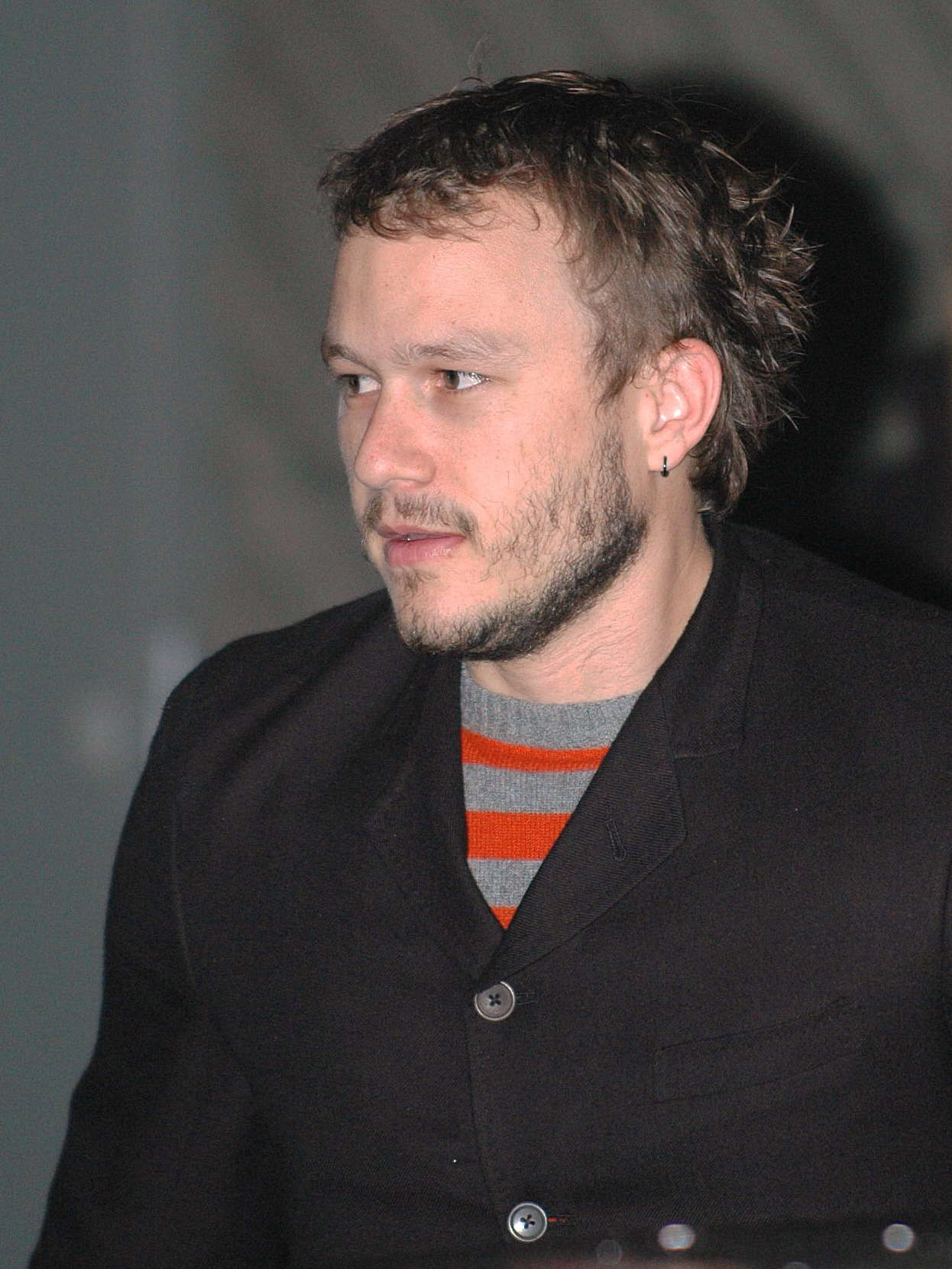
Heath Ledger
(Ned Kelly)

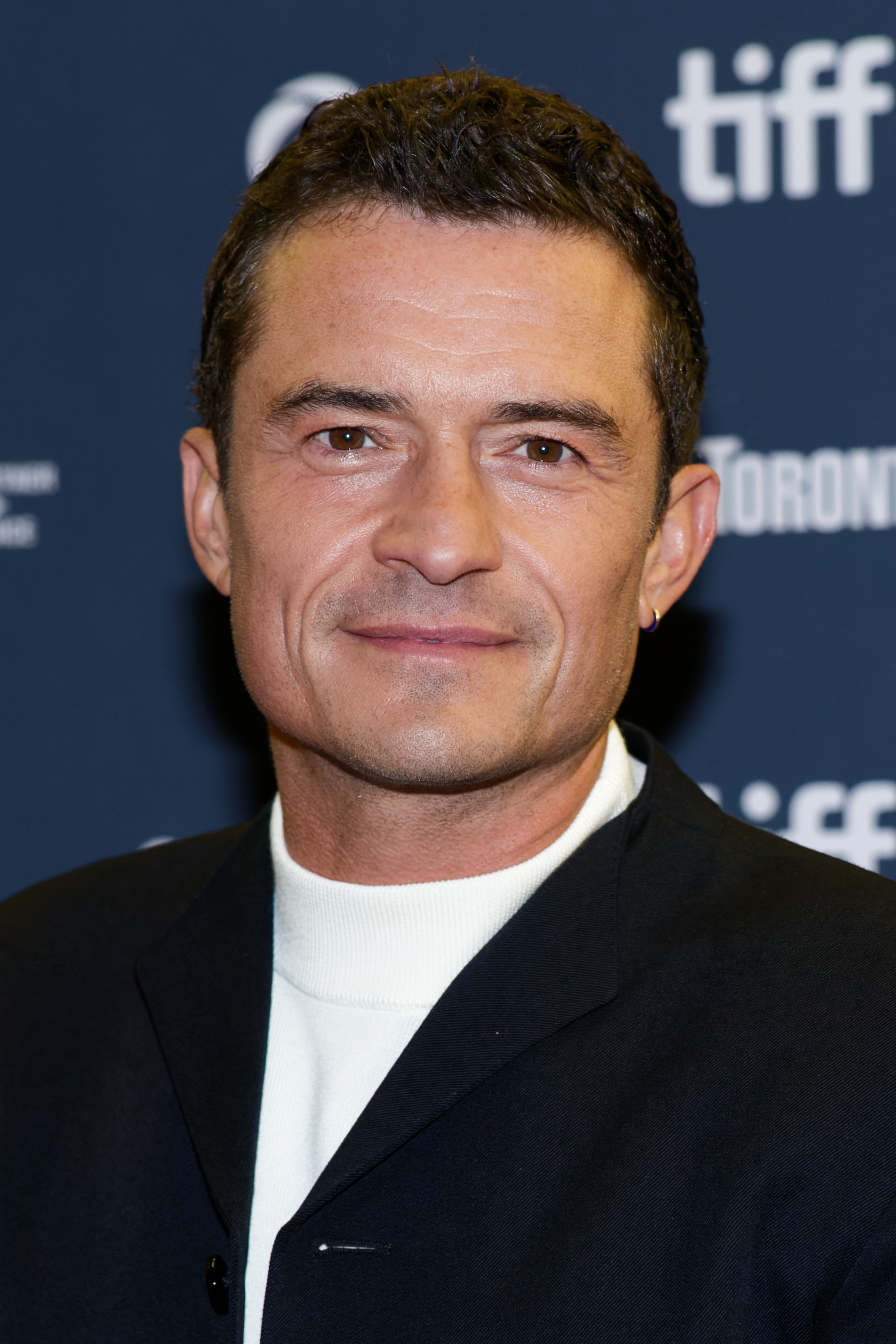
Orlando Bloom
(Joe Byrne)

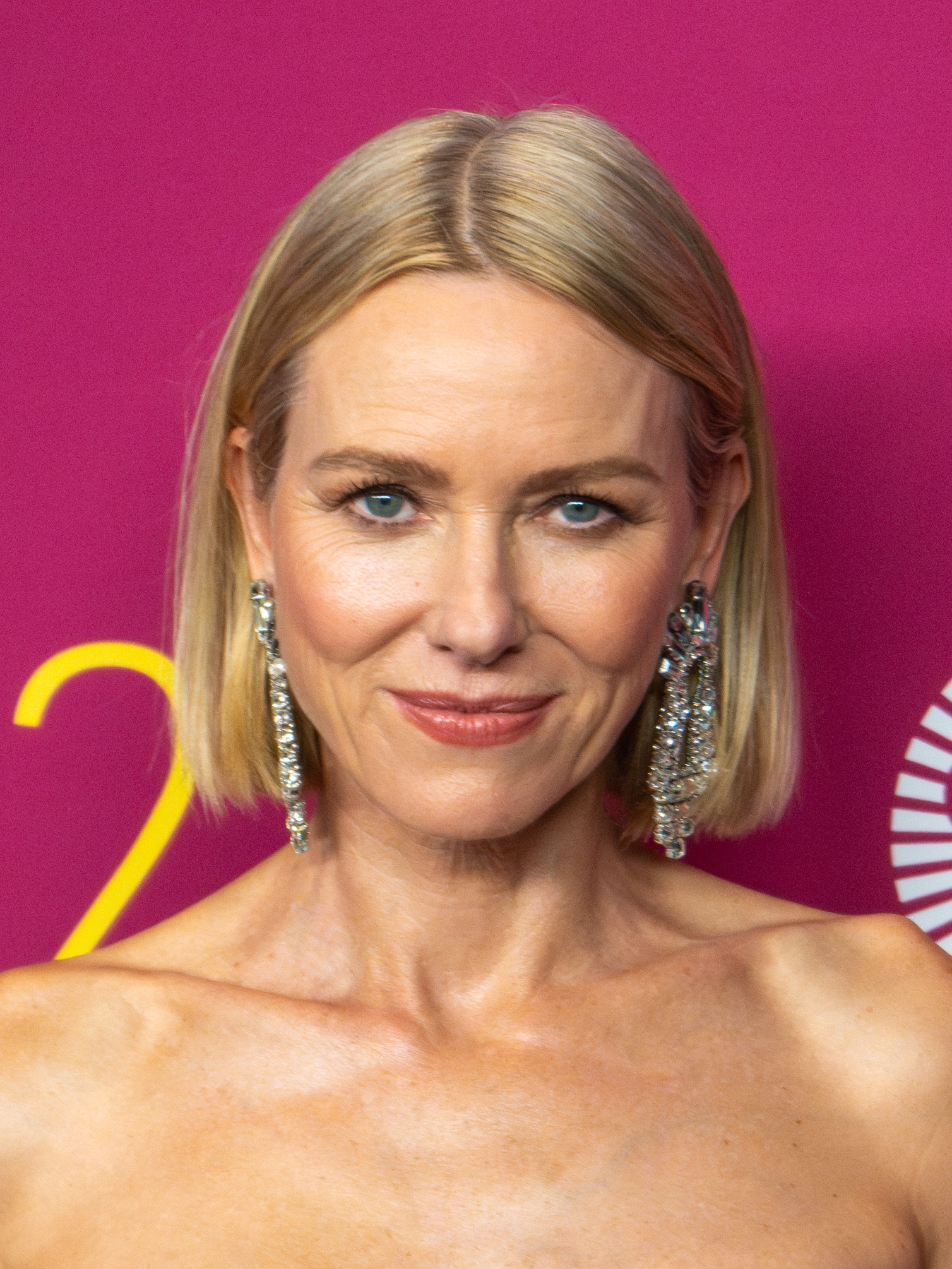
Naomi Watts
(Julia Cook)

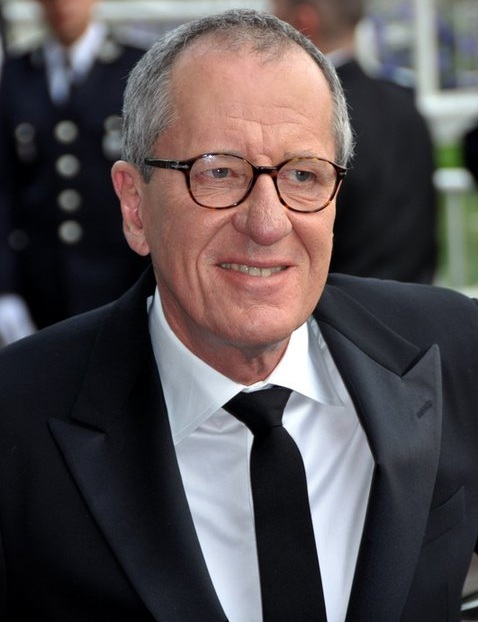
Geoffrey Rush
(Hare)

The cast includes top-notch actors, such as Heath Ledger (with whom Jordan had already worked in Two Hands) in the part of Ned Kelly, Orlando Bloom in the part of his right-hand man Joe Byrne, Naomi Watts and Geoffrey Rush in secondary but important roles.

=== Filming ===
Filming locations in Australia

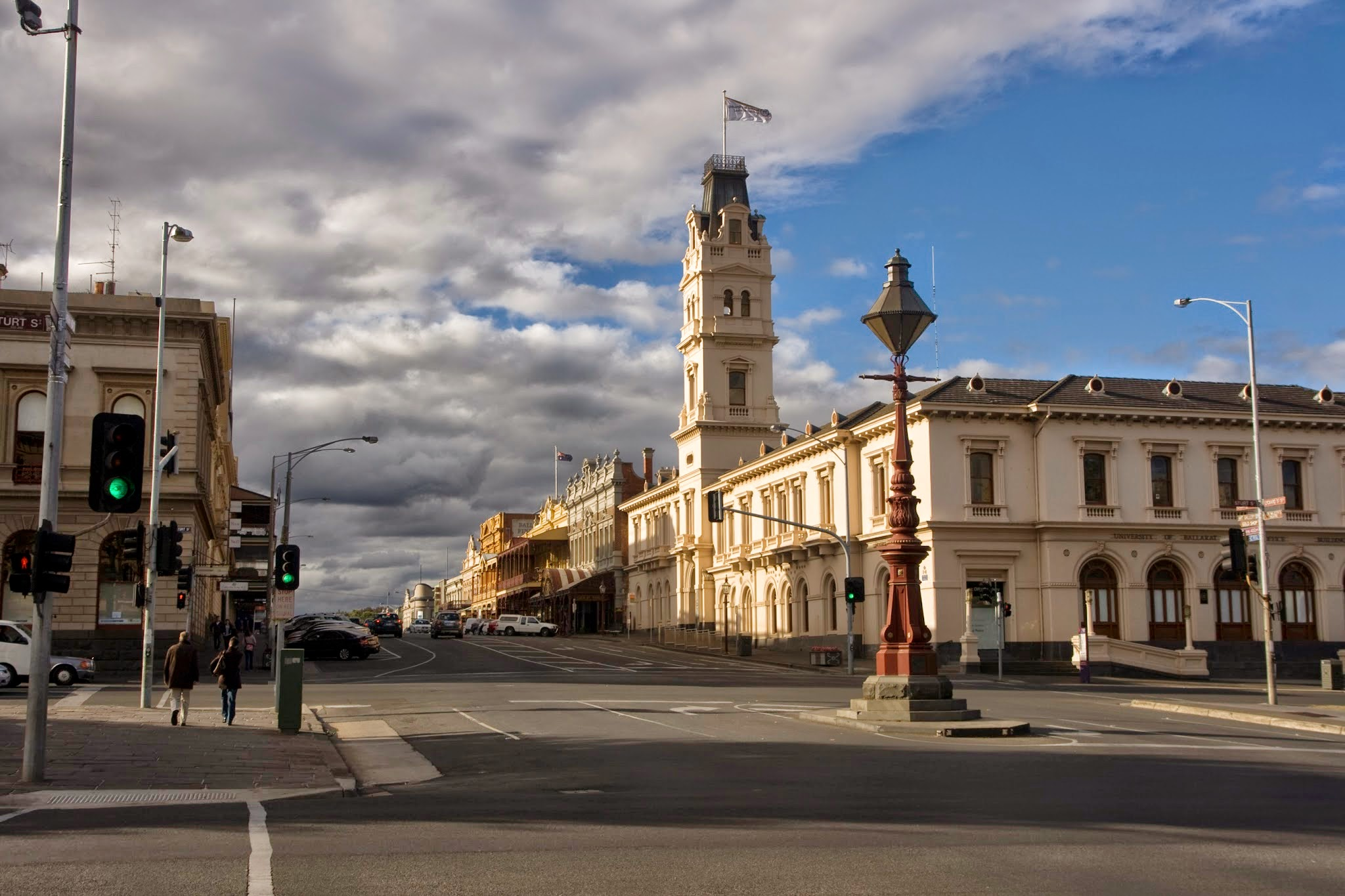
Ballarat (Melbourne)

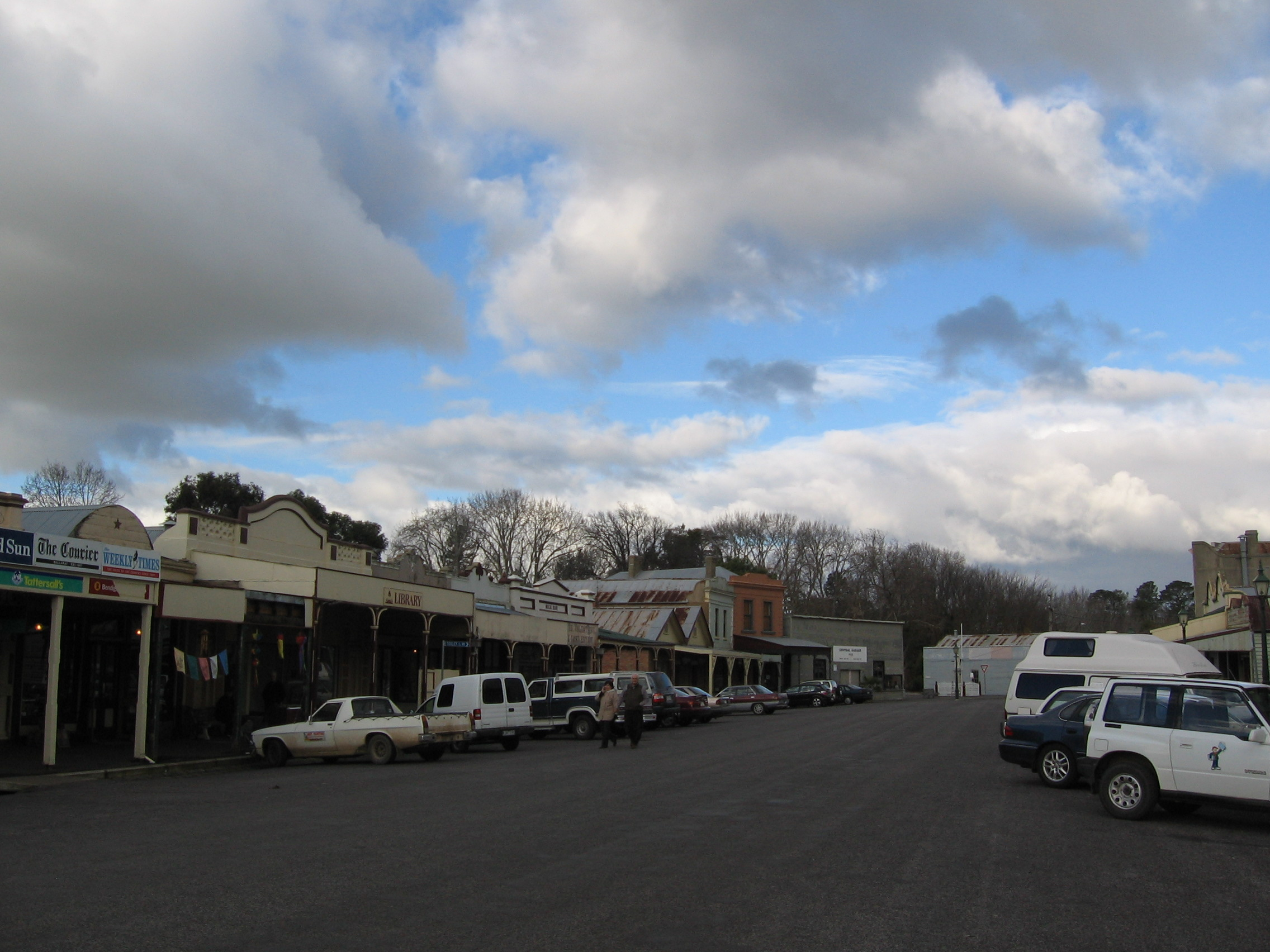
Clunes, Victoria

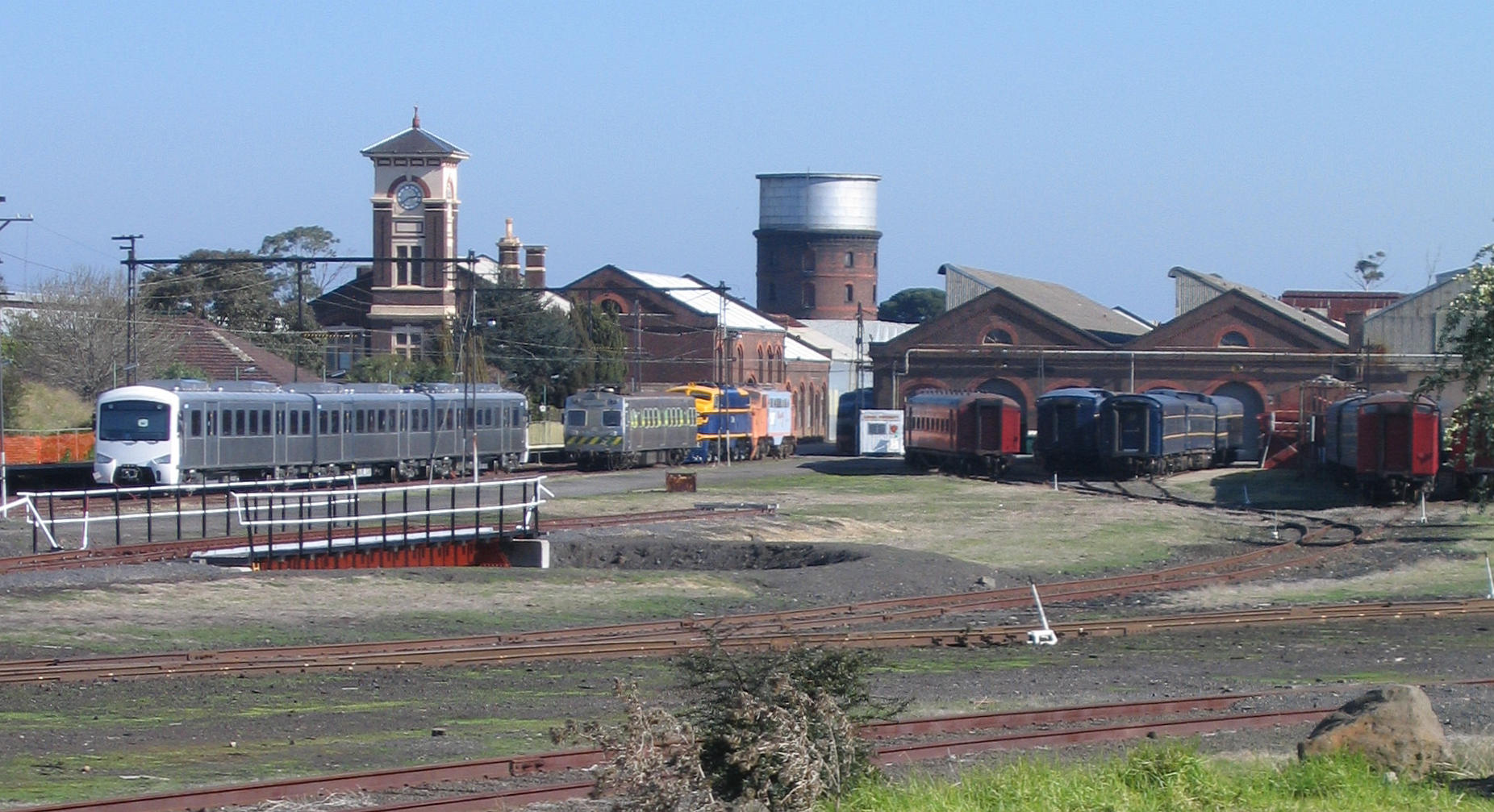
Newport Workshops

Principal photography started on 29 April 2002, Most of the filming was done at the Little River Earth Sanctuary, Mount Rothwell, near Geelong. Street scenes were filmed in Clunes and Ballarat. Other locations include Broadford, Glenfern House in St Kilda East, Hepburn Springs and Melbourne.

== Soundtrack ==
Ned Kelly [Music From The Motion Picture]

Soundtrack album by Klaus Badelt
- Released: 6 April 2003
- Length: 56:48

The album Ned Kelly – Music from the Motion Picture was released on Decca Records on 6 April 2003. The film score was by Klaus Badelt. Bernard Fanning sings "Shelter for My Soul", and "Moreton Bay".

No.	Title	Length
1.	"Shelter for My Soul"	04:51
2.	"Saving A Life"	03:17
3.	"Ned Kelly"	05:37
4.	"Destiny"	04:24
5.	"The Light"	02:00
6.	"Julia"	01:21
7.	"Stringybark Creek"	03:21
8.	"Back Home"	06:23
9.	"Moreton Bay"	02:50
10.	"Doomed"	05:11
11.	"Outlaws"	05:31
12.	"The Jerilderie Letter"	02:08
13.	"Father"	01:29
14.	"The Glenrowan Inn"	07:01
15.	"Remembering Ned Kelly"	01:24
Total length:		56:48

== Reception ==
In total, the film grossed $5,040,860 internationally, $86,959 in the United States and $6,585,516 worldwide.

The film received mixed reviews. On the review aggregator website Rotten Tomatoes, 55% of 60 critics' reviews are positive, with an average rating of 5.6/10. The website's consensus reads: "More depth about the legendary outlaw would be welcome, but as it is, Ned Kelly is a reasonably entertaining Western." Metacritic, which uses a weighted average, assigned the film a score of 56 out of 100, based on 16 critics, indicating "mixed or average" reviews.

A review of the film comments "Heath Ledger gives a solid performance in the lead but Orlando Bloom and Geoffrey Rush are woefully underused." BBC film reviewer Nev Pierce gave the film 3 out of 5 stars, stating "there is some impressive action, albeit great scenes rather than sequences", concluding with "a rousing, watchable western". Jay Richardson from FutureMovies.co.uk stated "this is a competent and blandly enjoyable film with a solid central performance from Heath Ledger".

Megan Spencer from ABC.net said, "Thankfully Ned Kelly is a very cinematic Australian film, the international and local cast and crew made the most of their $30 million budget. And some of the best sequences are due in part to Heath Ledger's well delivered internal dialogue voice over, giving an inner life to the musings of a troubled anti-hero". Clint Morris, a reviewer from Film Threat, who gave the film 3 and half stars out of 5, said "It's an exciting movie filled with plenty of action, adventure, beautiful cinematography and best of all, terrific performances". He specifically praised Ledger: "Heath Ledger is fantastic as Kelly. He gives a very immersing performance, and has misshapen himself into the character. When he wears that infamous tin helmet in the finale, we actually feel that's the real deal."

More critically, one review describes the battle for Glenrowan, with masses of police and civilian casualties, along with a lion and monkey, as "fictional nonsense".

=== Awards and nominations ===
Award	Category	Subject	Result
AACTA Award (2003 Australian Film Institute Awards)	Best Direction	Gregor Jordan	Nominated
AACTA Award (2003 Australian Film Institute Awards)	Best Adapted Screenplay	John Michael McDonagh	Nominated
AACTA Award (2003 Australian Film Institute Awards)	Best Actor	Heath Ledger	Nominated
AACTA Award (2003 Australian Film Institute Awards)	Best Supporting Actor	Orlando Bloom	Nominated
AACTA Award (2003 Australian Film Institute Awards)	Best Cinematography	Oliver Stapleton	Nominated
AACTA Award (2003 Australian Film Institute Awards)	Best Editing	Jon Gregory	Nominated
AACTA Award (2003 Australian Film Institute Awards)	Best Sound	Gary Wilkins	Nominated
AACTA Award (2003 Australian Film Institute Awards)	Best Sound	Colin Miller	Nominated
AACTA Award (2003 Australian Film Institute Awards)	Best Sound	Adrian Rhodes	Nominated
AACTA Award (2003 Australian Film Institute Awards)	Best Sound	Chris Burden	Nominated
AACTA Award (2003 Australian Film Institute Awards)	Best Production Design	Steven Jones-Evans	Won
AACTA Award (2003 Australian Film Institute Awards)	Best Costume Design	Anna Borghazi	Won

== See also ==
- Cultural depictions of Ned Kelly
