= The Shark Net (book) =

Book by Robert Drewe

- Author: Robert Drewe
- Language: English
- Publisher: Penguin Books, Australia
- Publication date: 2000
- Publication place: Australia
- Media type: Print
- Pages: 358
- ISBN: 0670868191

The Shark Net (1996) is a memoir by Australian author Robert Drewe. Subtitled Memories and Murder, the book talks of growing up in Perth from the mid 1960s during a time marked by serial killer Eric Edgar Cooke, with Drewe's personal connection to the killer and later his reporting on Cooke's trial.

== Reception ==
Robert Dowling in the Age wrote "It will offend no one and appeal to the nostalgia market for its watercolor of place, but there is no inner illumination. Drewe is shining a journalist's weak and objective light on his life, from outside. He has researched and reported on it as though he has not lived it. He has written his own, detailed and interesting, obituary." Cassandra Pybus, writing in the Sydney Morning Herald, finishes "As Drewe shows us most beautifully, to have a secure and tranquil world we must first find a way to eradicate the hurt that festers and grows poisonous in the dark places of the soul." The West Australian's Rod Moran called it a compelling read and notes "Drewe's work presents a marvellous combination of personal memoir, reportage, imaginative recreation and what might be called a journalist's anthropology of 1960s suburban Perth." The Australian Financial Review's Gerard Windsor says "The Shark Net is just not really that ambitious. It's a wealth of good stories and Australian anthropology, but there's a family centre stage and the spots are never turned on. It's a pleasant book, a seaside book, but not an exciting one." In the New York Times Rob Nixon says it "has a surface calm and an undertow of menace." He writes that it "has a mixed-genre feel: a coming-of-age story with undertones of noir memoir Drewe tracks brilliantly the emotional challenges of a bicoastal boyhood, Australian style." Sebastian Smee in London's the Times says it "deserves to be listed alongside J. M. Coetzee's superb Boyhood."

== Awards and nominations ==
- 2000 joint winner Western Australian Premier's Book Awards — Non-Fiction
- 2000 joint winner The Courier-Mail Book of the Year Award — Book of the Year

== Adaptation ==
The book was adapted into a television mini-series of the same name which was broadcast by the ABC in 2003.
