= The Shark Net (TV series) =

2003 Australian mini series

- Written by: Ian David
- Directed by: Graeme Burfoot
- Starring: William McInnes; Angie Milliken; Tim Draxl
- Music by: Alan John
- Country of origin: Australia
- Original language: English

Production
- Producer: Sue Taylor
- Cinematography: Malcolm McCulloch
- Editor: Meredith Watson Jeffrey
- Running time: 180 minutes

Original release
- Release: 10 August – 24 August 2003

The Shark Net is an Australian TV mini-series that was broadcast in 2003. It was based on the book of the same name by Robert Drewe about growing up around the times of Eric Edgar Cooke's crimes. The story spans 14 years when Drewe was in Perth while Cooke committed 20 murders and was brought to trial.

== Cast ==
- William McInnes as Roy Drewe
- Angie Milliken as Dorothy Drewe
- Tim Draxl as Robert Drewe
- Leeanna Walsman as Ruth Parnham
- Dan Wyllie as Eric Cooke
- Warren Mitchell as Ralph Wheatley
- Angus Edwards as Young Robert Drewe
- Andrew Supanz as Billy Drewe
- Joshua York as Young Billy Drewe

== Production ==
The Shark Net was filmed in Perth with a budget around $5 million and featured a cast of 123 with over 1000 extras.

== Reception ==
Amanda Keenan of The Australian wrote "The story progresses in a slow, measured way and may require a little perseverance -- much like the book -- but it is worth it.". Writing in the Age Barbara Hook says "[Ian] David extracts every moment of humour from The Shark Net, and it has a strong thread of criminal suspense going for it, but its self-conscious determination to be taken seriously as a literary work interferes with its entertainment value."

== Awards ==
- 2003 Australian Film Institute Awards
  - Best Telefeature or Mini-Series - Sue Taylor - nominated
- Logie Awards of 2004
  - Logie Award for Most Outstanding Actor - Tim Draxl - nominated
  - Logie Award for Most Outstanding Actor - William McInnes - nominated
  - Logie Award for Most Outstanding Actress - Angie Milliken - nominated
  - Most Outstanding Mini Series or Telemovie - nominated
