= Our Sunshine =

1991 novel by Robert Drewe

- Author: Robert Drewe
- Language: English
- Publisher: Pan Macmillan, Australia
- Publication date: 1991
- Publication place: Australia
- Media type: Print (Hardback & Paperback)
- Pages: 189
- ISBN: 0330273264
- Preceded by: Fortune
- Followed by: The Drowner

Our Sunshine is a 1991 novel about Ned Kelly by Australian writer Robert Drewe.

It later served as a source of information for the 2003 film Ned Kelly, directed by Gregor Jordan and starring Heath Ledger, Orlando Bloom, Geoffrey Rush and Naomi Watts.

== Awards and nominations ==
- 1992 shortlisted NBC Banjo Awards — NBC Banjo Award for Fiction
- 1992 shortlisted Miles Franklin Award
