= Robert Drewe =

Australian author

- Born: 9 January 1943 (age 83); Melbourne, Victoria, Australia
- Education: Hale School
- Occupations: Author; columnist
- Children: 6
- Writing career
- Language: English
- Period: 1976–present
- Notable awards: Walkley Award (2); Colin Roderick Award
- Website: www.robertdrewe.com

Robert Duncan Drewe (born 9 January 1943) is an Australian novelist, non-fiction and short story writer.

== Biography ==
Robert Drewe was born on 9 January 1943 in Melbourne, Victoria. At the age of six, he moved with his family to Perth. He grew up on the West Australian coast and was educated at Hale School.

He joined The West Australian as a cadet reporter. Three years later he was recruited by The Age, where he became Sydney chief at the age of 21, later Literary Editor of The Australian. He was a columnist, features editor and special writer on The Australian and The Bulletin.

Drewe won two Walkley Awards for journalism while working for The Bulletin. He was awarded a Leader Grant travel scholarship by the United States Government.

During the 1970s he turned from journalism to writing fiction, beginning with The Savage Crows in 1976, followed by A Cry in the Jungle Bar, The Bodysurfers, Fortune, The Bay of Contented Men, Our Sunshine, The Drowner, Grace and The Rip, as well as a prize-winning memoir, The Shark Net, and the non-fiction Walking Ella.

Fortune won the fiction category of the National Book Council Award, The Bay of Contented Men won a Commonwealth Writers' Prize for the best book in Australasia and South-East Asia, and The Drowner made Australian literary history by becoming the first novel to win the Premier's Literary Prize in every state. It also won the Australian Book of the Year Prize, the Adelaide Festival Prize for literature and was voted one of the ten best international novels of the decade. The Shark Net won the Western Australian Premier's Prize for Non-Fiction, the Courier Mail Book of the Year Prize and the Vision Australia Award.

Our Sunshine was made into a 2003 film, retitled Ned Kelly, directed by Gregor Jordan and starring Heath Ledger, Orlando Bloom and Naomi Watts. The Shark Net was adapted for an ABC-BBC-produced international television mini-series of the same name and a BBC radio drama. The Bodysurfers also became a successful ABC and BBC TV mini-series and was adapted for radio and the theatre.

Drewe was also the editor of two short-story anthologies, The Penguin Book of the Beach and The Penguin Book of the City, and edited Best Australian Stories in 2006 and 2007 and Best Australian Essays in 2010. He has been a Sydney Morning Herald film critic, and his play, South American Barbecue, was first performed at Sydney's Belvoir Street Theatre in 1991.

He was awarded an Australian arts scholarship by Prime Minister, Paul Keating. He has also received an honorary doctorate in literature from the University of Queensland, and an honorary doctorate of letters from the University of Western Australia.

Drewe has been a member of the Literature Board of the Australia Council and the management committees of the Australian Society of Authors, the Sydney Writers' Festival, and the Byron Bay Writers Festival.

In 2019 Drewe won the Colin Roderick Award for his book The True Colour of the Sea. The True Colour of the Sea was shortlisted for the 2019 University of Southern Queensland Steele Rudd Award for a Short Story Collection at the Queensland Literary Awards.

== Personal life ==
Drewe has six children from three marriages. (A son died in 2019.) He and his wife Tracy divide their time between the New South Wales north coast and North Fremantle, Western Australia.

== Bibliography ==
=== Novels ===
- The Savage Crows (1976) ISBN 978-0-14-100799-1
- A Cry in the Jungle Bar (1979) ISBN 978-1-74228-343-2
- Fortune (1986) ISBN 978-1-74228-349-4
- Our Sunshine (1991) ISBN 978-1-74228-352-4
- The Drowner (1996) ISBN 978-0-14-100802-8
- Grace (2005) ISBN 978-1-74228-003-5
- Whipbird (2017) ISBN 978-0-14-379194-2
- Nimblefoot (2022) ISBN 978-0-14-378645-0

=== Short story collections ===
- The Bodysurfers (1983) ISBN 978-0-14-100801-1
- The Bay of Contented Men (1989) ISBN 978-1-74228-457-6
- The Rip (2008) ISBN 978-0-14-300966-5
- The Local Wildlife (2013) ISBN 978-1-92-642848-2
- The True Colour of the Sea (2018) ISBN 978-0-14-378268-1

=== Non-fiction ===
- Walking Ella: A Dog Day Dossier (1998) ISBN 1-876-23307-9 (later Walking Ella: Ruminations of a Reluctant Dog-walker ISBN 978-0-670-02962-4)
- The Shark Net: Memories and Murder (2000) ISBN 978-0-14-100196-8
- The Seventh Wave: Photographs of Australian Beaches (with Trent Parke) (2000) ISBN 0-646-39747-8
- Perth (with Frances Andrijich and Jeff Bell) (2005) ISBN 978-1-920731-40-3
- Sand (with John Kinsella) (2010) ISBN 978-1-921361-88-3
- Montebello: A Memoir (2012) ISBN 978-1-74253-662-0
- The Local Wildlife (2013) ISBN 978-1-74253-745-0
- Swimming to the Moon (2014) ISBN 978-1-921696-10-7
- The Beach: An Australian Passion (2015) ISBN 978-0-642-27880-7

=== Drama ===
- The Bodysurfers: The Play (1989)
- South American Barbecue (1991)

=== As editor ===
- Bondi (1984)
- Yacker: Australian Writers Talk About Their Work (1986) (with Candida Baker)
- The Picador Book of the Beach (1993) ISBN 978-0-330-27417-3 (later The Penguin Book of the Beach ISBN 978-0-14-300637-4)
- The Penguin Book of the City (1997) ISBN 978-0-14-100777-9
- Best Australian Stories 2006 (2006) ISBN 978-1-86395-270-5
- Best Australian Stories 2007 (2007) ISBN 978-1-86395-418-1
- Best Australian Essays 2010 (2010) ISBN 978-1-86395-494-5
