= Francis Augustus Hare =

Pioneer settler in Australia (1830–1892)

Francis Augustus Hare P.M.
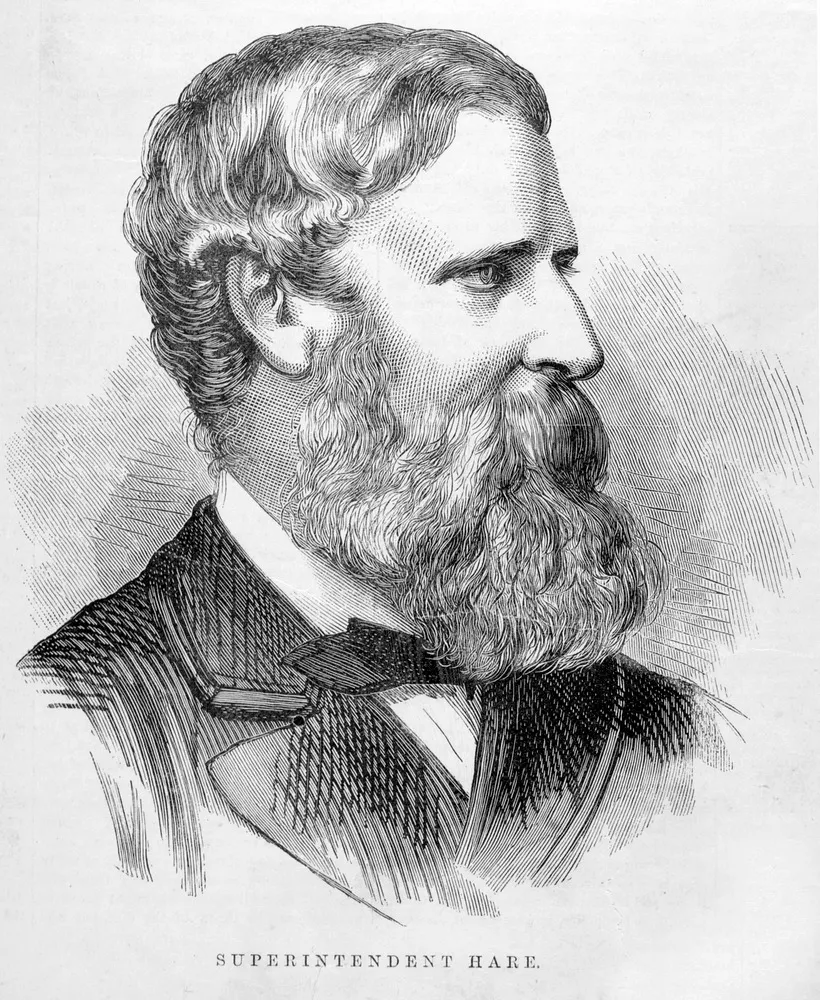
- Born: 4 October 1830; Wynberg, Cape Colony
- Died: 9 July 1892 (aged 61); Rupertswood, Colony of Victoria
- Police career
- Branch: Victorian Mounted Police
- Rank: Superintendent

Francis Augustus ("Frank") Hare (1830–1892) was a South African born British pioneer settler and police superintendent in the colony of Victoria in Australia, best known for his role in the capture of the notorious bushrangers known as the Kelly gang at the town of Glenrowan in north-west Victoria.

Born in the Cape Colony in 1830 and educated there, after a stint working on his older brother's sheep farm at Paarl, he left the Cape to try his luck on the Victorian gold fields, sailing to Australia in 1852. After a series of adventures and some success prospecting, an opportunity arose to secure a position in the newly reformed Victorian Mounted police. He was at the outset sent to Beechworth to oversee the gold escorts. During the next fifteen years he worked throughout the north-west and central goldfields and was instrumental in the capture of the bushranger Harry Power. By the end of the 1860s he reached the rank of Superintendent and was later promoted to the Richmond Barracks, (Melbourne) overseeing the Bourke District.

He led the hunt for the Kelly gang (Ned Kelly, Dan Kelly, Joe Byrne and Steve Hart) on two occasions in the late 1870s. He was to prove unsuccessful on his first attempt and had to retire from the chase following a fall from his horse. On his second attempt when he had been specifically requested by the colony's legislature to return, he met with the gang at Glenrowan in July 1880. During the ensuing shootout, he was severely wounded. The troopers went on to capture Ned Kelly and bring him to trial, whilst the other three members of the gang were killed.

After a Royal Commission into the Kelly affair, Hare resigned and was appointed a police magistrate, a position he held until his death. He was allocated the largest share of the reward for the capture of the Kelly gang.

== Origins ==
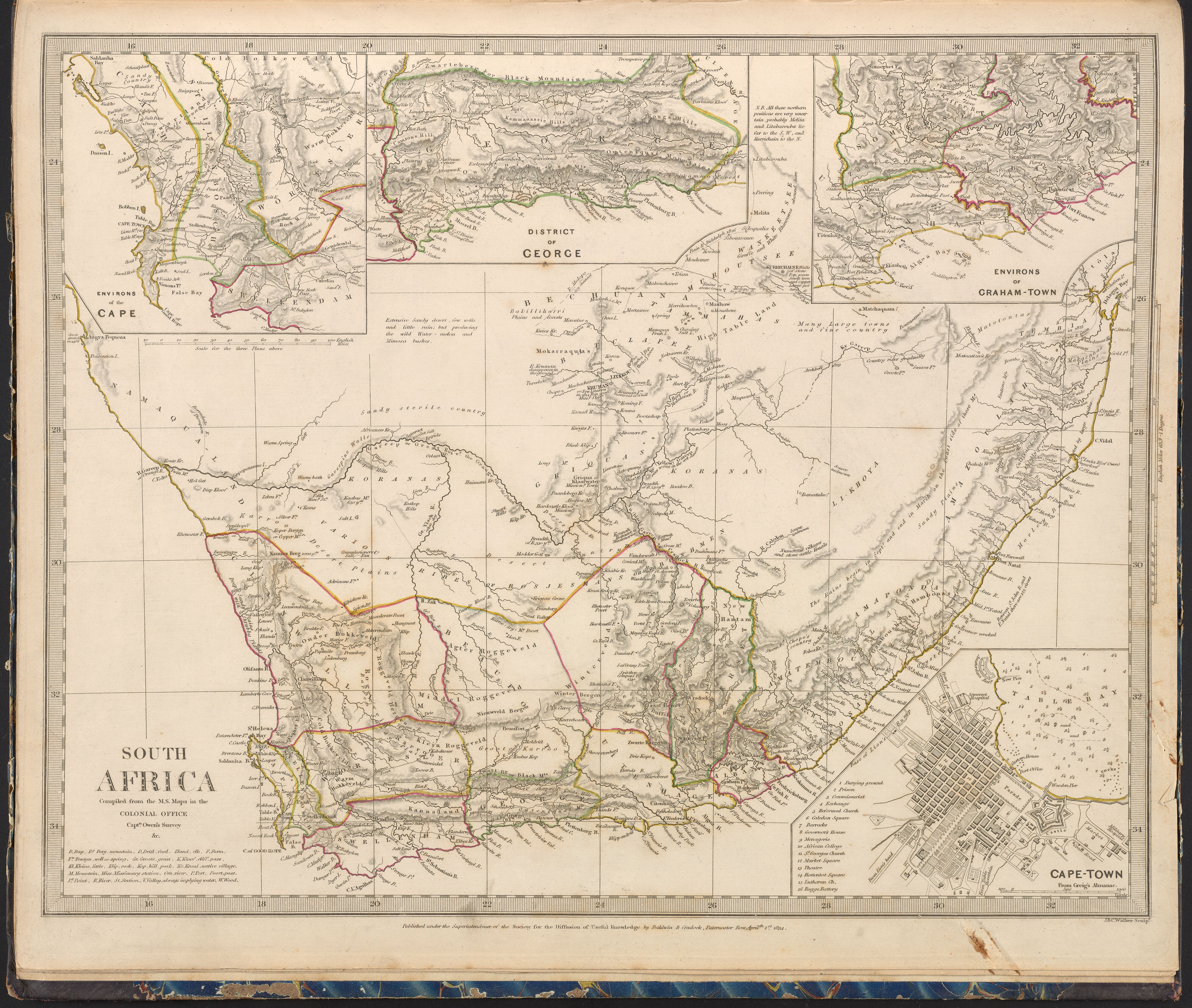
South Africa, 1834

Francis Augustus Hare was born at the Cape of Good Hope, in a little village called Wynberg, eight miles (13 km) from Capetown, on 4 October 1830, and was the youngest son of a family of sixteen or seventeen. His father, Joseph Hare (1772–1856), a captain in the 21st Dragoons, had settled in the Cape when the regiment was disbanded. His mother was Sally Wilberforce Bird (1793–1862). His early days were spent on the family farm at Wynberg, situated below the shadow of Table Mountain. He was among the first pupils at a school his father helped to set up, which remains one of South Africa's oldest schools still in existence, Wynberg Boys High.

== Prospecting ==
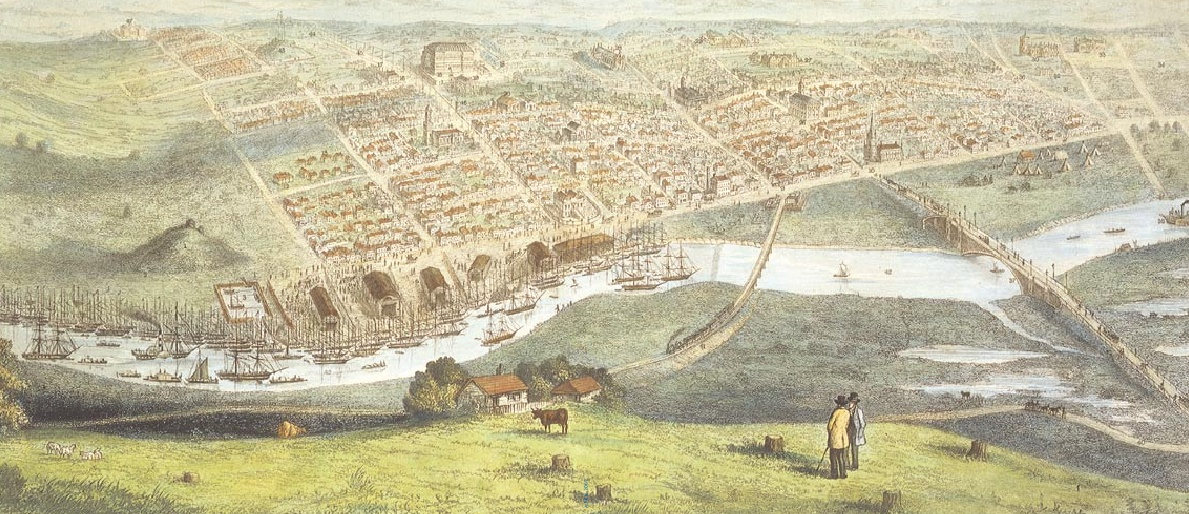
Sketch of Melbourne by Nathaniel Whittock from official surveys, and sketches taken in 1854 by G. Teale Esq^{r.}, printed 9 May 1855

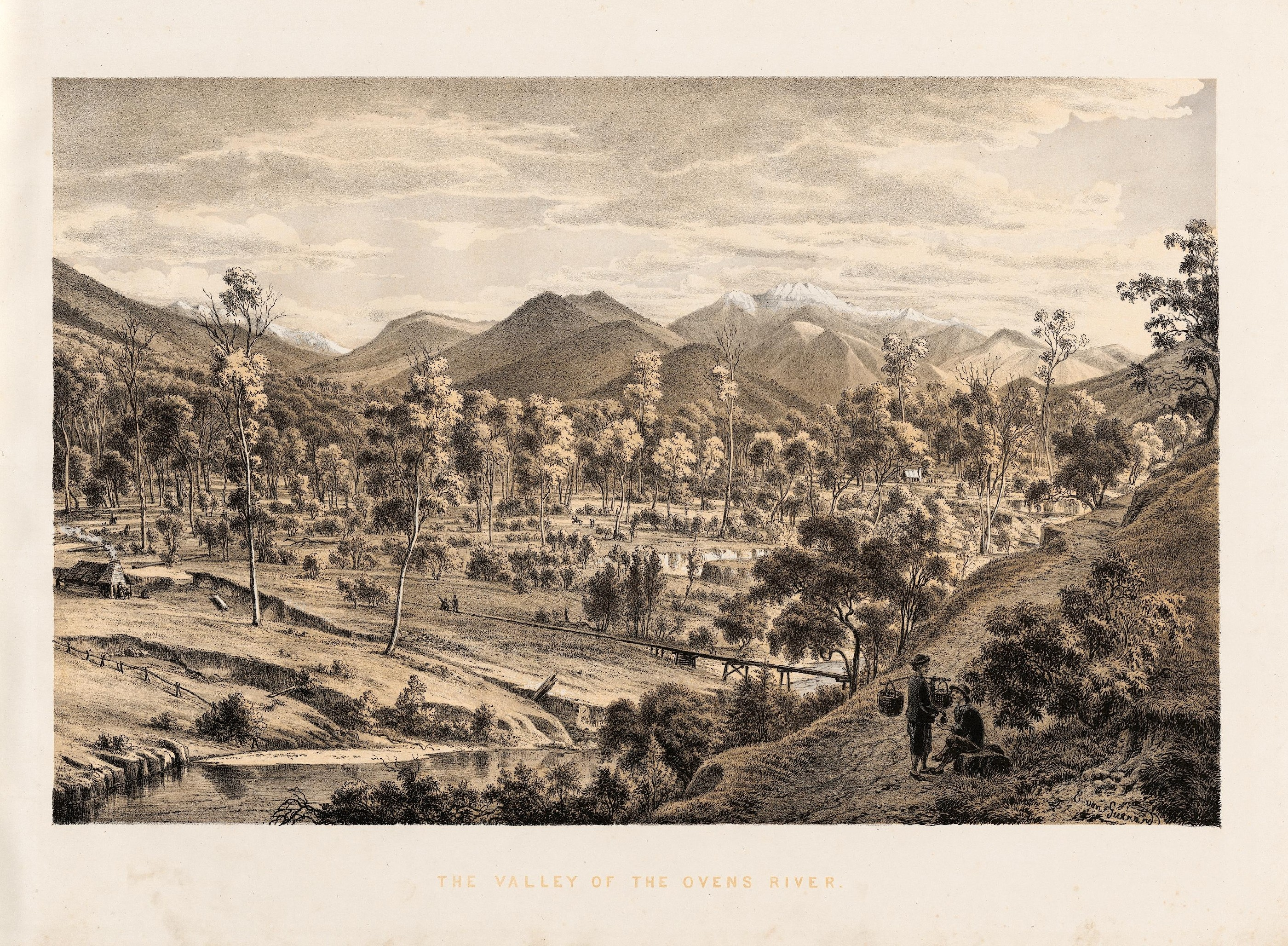
The Valley of the Ovens River, c. 1860s

After leaving high school he was for a time sheepfarming and with his brother, but the life was not congenial and he decided to go to Australia. He arrived in Melbourne on 10 April 1852, a few months after the gold discoveries. He paid a brief visit to Sydney, having a runaway convict from Norfolk Island as a mate, but returned at once to Melbourne, where there was much talk of gold and the diggings. Hare joined a party of visitors, and an eight days' tramp brought them to Bendigo, passing en route through the Black Forest, then a noted haunt of bushrangers. They pitched their tents at Golden Gully, and had a fair amount of luck as gold seekers. Alluring news came across from the Ovens and Hare and his party decided to go there, although on the day before he left Hare had himself washed out 10 ounces (280 grams) of gold in a little gully not far from their tents.

By Christmas Day, 1852, Hare was on celebrated Read's Creek "paddocking" for gold, and afterwards on Spring Creek, where his share of the proceeds of one claim was £800. He worked there for a time digging, or evading the digger's license in the same area he was to return as a lieutenant in the Mounted Police But a serious illness sent him to Sydney, with very little prospect of ever reaching it, and in his book, The Last of the Bushrangers, which contains the record of his life and adventures in Australia, Hare tells a story of his lying on top of a loaded dray beneath a gum-tree, with a crow perched just above him waiting for the end. The fear that his eyes would be torn out while he was yet alive seemed to give a stimulus, and from that point his illness turned and he recovered.

He afterwards went to the Waranga diggings with G. D. McCormick, who was born on the same day and year as Hare, and many years afterwards both were made police magistrates in the same year.

== Policing ==
Hare was desirous of joining the Victorian Mounted Police, and on 1 June 1854 he was appointed a lieutenant in the force by the then chief commissioner of police W. F. H. Mitchell. His first duty was in connection with gold escorts from Beechworth and Buckland, the country traversed being often so rough that on one occasion when a pack-mule laden with 2,000 ounces (57 kg) of gold broke away they were obliged to shoot it in order to recover the gold.

One of Hare's earliest achievements was the capture single-handed encounter with the bushranger Meakin at Dr. Mackay's station on the Ovens River in 1854. Meakin had come to the station, in search of a sum of £700 in cash paid to Dr. Mackay the day before for horses, and was unaware that Hare was at the station that night. Meakin was taken to Beechworth, tied with the same saddle straps he had brought to bind Dr. Mackay. Meakin made several attempts to regain his liberty, and escaping soon afterwards from the gaol at Kilmore was never again heard of. For several years Hare was on duty at the new rushes, such as Back Creek, Chinaman's Flat, and the notorious White Hill, near Maryborough, where murder was common. Hare was a tall man of some bulk and did not invite physical altercations although he once had a narrow escape from being shot at Back Creek by one of his own troopers.

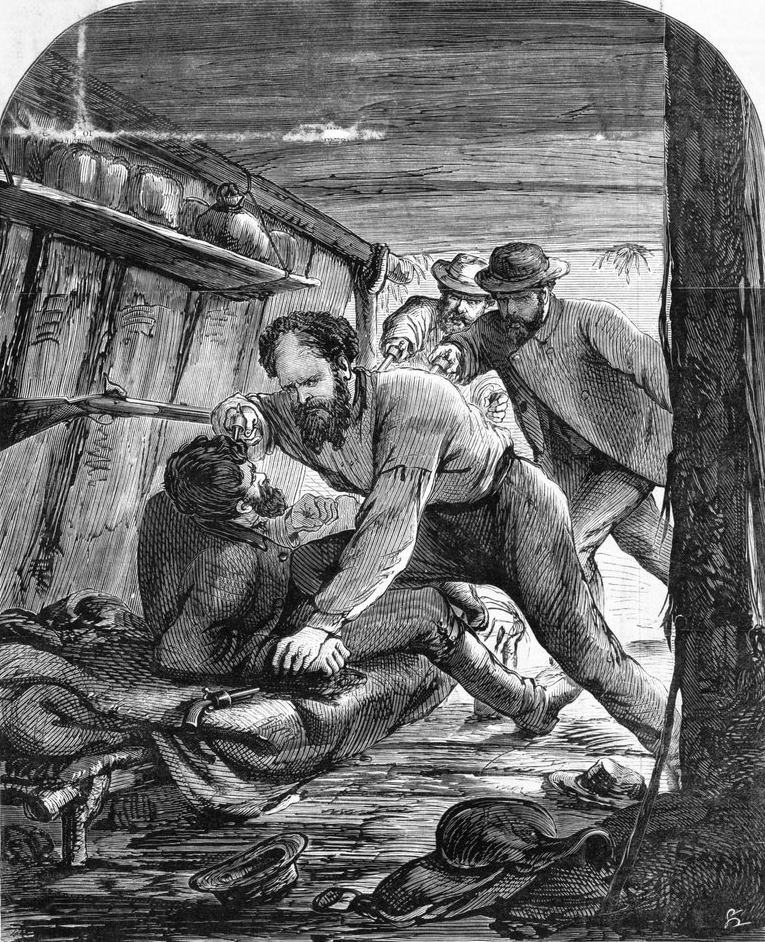
Capture of Power, June 1870

In his later years in the police force the more important episodes in Hare's experiences were the capture of Power, the bushranger, who, after surviving many vicissitudes and a long term of imprisonment, was accidentally drowned in the Lower Murray. Hare was one of the party which captured Power, the other members of the party being Inspector Montford and Donald, a local black tracker. With a promise of a reward of £500 they were able to secure the help of an associate of Power's, who led them to what was thought to be the safest of Power's retreats in the ranges. The only road to it was past the house of the Quinns, a known family and active friends of Power's. As the bushranger afterwards stated, one of his best sentinels was a peacock at Quinn's house, but on the night of the capture the police party got past without the peacock giving the alarm. At daybreak they came on Power's hut, which was at once rushed, the bushranger being asleep inside.

=== The hunt for the Kelly gang ===
Hare is most known in connection with the Kelly gang of bushrangers. They had been chiefly horse and cattle stealers, from childhood, but their outlawry commenced with the shooting of three mounted troopers at Stringybark in the Wonbat Ranges on 28 October 1878. From that time the pick of the Victorian police, aided by six Queensland trackers, were in pursuit of them; but with the help of friends and relations and a thorough knowledge of the vast surrounding bush they managed to evade capture for two years, and provide themselves with funds from two bank robberies.

Hare was given the command in the Kelly country after the successful raid upon the Euroa Bank. One of his first acts was to seek an interview with Aaron Sherritt who, like Ned Kelly and Joe Byrne, was an able bushman, a known sympathiser with the outlaws, and a participator in some of their earlier horse-stealing raids. Hare in his book tells how Mrs. Byrne, the mother of one of the bushrangers, found her way one day into a police camp and recognised Aaron Sherritt as he lay asleep. Sheritt learning this when he awoke turned deadly pale and said "Now, I am a dead man". Sherritt's connection with Hare was so little known that he was once fired on by the police, and on another occasion arrested for horse stealing.

On 26 June, some considerable time afterwards, and just after Hare had for a second time been given the command of the Kelly Hunt, Aaron Sheritt was called out of his hut one night and shot dead by his former schoolfellow, Joe Byrne. Working on the premis that upon news of this murder a special train would be sent to Beechworth with police and trackers, Ned Kelly and Hart had ridden to Glenrowan and, taking possession of the town, tore up the line in order to wreck the special police train.

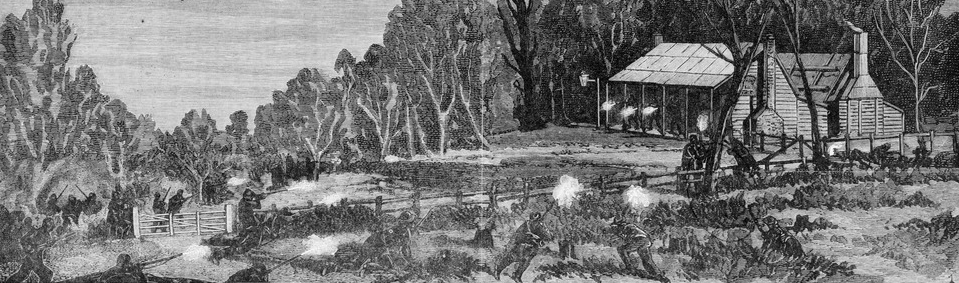
The gang and police exchange gunfire. Drawing by Tom Carrington, one of several journalists present during the fight

The story of the stopping of the special and the final struggle with the outlaws at Glenrowan is well known: Hare led the rush of policemen on Jones's Hotel at Glenrowan, but was shot through the wrist and disabled on the first volley. He directed the attack for some time, but faint from loss of blood, had to leave for Benalla.

==== Aftermath ====
Kelly was hanged at Melbourne gaol on 11 November. Hare later recalled, "The coroner who held the inquest on Ned Kelly told me he seldom saw a man show so little pluck, and if it had not been for his priest, who kept him up, he would not have been able to walk to the gallows."

Hare received the congratulations both the Governor and the Chief Secretary for his work on the Kelly case. However, a great deal of dissension amongst the police force followed, and after a Royal Commission into the Kelly affair, Hare retired from office and was made a police magistrate in 1882, a position which he held till death.

== Melbourne life ==
A keen follower of Melbourne's sporting events,—in particular cricket,—Hare was present at the party where the stumps were burned following a friendly match between the English and Australian teams. The Ashes were presented to the captain of the winning team, Ivor Bligh and returned with him to England. They are now permanently held in the MCC museum at Lord's Cricket Ground. As a confident of the Police Commissioner Fredrick Standish, the man who instigated the Melbourne Cup, Hare was a keen supporter of horse racing and also owned his own coursing dogs.

=== Death ===
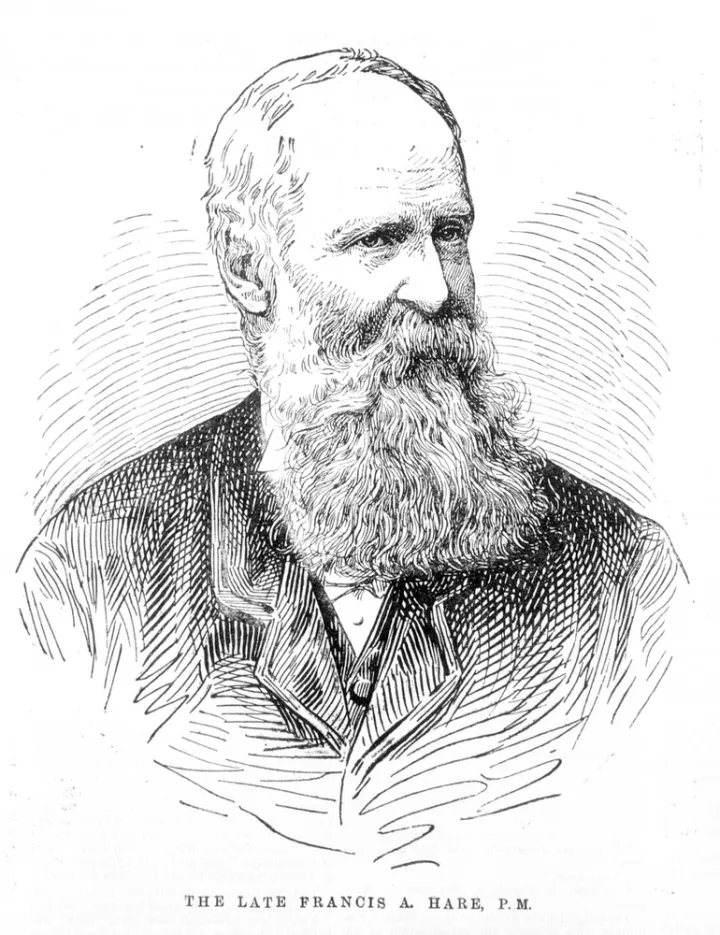
Francis A. Hare, P.M.

Francis Augustus Hare died on 9 July 1892, aged sixty-one years, from complications of diabetes. He had been discharged earlier from a Melbourne hospital and died at Rupertswood, the country home of Sir William Clarke. Hare is buried at Melbourne cemetery, Carlton. According to press reports of the time, a large number of people gathered along the route of the funeral procession and a great many friends, family and senior officials were at the graveside. His obituary in the Argus noted, "While his discretion in connection with the pursuit of the Kelly gang was matter for comment, his personal courage was never once doubted."

== Personal life ==
He married Janet Snodgrass, the sister of the Peter Snodgrass MLC, an early reformer of the police force in the newly established colony of Victoria; and aunt to Lady Janet Clarke (née Snodgrass), who was married to the well known philanthropist and entrepreneur Sir William Clarke. Hare had no children.

== Depictions in popular culture ==
He was played by Charles Webb in 1951 film The Glenrowan Affair.

He appears in the musical Ned Kelly: The Electric Music Show. On the musical's concept album, he is depicted as "Sergeant Hare", and voiced by the musical's librettist Reg Livermore. In the original stage production that performed at the Adelaide Festival Centre in 1977, he was played by Arthur Dignam. In the 2026 revival produced by Victorian Opera, he was played by Robert Grubb.

He was played by Anthony Hawkins in the 1980 miniseries The Last Outlaw.

He was played by Geoffrey Rush in the 2003 film Ned Kelly.

He appears in NED – A New Australian Musical. In the original production, staged at the Bendigo's Ulumbarra Theatre in 2015, he was played by Andrew Broadbent. The production staged at Sydney's New Theatre in 2018 he was played by Marcus Riviera.

== Works ==
Hare published his own autobiography, first as a series of articles in the Leader newspapers, then in book form: The Last of the Bushrangers: An Account of the Capture of the Kelly Gang (1892).

== Sources ==
- Clarke, Michael (1995). Clarke of Rupertswood, 1831–1897: The Life and Times of William John Clarke, First Baronet of Rupertswood. Collingwood: Australian Scholarly Publishing. ISBN 9781875606238.
- Haldane, Robert (1991). The People's Force: A History of the Victoria Police. Melbourne: Melbourne University Publishing.
- Hare, F. A. (1894). The Last of the Bushrangers: An Account of the Capture of the Kelly Gang (3rd ed.). London: Hurst and Blackett, Ltd.
- Phelan, Aidan (2020). Glenrowan. Melbourne: Australian Bushranging. ISBN 9780646821702.
- "Death of Mr Hare P.M.". The Leader. 19 July 1892. p. 33.
- Police Commission. Minutes of Evidence taken before Royal Commission on the Police Force of Victoria together with Appendices. Melbourne: John Ferres, Government Printer. 1881.
- Report of the board appointed to enquire into and report on the proper mode of distributing rewards offered for the capture of the Kelly gang together with the minutes of evidence. Parliamentary Papers (Kelly Reward Board). Melbourne: R.S. Brain, Acting Govt. printer. 1882.

Attribution:

- "Death of Mr. Hare, P.M." The Argus. 11 July 1892. p. 7.
