= Armour of the Kelly gang =

Homemade armour used by Ned Kelly and his associates

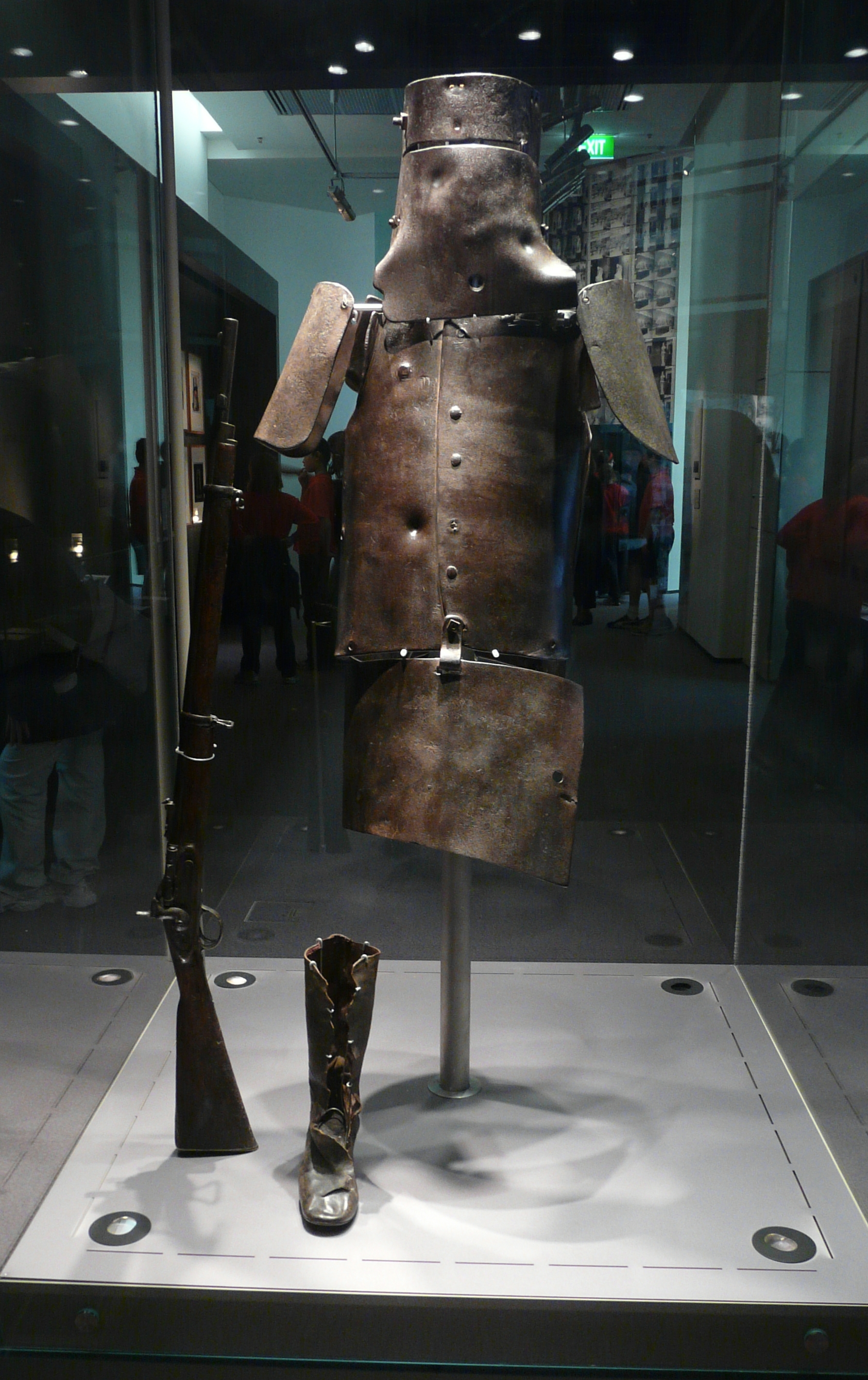
Ned Kelly's armour on display in the State Library of Victoria. The helmet, breastplate, backplate and shoulder plates show 18 bullet marks. Also on display are Kelly's Snider Enfield and one of his boots.

In 1879, Australian bushranger and outlaw Ned Kelly devised a plan to create bulletproof armour and wear it during shootouts with the police. He and other members of the Kelly gang—Joe Byrne, Steve Hart, and brother Dan Kelly—had their own armour suits and helmets crafted from plough mouldboards, either donated by sympathisers or stolen from farms. The boards were heated and then beaten into shape over the course of four to five months, most likely in a crude bush forge and possibly with the assistance of blacksmiths. While the suits successfully repelled bullets, their heavy weight made them cumbersome to wear, and the gang debated their utility.

The gang found use for the armour as part of a plan to derail and ambush a police train in June 1880 at Glenrowan. After the plan failed, the gang, having taken hostages in a local hotel, wore the armour during a final shootout with the police. Byrne died from a stray bullet that hit his groin through a small gap in the armour, and in an attempt to rescue Dan and Hart, Ned donned his suit during a fifteen-minute exchange of gunfire with the police. Although the armour protected his head and torso, he received several bullet wounds to the hands and legs, causing significant blood loss and resulting in his capture. Hart and Dan died during the final stages of the siege, possibly in a suicide pact. After making sufficient recovery from his wounds, Ned was tried, convicted, and sentenced to death by hanging.

News reports of the armour caused a sensation throughout Australia and much of the world. It has become a widely recognisable image and icon, inspiring many cultural depictions and cementing Ned Kelly as one of Australia's most well-known historical figures. The suits of armour ended up in both private and public hands; Ned Kelly's, for instance, is held by the State Library of Victoria. However, within days of the Kelly gang's demise, the armour started to become mismatched, and there was confusion over which pieces belonged to which suit. It was not until 2002, after extensive research, that owners reached an agreement to swap the necessary pieces to restore the original suits.

== Inspiration ==
There are two main theories for the inspiration for the armour. One is that members of the gang had witnessed performers wearing Chinese armour during a carnival procession through the streets of Beechworth in 1873. The gang also had a network of Chinese sympathisers, and Byrne, who grew up near Chinese camps on the goldfields, was reported to have been fluent in Cantonese. The other theory is that Ned got the idea from his favourite book, R. D. Blackmore's Lorna Doone (1869). Set in 17th-century England, the novel is about a family of outlaws, and in one part describes them on horseback wearing "iron plates on breast and head". Another story is that Ned saw and drew a suit of armour during a visit to the Melbourne Museum. What is widely accepted is that the idea and decision to wear armour was Ned's.

== Design ==
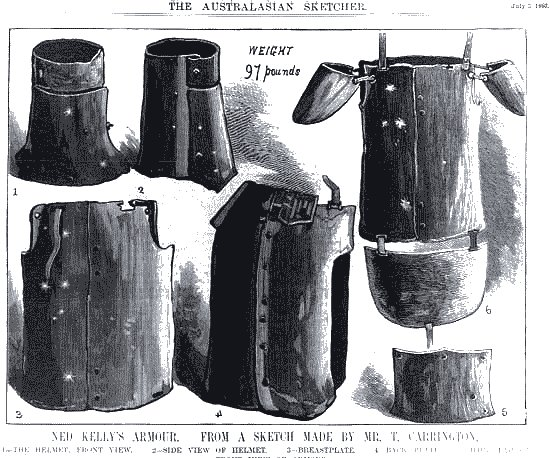
An 1880 illustration showing Ned Kelly's helmet and armour suit complete with an apron and shoulder plates

The gang's armour was made of iron six millimetres (0.24 in) thick, each consisting of a long breast-plate, shoulder-plates, back-guard, apron and helmet. The helmet resembled a tin can without a crown, and included a long slit for the eyes. The suits' separate parts were strapped together on the body while the helmet was separate with internal leather straps that straddled the head, keeping the massive weight off of the collar bones and the shoulders, also allowing it to be removed easily. Ned Kelly's armour weighed 44 kilograms (97 lb). His suit was the only one to have an apron at the back, but all four had front aprons. Padding is only known from Ned's armour and it is not clear if the other suits were similarly padded. Ned wore a padded skull cap and his helmet also had internal strapping so that his head could take some of the weight. After the shootout there were five bullet marks on the helmet, three on the breast-plate, nine on the back-plate, and one on the shoulder-plate.

== Manufacturing the armour ==
The manufacture of the four suits took four or five months. Two stolen circular saws and iron tacks were tried and found not to be bulletproof. Mouldboards for plough shares were ultimately adopted. It was likely that the first suit made was defective, and was therefore discarded.

According to legend, the armour was made on a stringybark log by the gang themselves. Due to the quality of the workmanship and the difficulties involved in forging, historians and blacksmiths originally believed the armour could only have been made by a professional blacksmith in a forge. A professional blacksmith would have heated the steel to over 1,000 °C (1,830 °F) before shaping it. A bush forge could only reach 750 °C (1,380 °F), which would make shaping the metal very difficult. In 2005, Byrne's suit of armour was disassembled and tested by ANSTO at the Lucas Heights nuclear reactor in Sydney to determine how the armour was made and what temperatures were involved. The results indicated that the heating of the metal was "patchy". Some parts had been bent cold while other parts had been subjected to extended periods in a heat source of not much more than 700 °C (1,292 °F), which is consistent with the bush forge theory. The quality of forging was also determined to be less than believed, and it was considered unlikely to have been done by a blacksmith. The bush forge theory is now widely accepted. After heating, the mould boards were likely beaten straight over a green log before being cut into shape and riveted together to form each individual piece.

The Hobart Mercury reported that Glenrowan district blacksmith Joe Grigg had made the armour from parts of ploughs and harvesting machines while watched by Ned and Dan Kelly. Ned paid for Grigg's work in gold sovereigns. Grigg immediately told the authorities about it and was told to keep the cash, as he had earned it honestly. This information did not become known until Grigg's death in 1934, as authorities apparently did not want details known to the public, and, apart from its mention in Grigg's 1934 obituary, the story remained relatively unknown.

== Use in the Glenrowan shootout ==
"Our feelings may be easier imagined than described, for it seemed we were fighting with a supernatural being."

— Constable Arthur, one of the policemen who exchanged gunfire with an armoured Ned Kelly at Glenrowan

During Kelly's last stand, in the mist and dim light of dawn, the size and outline of his armour made a number of policemen question whether he was even human, and his apparent invulnerability caused onlookers to react with "superstitious awe". Journalists at the scene described him as "a strange apparition" and "a fiend with a charmed life". Constable Arthur, the first policeman to encounter Kelly, recalled that he was initially "completely astonished, and could not understand what the object [he] was firing at was"; as the shootout continued he thought Kelly was a "huge blackfellow wrapped in a blanket". After firing five point-blank shots at the advancing figure, civilian volunteer Dowsett cried out that it was the Devil, to which Constable Kelly (no relation to Ned Kelly) replied, "No, it must be the bunyip".

== Aftermath and ownership ==
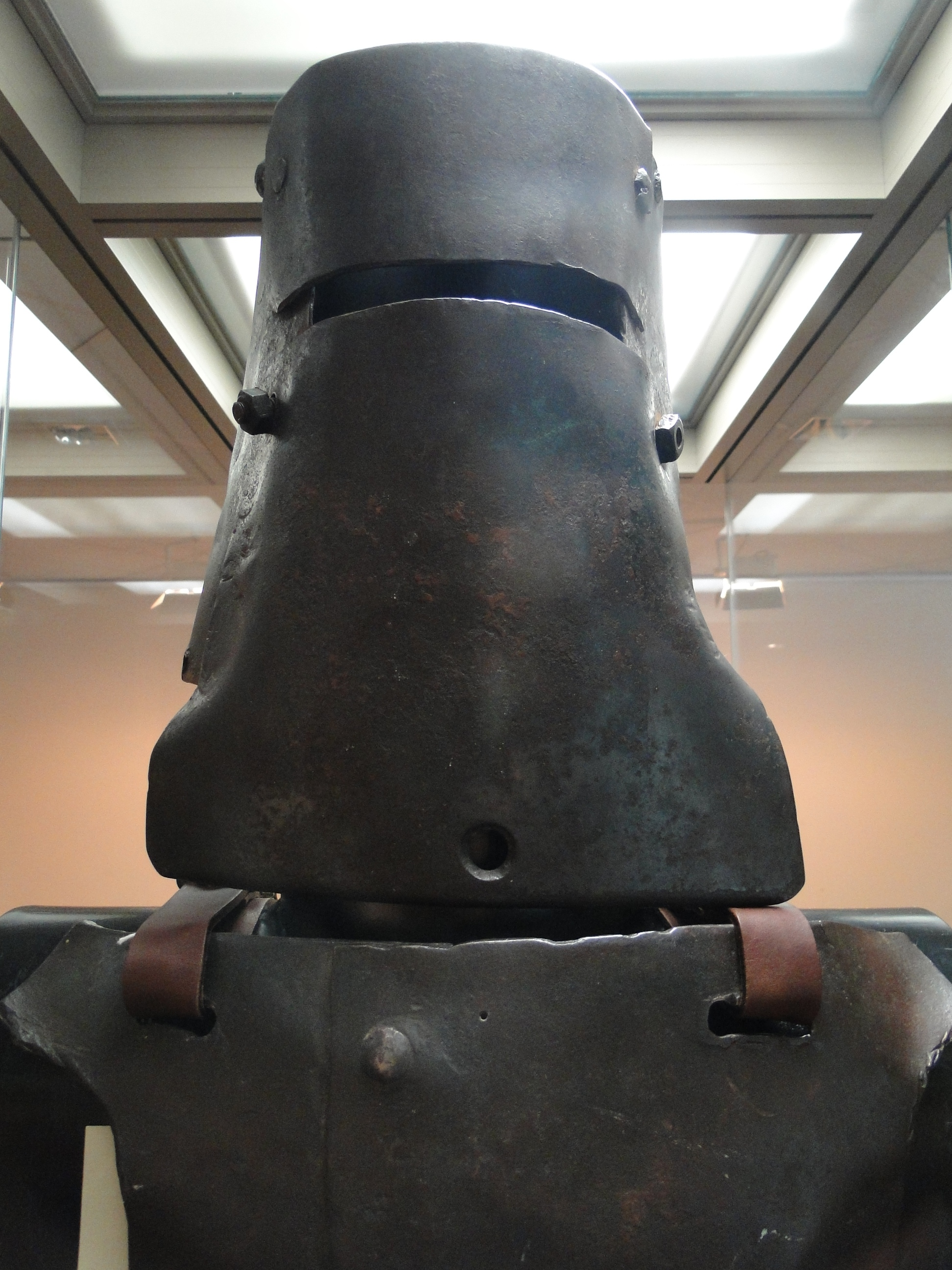
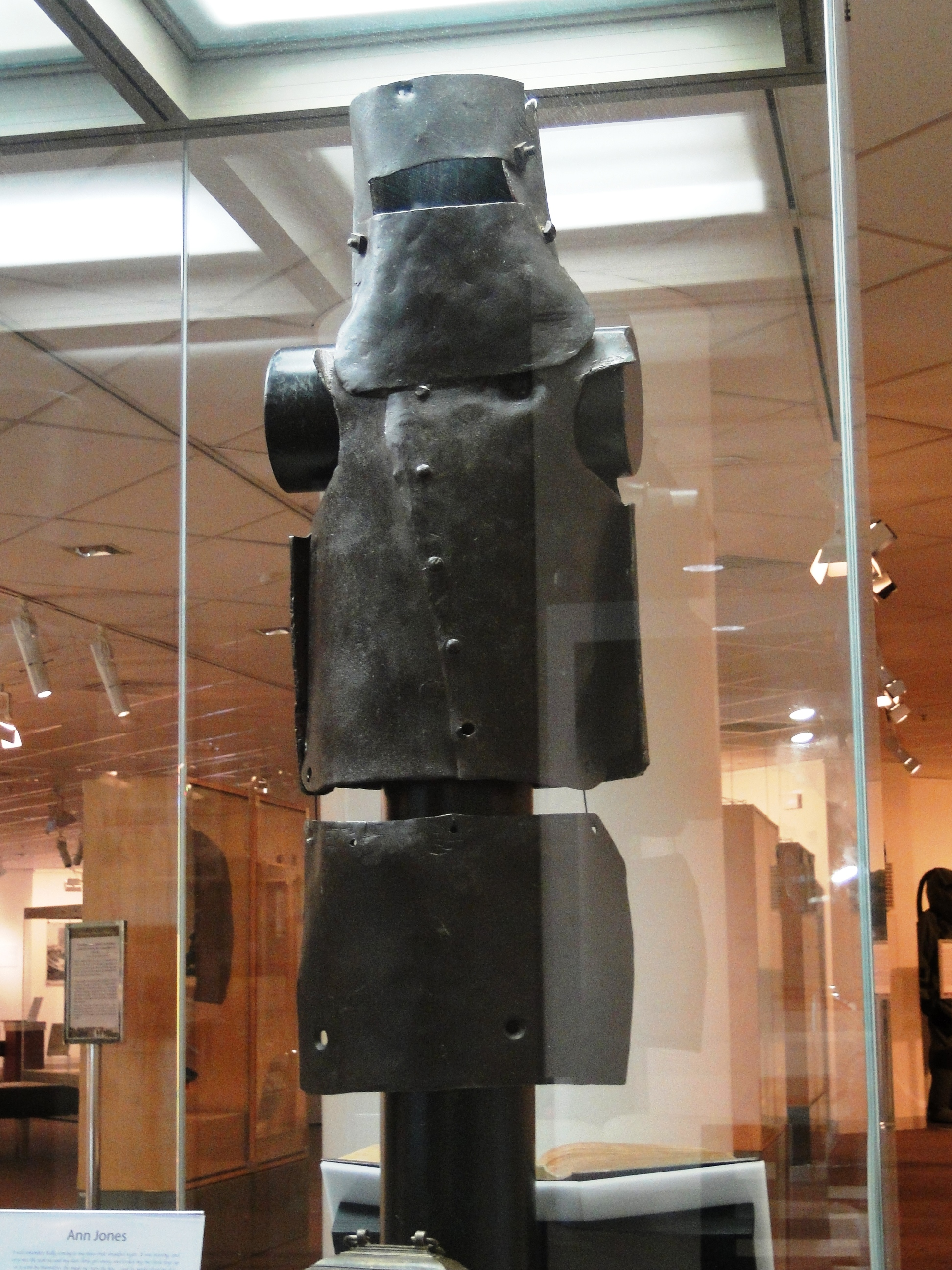
Dan Kelly's armour (left) and Steve Hart's armour (right), on display in the Victoria Police Museum.

Following the siege of Glenrowan, the news media reported the events and use of armour around the world. The gang were admired in military circles, and Arthur Conan Doyle commented on the gang's imagination and recommended similar armour for use by British infantry. The police announcement to the Australian public that the armour was made from ploughshares was ridiculed, disputed, and deemed impossible even by blacksmiths.

There was considerable debate over whether to destroy the armour, but all four disassembled suits were eventually stored in Melbourne. Francis Augustus Hare gave Ned Kelly's armour to Sir William Clarke, and it was later donated to the State Library of Victoria (SLV). Byrne's was kept by Hare and now belongs to the latter's descendants. Dan Kelly and Hart's are still owned by Victoria Police. As no effort was made to maintain the armour's integrity while stored, the suits were reassembled by guesswork. In 2002, several parts were identified from photographs taken shortly after the siege and reunited with their original suits. The SLV was able to exchange Hart's breastplate for Ned Kelly's, making Kelly's suit currently the most original. In January 2002, all four suits were displayed together for an exhibition in the Old Melbourne Gaol.
