= Jerilderie Letter =

Letter dictated by Australian bushranger and outlaw Ned Kelly

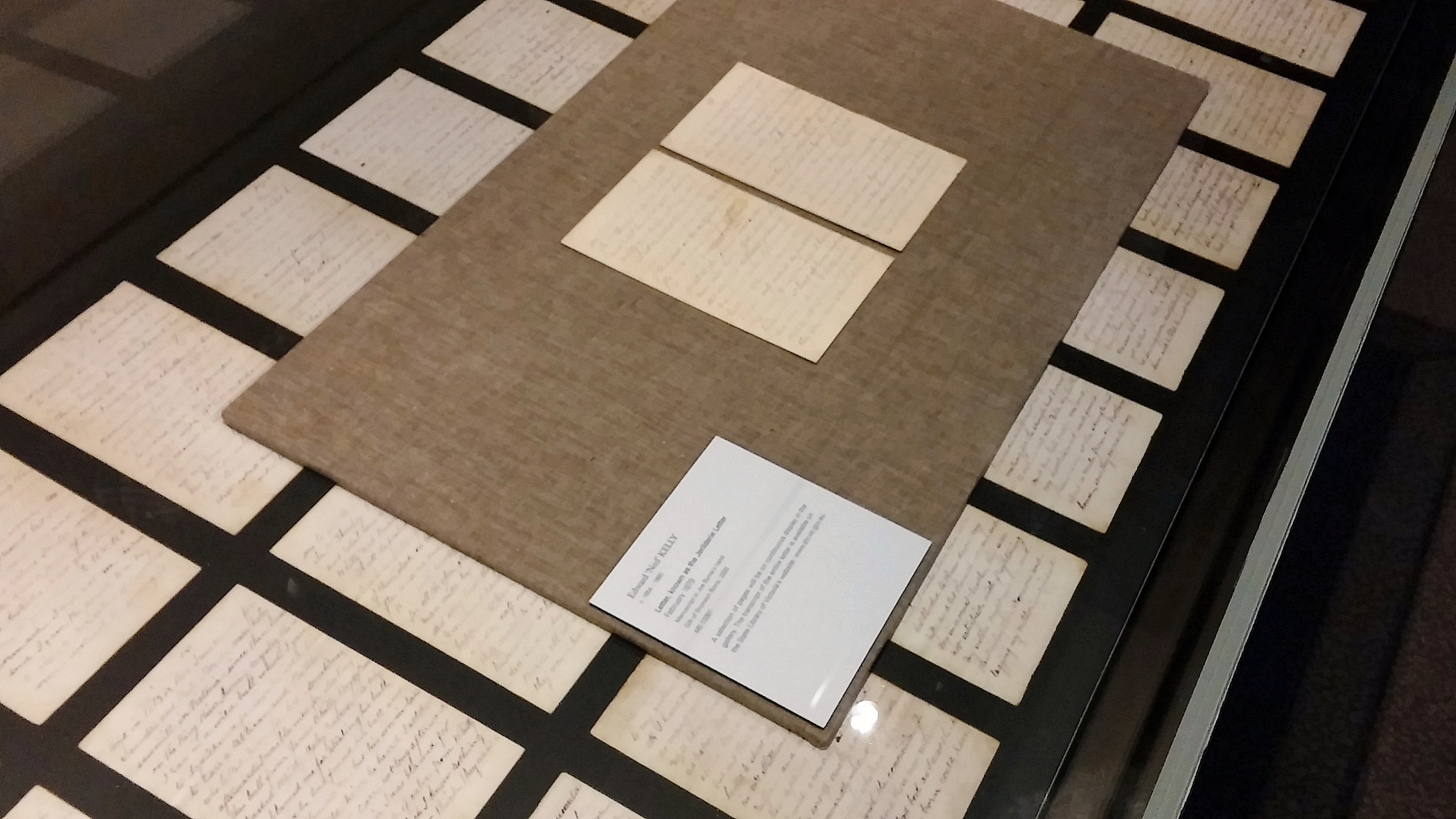
Some of the 56 pages comprising the Jerilderie Letter, on display at the State Library Victoria

The Jerilderie Letter is a handwritten document composed by Australian bushranger and outlaw Ned Kelly in 1879. Described as "part autobiography, part manifesto", it is traditionally understood to have been dictated by Kelly to fellow gang member Joe Byrne, who may also have contributed to its composition. The letter is named after the town of Jerilderie, New South Wales, where the Kelly gang carried out an armed bank robbery in February 1879 and where Kelly tried to have the document published as a pamphlet.

The letter comprises 56 pages and roughly 7,400 words. In it, Kelly traces his path to outlawry and justifies his actions, including the killings of three policemen at Stringybark Creek in October 1878, which he portrays as an act of self-defence. Expressing hostility towards the police throughout the letter, Kelly alleges corruption, perjury and mistreatment of his family and other poor rural settlers in north-eastern Victoria, while also attacking wealthy landholders, the Victorian Government and the colonial justice system. The letter contains broader political and sectarian themes, including anti-English sentiments and a critique of British rule, drawing on Irish nationalist grievances and the Australian convict tradition of resistance. The letter concludes with calls for fairer treatment of the poor, alongside threats of widespread further violence against police, informants and civilians who assist or harbour them.

One of only two original Kelly letters known to have survived, it is a longer and more detailed version of the Cameron Letter, copies of which Kelly sent to a Victorian parliamentarian and the police following the gang's raid on Euroa, Victoria, in December 1878. Two copies were made of the Jerilderie Letter during Kelly's lifetime, one by publican John Hanlon and one by a government clerk. Due to political suppression, only summaries of its contents were published in the press; it was not published in full until 1930. Since then, the letter has been appraised as a significant work of Australian literature, with scholars noting its distinctive vernacular, rhetorical and poetic qualities. Its influence has extended into the arts, notably informing painter Sidney Nolan's 1946–47 Ned Kelly series and author Peter Carey's Booker Prize-winning novel True History of the Kelly Gang (2000). The original letter is held at the State Library Victoria in Melbourne.

== History ==
=== Background ===
Edward Kelly was born in the Colony of Victoria, Australia, around 1854 to Irish-born parents, John, a transported convict, and Ellen (née Quinn). The Kellys lived on selections (small farms) in north-eastern Victoria, where they struggled financially and formed part of a large extended family, several members of which were involved in livestock theft. Kelly received little formal education and became familiar with the bush from an early age.

Kelly first became involved in bushranging in 1869, aged about 14, as an associate of Harry Power. He was subsequently imprisoned for offences including assault and receiving a stolen horse and became increasingly hostile towards the police. By 1877, he was associated with the "Greta Mob" of bush larrikins, which included his younger brother Dan, Joe Byrne and Steve Hart.

In April 1878, a violent confrontation occurred at the Kelly home in Greta when Constable Alexander Fitzpatrick attempted to arrest Dan Kelly. Fitzpatrick claimed that Ned shot and wounded him, and Ellen Kelly and two others were later convicted of aiding and abetting attempted murder. Ned and Dan fled into remote bushland in the Wombat Ranges, where they were joined by Byrne and Hart.

On 26 October 1878, the gang engaged four policemen in a gunfight at Stringybark Creek. Three policemen—Thomas Lonigan, Michael Scanlan and Sergeant Michael Kennedy—were killed, while Thomas McIntyre escaped. Kelly later claimed the killings were acts of self-defence, while McIntyre gave a conflicting account.

The killings prompted the Victorian Government to pass the Felons Apprehension Act 1878, under which the gang were declared outlaws on 15 November. The Act authorised their killing if encountered armed or reasonably suspected of being armed, and imposed severe penalties on those who aided them. A substantial reward was offered for their capture, dead or alive.

==== Cameron Letter ====
On 14 November 1878, the day before Kelly and his gang were outlawed, Victorian parliamentarian Donald Cameron, speaking in the Legislative Assembly, referred to statements suggesting that the "conduct of certain members of the police force" may have "led up" to the Stringybark Creek killings, and asked the premier, Graham Berry, to inquire into the origins of the Kelly outbreak and the actions of the police authorities. It is speculated that Kelly and Byrne read about this exchange in the newspapers and may have mistaken Cameron as sympathetic to the gang. Kelly dictated a long letter to Byrne with the intention of sending it to Cameron.

On 9 December 1878, the gang robbed the bank in Euroa, Victoria, after taking hostages at a pastoral station nearby. Byrne kept watch over the hostages at the station while the rest of the gang carried out the robbery, and some of the hostages recalled seeing Byrne writing copies of a long letter.

Shortly after the Euroa robbery, Cameron and Police Superintendent John Sadleir each received a copy of Kelly's letter, signed "Edward Kelly, enforced outlaw", in which Kelly sought to justify his actions, portray himself and his family as victims of police persecution and explain the Stringybark Creek killings as acts of self-defence. Berry advised against releasing the letter to the press for publication, but reporters were permitted to read it and publish summaries. Newspaper accounts of the letter ranged from dismissive to sympathetic, with The Argus describing the author as "a clever illiterate person".

=== Jerilderie raid ===
Following the suppression of the Cameron Letter, Kelly composed a longer, more detailed version of it sometime before the gang's raid on the town of Jerilderie in southern New South Wales from 8 to 10 February 1879. It is traditionally thought that Kelly dictated the letter to Byrne, or that Kelly created a draft which Byrne then rewrote in neater handwriting.

Kelly took the letter to Jerilderie intending to have it published as a pamphlet for public distribution. After robbing the local branch of the Bank of New South Wales, Kelly sought out Samuel Gill, editor of the Jerilderie Herald and Urana Gazette, to arrange its printing. However, Gill had fled the town after learning of the gang's arrival. Kelly subsequently gave the letter to bank accountant Edwin Living, and demanded that he pass it onto Gill, warning, "Mind you get it printed, or you'll have me to reckon with next time we meet".

Living ignored Kelly's demands and, after the gang departed Jerilderie, set off on horseback with the document towards Deniliquin, New South Wales, 50 miles away, from where he planned to catch a train to Melbourne. J. W. Tarleton, the bank's manager, accompanied Living to Deniliquin. When they stopped to rest at John Hanlon's hotel eight miles from Deniliquin, Living allowed Hanlon to read Kelly's document and make a copy of it. Hanlon gave his copy the heading "Ned Kelly's Confession". The following morning Living and Tarleton took the train to Melbourne where they delivered Kelly's letter to the office of the Bank of New South Wales, who then forward it to the police.

=== Suppression ===
As with the Cameron letter, the authorities advised against making the letter available to the public, and only summaries and small excerpts of the letter were published during Kelly's lifetime. Jerilderie schoolteacher William Elliott read the document and gave a synopsis to Samuel Gill, who telegraphed it to Melbourne. The Melbourne Age published the synopsis on 18 February 1879. Four days later, Gill published the synopsis in his newspaper. Newspapers across Australia soon reprinted the synopsis; the Melbourne correspondent for the The South Australian Advertiser noted in an editorial comment:

There is a boastful intemperate tone throughout the letter ... There is much in Kelly's letter unsuitable for publication, and it will consequently be withheld.

The letter's suppression, ordered by Chief Secretary Robert Ramsay, was motivated in part by fears that Kelly's own account would "palliate" his crimes and garner him public sympathy. The Argus defended Ramsay's order, arguing that printing "stories from Kelly's own lips" would encourage the tendency to regard him as a modern Robin Hood and give him an opportunity to malign the police while presenting himself as a hero and martyr.

On 13 November 1880, two days after Kelly's execution, The Leader in Melbourne published several longer passages of the letter. Introducing it as Kelly's "autobiography", the newspaper noted that because Kelly had been executed, the time had "now passed when evil results can follow from its publication".

Recalling the letter and its political suppression, William Elliott wrote in 1914:

The Victorian Government ... came in for its share of vituperation and abuse ... Kelly called upon all and sundry to be up and resist, and hound down the scoundrels and wipe them off the face of the earth, ... Kelly was undoubtedly ambitious, and would seemingly have liked to have been at the head of a hundred followers or so to upset the existing government or bring them to terms. With his ambition there must also have been a lot of the Don Quixote about him.

=== The Herald Letter ===
Textual comparisons between Kelly's letters

Cameron Letter

Had I robbed, plundered, ravished & murdered everything I met my character could not be painted blacker than it is at present but thank God my conscience is as clear as the snow in Peru.

Jerilderie Letter

In every paper that is printed I am called the blackest and coldest blooded murderer ever on record. ... If I had robbed and plundered ravished and murdered everything I met young and old rich and poor. the public could not do any more than take firearms and Assisting the police as they have done, but by the light that shines pegged on an ant-bed with their bellies opened their fat taken out rendered and poured down their throat boiling hot will be cool to what pleasure I will give some of them and any person aiding or harbouring or assisting the Police.

The Herald Letter

At present [the outlaws] are painted as black as print can paint them, but they harmed no man, woman, or child. Their actions are more like those of four sisters of charity than four outlaws. If they had robbed, and plundered, and ravished and murdered the public and every man and woman they met, it would have been a different thing, but in the way they have acted, after being treated as they have been, they deserve to be called men instead of outlaws.

In July 1879, The Herald published extracts from an anonymous 16-page letter that is regarded by historians as a further attempt by Kelly to bring his grievances before the public and to justify the gang's conflict with police. Addressed to the newspaper's editor, the letter was described by The Herald as coming from a correspondent who was evidently a sympathiser and close associate of the gang, and who might himself have been a member. The newspaper characterised the document as rambling and poorly written, and noted that its published extracts had been altered to make them intelligible rather than reproduced verbatim.

Although the original letter has not survived, its attribution to Kelly is supported by the extracts, which contain identical phrasing to the Cameron and Jerilderie letters, as well as apparent insider knowledge. The letter also repeats many of the same arguments found in Kelly's earlier letters, particularly allegations of police misconduct and the persecution of his family and associates.

== Composition ==
=== Format and style ===
What would people say if I became a policeman and took an oath to arrest my brothers and sisters & relations and convict them by fair or foul means after the conviction of my mother and the persecutions and insults offered to myself and people Would they say I was a decent gentleman, and yet a police-man is still in worse and guilty of meaner actions than that The Queen must surely be proud of such heroic men as the Police and Irish soldiers as It takes eight or eleven of the biggest mud crushers in Melbourne to take one poor little half starved larrakin to a watch house. I have seen as many as eleven, big & ugly enough to lift Mount Macedon out of a crab hole more like the species of a baboon or Guerilla than a man.

— Excerpt from the original Jerilderie Letter, preserving its punctuation, spelling and grammar

The original manuscript of the Jerilderie Letter is 56 pages long and contains approximately 7,400 words. Written in the first person on notepaper measuring 20.3 x 12.5 cm, its script is clear and careful, suggesting that it was intended as a fair copy rather than a spontaneous first draft. Its style, however, is much less conventional, featuring minimal and irregular punctuation, almost no paragraphing, numerous grammatical inconsistencies, and frequent shifts in subject, resulting in what has been called a "stream of conscious outpouring". The letter can be baffling to readers without explanatory notes; for example, Kelly names 68 different people in total, many of whom are introduced with "little notion of how much assistance readers will need to understand the associative connections" between them. Despite these qualities, the letter contains relatively few spelling errors.

In assessing the letter's prose, scholars have noted its distinctive rhythms and strongly oral character. Germaine Greer argues that it should be read aloud to find its "breath" and "heartbeat", noting how it "gradually builds up to break-neck speed", with "pauses, and leaps, and wild swerves of tone", evocative of blank verse. Describing the letter as an "apocalyptic chant", Alex McDermott argues that it anticipates the modernist ambition to make "the written and spoken words indivisible", as seen in the 20th-century work of Irish writer James Joyce. Dymphna Lonergan identifies features of the Irish oral storytelling tradition, including repetition, hyperbole, simile and metaphor. Bruce Johnson compares Kelly's "exploitation of sonic effects such as alliteration and assonance" to that of "a hell-and-damnation preacher". The letter consequently retains something of the immediacy and spontaneity of a dramatic monologue, qualities particularly pronounced when read aloud.

=== Questions of authorship ===
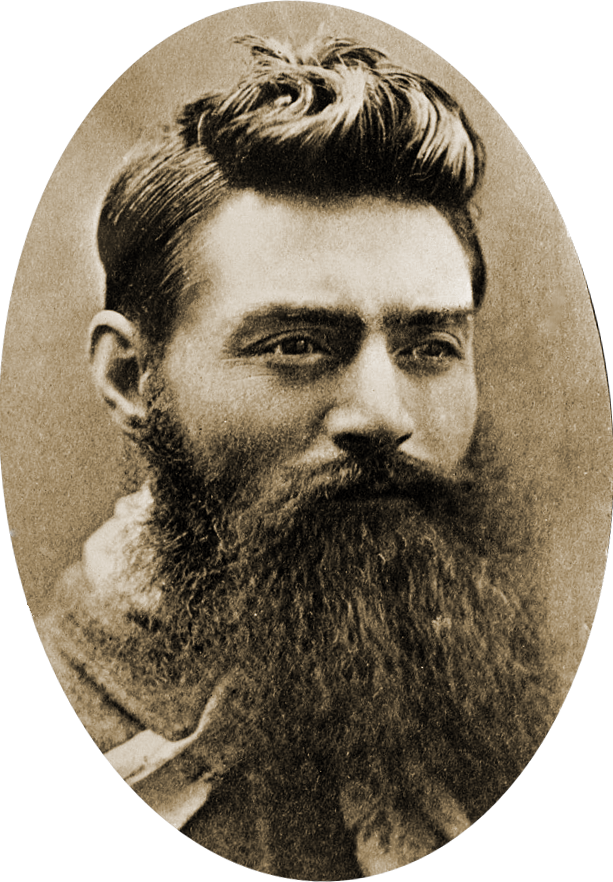
Ned Kelly

Joe Byrne

Kelly is the only person on record to have claimed authorship of the letter, telling a hostage at Jerilderie: "This [the letter] is a bit of my life. I have not had time to finish it. I will finish it some other time."

Although Kelly claimed the letter as his own, the surviving manuscript is in the hand of fellow gang member Byrne, who is traditionally understood to have transcribed Kelly's dictation. Byrne was considered "something of a penman" and had received a few years of schooling, whereas Kelly's formal education and writing skills were more limited. The extent of Byrne's contribution to the text remains uncertain: he may have acted solely as a scribe, or played a more active role in shaping the text through revision, clarification, or contributions of his own. Greer theorises that Kelly probably composed an original draft, possibly in pencil with numerous corrections, which Byrne subsequently copied into the surviving ink manuscript, potentially making minor corrections or alterations in the process. Greer nevertheless concludes that "a single, if inconsistent, very individual voice, emerges from the letter." In 2022, writer David Dufty suggested that the letter may have been co-written by James Wallace, a schoolteacher and Kelly gang sympathiser.

== Content ==
The letter's considerable length, level of detail, and range of topics have given rise to "numerous and varying interpretations", with some viewing it as a work that spans several genres. It has been variously described as a manifesto, a work of "self-propaganda", a "quasi-political, quasi-personal recital of grievance", an apologia that develops into a proclamation, "the longest threatening letter in the history of agrarian rebellion", and "the closest thing we have to an autobiography of Ned Kelly". Owing to its appeals to social justice, the letter has also been described as a "clarion call" on behalf of the rural poor of north-eastern Victoria. It begins:

Dear Sir,

I wish to acquaint you with some of the occurrences of the present past and future.

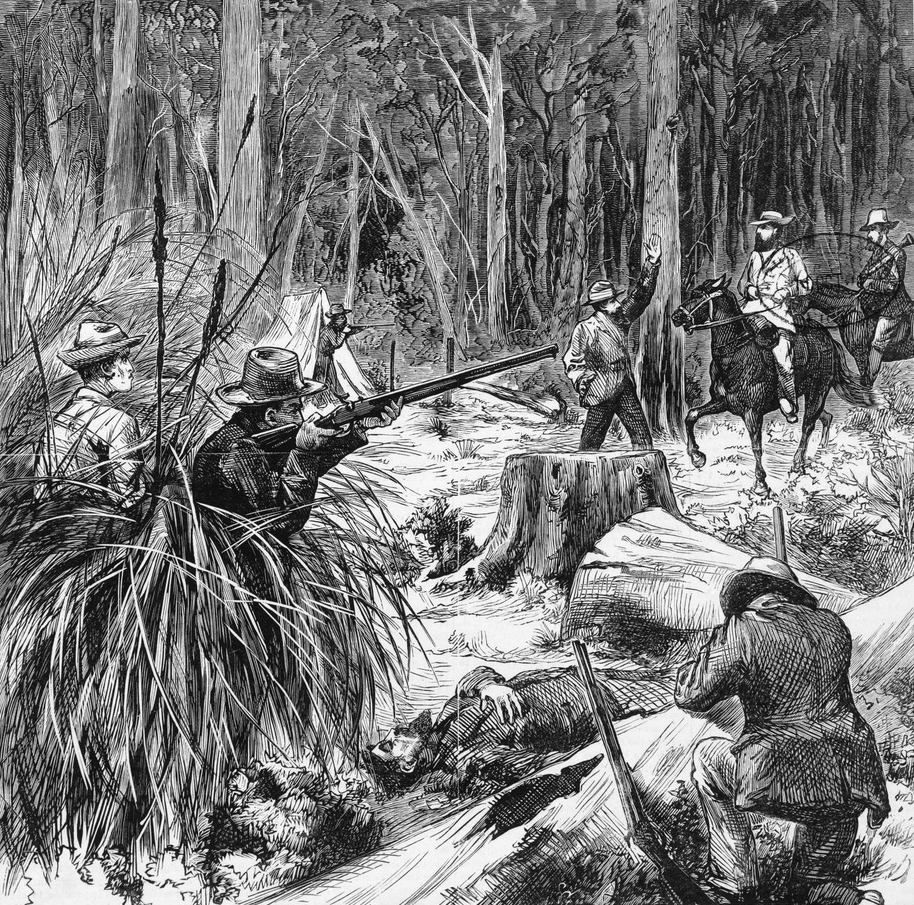
Kelly's account of the Stringybark Creek police killings forms the largest single section of the letter.

Kelly then recounts, in broadly chronological order, his various run-ins with the law. He admits to crimes but attempts to justify many of them as responses to alleged persecution of himself, his family and other poor people by the police and wealthy landholders. He describes his role in what he calls a "wholesale and retail" stock theft operation, stealing "horses and cattle innumerable". Some of these thefts, he argues, were in retaliation for wealthy landholders' unjust and oppressive treatment of poor farmers. In explaining his turn to outlawry, he blames the "Fitzpatrick incident", characterising Alexander Fitzpatrick as a corrupt policeman who falsely accused and fabricated evidence against Kelly family members. The subsequent imprisonment of Kelly's mother, Ellen, is a recurring grievance, and Kelly vows to avenge her. He also gives a detailed account of the Stringybark Creek police killings, arguing that he shot the three officers in self-defence: "... this cannot be called wilful murder for I was compelled to shoot them, or lie down and let them shoot me".

Kelly attacks the police throughout the letter. He accuses individual officers of misconduct, including theft, perjury and excessive use of force. More broadly, he portrays Victoria Police as systemically corrupt and as an instrument of colonial and imperial oppression, serving the interests of wealthy landholders, upholding a corrupt legal system and perpetuating in Australia the injustices of British rule in Ireland. He directs elaborate insults at the force; at one point he describes its members as "a parcel of big ugly fat-necked wombat headed big bellied magpie legged narrow hipped splaw-footed sons of Irish Bailiffs or English landlords". He is particularly scathing of Irish policemen, arguing that, by serving the British Crown, each is a "traitor to his country ancestors and religion". Referring to associates whom he argues were unjustly convicted of horse stealing and aiding and abetting murder, Kelly extends blame to Queen Victoria, declaring her "as guilty ... of what they were convicted for".

Kelly demands justice for his and other poor families in Victoria's north east, and, in "an escalating promise of revenge and retribution", invokes "a mythical tradition of Irish rebellion" against what he calls "the tyrannism of the English yoke":

It will pay Government to give those people who are suffering innocence, justice and liberty. If not I will be compelled to show some colonial strategm which will open the eyes of not only the Victoria Police and inhabitants but also the whole British army and no doubt they will acknowledge their hounds were barking at the wrong stump and that Fitzpatrick will be the cause of greater slaughter to the Union Jack than Saint Patrick was to the snakes and toads in Ireland.

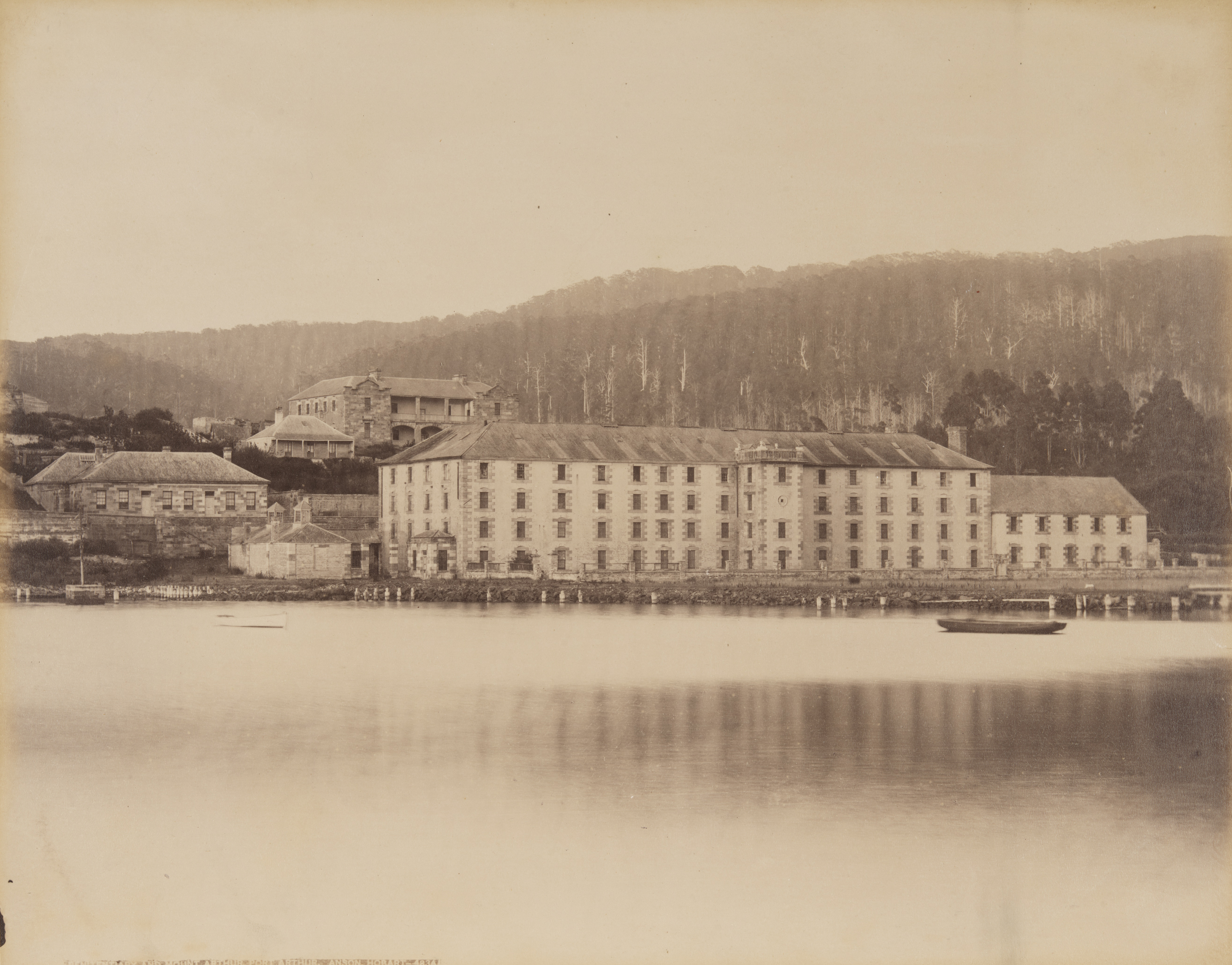
Port Arthur convict settlement, Van Diemen's Land (modern-day Tasmania). Kelly links Australia's convict era to a longer history of Irish suffering under British rule, referring to Van Diemen's Land as "that land of bondage and tyranny", where Irishmen "[pined] their young lives away in starvation and misery".

In a passage that echoes Fenian and revolutionary-republican politics, Kelly envisages a transnational Irish uprising, with the United States "[hoisting] a green flag" and declaring war on England, prompting Irishmen in the British Armed Forces to defect and help restore Ireland's independence. Kelly also draws on traditions of resistance and dissent among earlier generations of Irish Catholic convicts transported to Australia, casting them as heroic martyrs who, rather than "subdue to the Saxon yoke", remained "true to the shamrock" and "bravely died in servile chains". In describing their brutalisation at various convict settlements, Kelly paraphrases a line from the 1830s convict ballad "Moreton Bay", attributed to Frank the Poet (Francis MacNamara), who was imprisoned in Van Diemen's Land (modern-day Tasmania) at the same time as Ned's father, John "Red" Kelly. It is speculated that "Red" knew Frank and passed on his poems to Ned.

The letter is also characterised by an emerging sense of Australian identity grounded in place, class and idiom: Kelly claims Australia as his "own native land", aligns himself with its poor "creoles" and "larrakins", and draws extensively on Australian bush vernacular and local imagery.

Towards the end of the letter, Kelly urges squatters to share their wealth with the poor of their district and cultivate mutual solidarity, arguing that this would ensure their protection more effectively than reliance on the police, which, he warns, would see them "drove to destruction". He goes on to appropriate the power of the state, assuming for himself the authority to issue decrees and exact punishments. He places a bounty on enemies he cannot apprehend himself and proclaims that anyone who assists the police "will be outlawed and declared unfit to be allowed human buriel their property either consumed or confiscated and them theirs and all belonging to them exterminated off the face of the earth". He orders those who have reason to fear him to leave Victoria and contribute 10 per cent of their property to a fund for widows and orphans. He presents this as a final demand before threatening severe consequences for those who defy him:

neglect this and abide by the consequences, which shall be worse than the rust in the wheat in Victoria or the druth of a dry season to the grasshoppers in New South Wales I do not wish to give the order full force without giving timely warning but I am a widows son outlawed and my orders must be obeyed.

== Rediscovery and publication ==
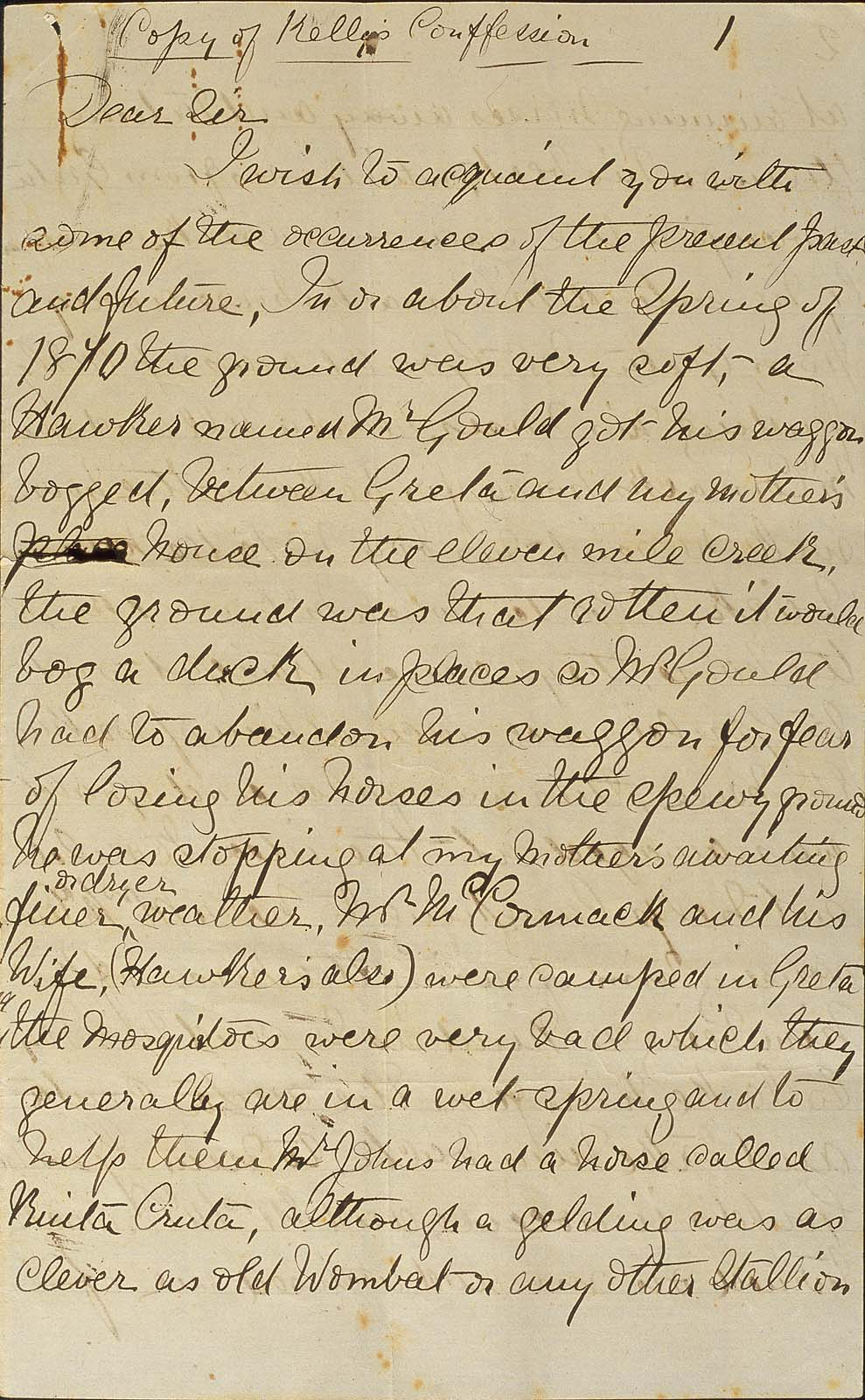
First page of Hanlon's copy

In the decades after the Jerilderie raid, the letter largely faded from public consciousness, though it was occasionally recalled and discussed. One journalist likened it to a "Dick Turpin or Jack Shepherd romance", concluding that its statements "cannot be regarded as reliable". In his 1892 biography of Kelly, The Last of the Bushrangers, Francis Augustus Hare similarly dismissed the letter as "a tissue of lies from beginning to end, a wandering narrative full of insinuations and complaints against the police". A journalist in 1894 highlighted Kelly's Irish nationalist sympathies, calling the letter "an appeal to the Fenians of Australia".

Following Kelly's capture in 1880 and his trial in October of that year for the Stringkybark Creek killings, a government clerk transcribed the letter for use in the Crown's prosecution case, but it was not admitted as evidence. This copy was retained in government archives but remained largely unknown to the public and historians until 1930, when it was published in a mostly complete but slightly bowdlerised form in the Adelaide newspaper The Register News-Pictorial. It formed part of a serialised account of the Kelly gang by journalist J. M. S. Davies, titled "The Kellys Are Out!". The serial was published in Melbourne's The Herald later that year.

Kelly's document was first called the "Jerilderie Letter" by author Max Brown in his 1948 biography of Kelly, Australian Son. Brown included the full letter in the book's appendix and introduced it as follows:

This is the document Kelly handed to Living. The text is from a copy of the original letter made in 1879 or 1880 by a government clerk, and is printed here with such spelling, punctuation, etc, as the clerk or Kelly and Byrne, or all three possessed.

The government copy, now held by Public Record Office Victoria, served as the basis for all published versions of the letter until 2000, when the original was anonymously donated to State Library Victoria after having remained in private hands for decades. Kelly historian Ian Jones recounts locating the original in 1969 through a chain of contacts involving a woman who had nearly persuaded its owner to destroy it. The document was later entrusted to Jones for safekeeping and research. A transcription of the original, with annotations and an introduction by historian Alex McDermott, was published by Faber & Faber in 2001, and reprinted by Text Publishing in 2012 as part of its Australian Classics series. The original has also been digitised and is available online.

John Hanlon's copy resurfaced in 2001, when it was offered for auction by Christie's in Melbourne. It was acquired by the National Museum of Australia.

== Influence on the arts ==
Sidney Nolan, Policeman in Wombat Hole, 1946, Canberra Museum and Gallery. The painting depicts Constable McIntyre hiding from the gang after escaping the Stringybark Creek ambush. It features a wombat, a magpie and a goanna, Australian animals used in the letter to describe and ridicule the police.

Australian artist Sidney Nolan painted numerous Ned Kelly works, beginning with his now-iconic 1946–47 Kelly series, which Nolan later said was inspired by "Kelly's own words, and Rousseau, and sunlight". The Jerilderie Letter in particular "fascinated" Nolan with its "blend of poetry and political engagement". References to the letter appear in later Kelly works by Nolan, including his rendering of Kelly's death mask, Death of a Poet (1954, Walker Art Gallery, Liverpool).

In the early 1960s, British film director Karel Reisz worked on a Ned Kelly film that was ultimately abandoned. While Reisz found most books about Kelly to be of poor quality, he considered the Jerilderie Letter the work of a "tormented visionary" and a "wonderful psychopathic poet".

The letter has been identified as a source of influence on Nick Cave's 1988 song "The Mercy Seat", written as a first-person testimonial from a condemned criminal. According to Adam Steiner, the song bears traces of the Jerilderie Letter's "rebel vernacular ... imbued with a fiery righteousness and forbidding command".

Australian author Peter Carey has said the main influences on his Booker Prize-winning novel True History of the Kelly Gang (2000) were the Jerilderie Letter, Nolan's Ned Kelly paintings, and James Joyce. Carey described Kelly's voice in the Jerilderie Letter as that of an "avant-garde artist with hardly a comma to his name", and in writing True History of the Kelly Gang, he aimed to recreate it. Of his first reading of the Jerilderie Letter, Carey said:

Somewhere in the middle Sixties, I first came upon the 56-page letter which Kelly attempted to have printed when the gang robbed the bank in Jerilderie in 1879. It is an extraordinary document, the passionate voice of a man who is writing to explain his life, save his life, his reputation … And all the time there is this original voice - uneducated but intelligent, funny and then angry, and with a line of Irish invective that would have made Paul Keating envious. His language came in a great, furious rush that could not but remind you of far more literary Irish writers.

Kelly features prominently in American historian and author Donald Akenson's An Irish History of Civilization (2005), an historical-fictional account of the Irish diaspora. Akenson refers to the Jerilderie Letter as "one of the most brilliant pieces of Irish nationalist propaganda ever", and argues that the power of Kelly's rhetoric compares to that of "the greatest of all Irish propaganda-masters", John Mitchel. Akenson continues:

[The letter] is a white-hot blend of vituperation, self-justifcation, theodicy, and paranoid hallucination. It has the same sort of power found in the Book of Enoch, or the Apocalypse of Saint John. Pure hatred, so pure that it becomes apocalyptic art.

Passages from the letter serve as part of the libretto for George Palmer’s five part song cycle, Letters from a Black Snake, commissioned by Ernst & Young in 2007 to commemorate the opening of the first retrospective exhibition of Sidney Nolan.

== Bibliography ==
- Lackey, Michael (2021). Ireland, the Irish, and the Rise of Biofiction. Bloomsbury Publishing. ISBN 9781501378492.
- McCarthy, Conor (2020). Outlaws and Spies: Legal Exclusion in Law and Literature. Edinburgh University Press. ISBN 9781474455954.
- Kelly, Ned (2012). McDermott, Alex (ed.). The Jerilderie Letter. Text Publishing Company. ISBN 9781921922336.
