= The Last Outlaw (miniseries) =

1980 TV mini-series

- Written by: Ian Jones; Bronwyn Binns
- Directed by: George T. Miller; Kevin Dobson
- Starring: John Jarratt; Steve Bisley
- Composer: Brian May
- Country of origin: Australia
- Original language: English
- No. of episodes: 4

Production
- Executive producers: Ian Jones; Bronwyn Binns
- Producer: Roger Le Mesurier
- Cinematography: Ernest Clark
- Editor: Philip Reid
- Running time: 380 minutes (95 min each)
- Production company: Pegasus Productions
- Budget: $2 million

Original release
- Network: Seven Network
- Release: 20 October 1980 – 1980

The Last Outlaw is a 1980 Australian four-part television miniseries based on the life of Ned Kelly. It was shot from February to May 1980 and the end of its original broadcast, in October–November 1980, coincided with the centenary of Ned Kelly's death.

== Cast ==
Starring

- John Jarratt as Ned Kelly

Supporting Cast

- Elaine Cusick as Ellen Kelly
- Paul Mason as George King
- Gerard Kennedy as Harry Power
- Jackie Kerin as Annie Kelly
- Debra Lawrance as Maggie Kelly
  - Natalie Harte as young Maggie
- Paul Trahair as Jim Kelly
- John Ley as Dan Kelly
  - Bill Salt as young Dan
- Sigrid Thornton as Kate Kelly
- Kaarin Fairfax as Grace Kelly
- Les Dayman as Jack Lloyd
- Lewis Fitz-Gerald as Tom Lloyd
- David Bradshaw as Wild Wright
- John Murphy as Father Charles O'Hea
- John Stone as Supt. Charles Nicolson
- Stephen Millichamp as Const. Edward Hall
- Stewart Faichney as Sgt. James Babington
- Colin Setches as Trooper
- Don Barker as Publican
- Kevin Summers as Jack McMonigle
- Peter Scollin as Dummy Wright
- Ben Hall as Coach Driver
- Ed Rosser as Magistrate
- Tommy Dysart as Superintendent
- Jeffrey Booth as Buggy Driver
- Richard Murphy as Convict
- Ian Clutterham as Goal Governor
- Malcolm Darby as Chief Warder
- Rob Constable as Warder
- Roger Stephens as Driver’s Mate
- Melvyn Harrison as Blacktracker
- Carl Carmichael as Barman
- Steve Bisley as Joe Byrne
- Ric Herbert as Steve Hart
- Peter Hehir as Aaron Sherritt
- Celia de Burgh as Catherine Lloyd
- Jackie Kelleher as Mrs. Byrne
- Norman Kaye as Supt. John Sadleir
- Tim Eliott as Sgt. Arthur Steele
- Anthony Hawkins as Supt. Francis Hare
- Paul Clarkson as Capt. Frederick Standish
- Michael Cole as Sgt. Whelan
- Frank Gallacher as Det. Michael Ward
- Peter Stratford as Scott
- Julia Blake as Mrs Scott
- Paul Rettke as George Stephens
- Ernie Bourne as James Gloster
- Charles Gilroy as Tennant
- George Cunningham as McCauley
- Ian Cumming as Alexander Fitzpatrick
- Janet Lord as Mrs. Fitzgerald
- Peter Curtin as Constable Henry Richards
- James Wright as Edward Living
- Robert Bell as Sen. Const. George Devine
- Anne Scott-Pendlebury as Mrs. Devine
- Warwick Randall as Alfred Tarleton
- Andrew Gilmour as Rankin
- Roy Baldwin as Farmer
- Col Elliott as Grocer
- Ric Harley as Sub-Insp. Stanhope O’Connor
- Howard Eynon as Const. Alexander
- Kim Trengove as Belle Sheritt
- Lulu Pinkus as Helen
- Ann Henderson as Jane Jones
- Patsy Dance as Mrs. Jones
- David Clendinning as Judge Redmond Barry
- John Lee as Father Matthew Gibney
- Malcolm Steed as Dean Father Donaghy
- Bill Connolly as S. Const. Charles Johnston
- Matthew King as Const. James Arthur
- Trevor Kilgour as Const. Hugh Bracken
- Paul Young as Thomas Curnow
- Mary Charleston as Kate Byrne
- Jane Coghlan as Mrs. Barry

== Production ==
The mini-series was made by Pegasus Productions, the company of Ian Jones and Browyn Binns, who made the hugely popular mini-series Against the Wind. Jones had long been interested in the story of Ned Kelly and did extensive research. "I recognised the impossibility of his situation in a frontier society," said Jones. "He was the centre of a tragedy which could have been avoided." Jones wanted to make the series in part to make amends for his dissatisfaction with the 1970 film Ned Kelly.

Filming took six months.

== Reception ==
The mini-series was considered a ratings disappointment, which Albert Moran blamed partly on its screening (deliberately) late in the year, to coincide with the centenary of Kelly's hanging. He reckoned it was superior to Against the Wind; Jarratt as Kelly was particularly impressive.

== Home media ==
The complete miniseries was released on region 4 DVD in Australia by Umbrella Entertainment.
