= True History of the Kelly Gang (film) =

2019 film by Justin Kurzel

- United Kingdom release poster
- Directed by: Justin Kurzel
- Screenplay by: Shaun Grant
- Based on: True History of the Kelly Gang by Peter Carey
- Produced by: Liz Watts; Hal Vogel; Justin Kurzel; Paul Ranford
- Starring: George MacKay; Essie Davis; Nicholas Hoult; Orlando Schwerdt; Thomasin McKenzie; Sean Keenan; Charlie Hunnam; Russell Crowe
- Cinematography: Ari Wegner
- Edited by: Nick Fenton
- Music by: Jed Kurzel
- Production companies: Porchlight Films; Daybreak Pictures; Memento Films; Film Victoria; Screen Australia; Film4
- Distributed by: Transmission Films; Stan (Australia); Picturehouse Entertainment (United Kingdom)
- Release dates: 11 September 2019 (TIFF); 9 January 2020 (Australia); 28 February 2020 (United Kingdom)
- Running time: 124 minutes
- Countries: United Kingdom; Australia
- Language: English
- Box office: $446,177

True History of the Kelly Gang is a 2019 bushranger film directed by Justin Kurzel, written by Shaun Grant, and based upon the 2000 novel of the same name by Peter Carey. A fictionalised account of the life of bushranger and outlaw Ned Kelly, the film stars George MacKay, Essie Davis, Nicholas Hoult, Charlie Hunnam, and Russell Crowe.

It had its world premiere at the Toronto International Film Festival on 11 September 2019. It was released in Australia on Australia Day 2020, by Transmission Films and Stan, in the United Kingdom on 28 February 2020, by Picturehouse Entertainment, and in the United States on 24 April 2020, by IFC Films.

== Plot ==
Based on Peter Carey's novel of the same name, the film is a highly-fictionalised account of the life of Australian bushranger Ned Kelly and his gang as they flee from authorities during the 1870s.

Although the following facts are not made clear in the film, in reality Ned Kelly's father, John "Red" Kelly (Gentle Ben Corbett), was an Irishman transported to a prison colony in Van Diemen's Land, who eventually settled in the colony of Victoria, Australia. After marrying Ned's mother Ellen (Essie Davis), the Kellys settled in a rural area northeast of Melbourne. Before the film's narrative begins, Red Kelly has had numerous brushes with the colonial police forces. Toward the start of the film he has another confrontation with the constabulary which results in his imprisonment and death when his son Ned (Orlando Schwerdt) is twelve years old. Ned is a courageous and compassionate boy, in one instance jumping into a river to save another boy from drowning. Ned is shocked when he finds evidence that his father has been cross-dressing while carrying out his outlaw raids.

Ned's mother attempts to provide for her children by running a still or shebeen, providing sexual favours to Sergeant O'Neill (Charlie Hunnam), and taking on a series of lovers, eventually including the notorious bushranger Harry Power (Russell Crowe). Power takes on young Ned as an apprentice and provides him with knowledge of the land, hideouts, and strategies for bushranging. Under pressure from Power, Ned shoots Sergeant O'Neil but refuses to kill him, despite Power ordering him to do so. Ned leaves Power and returns to his family's settlement, infuriated since he has learned that his mother essentially "sold" him to Power. Ned is soon arrested and sentenced to three years in prison for shooting O'Neill. After his eventual release, Ned (now played by George MacKay) returns to his mother's house as a young man.

During a visit to a brothel, Ned meets a prostitute who is a young Irish girl named Mary (Thomasin McKenzie), falls in love with her, and begins his first sexual relationship. Ned eventually becomes an outlaw after a visit from a local police officer, Constable Fitzpatrick (Nicholas Hoult), to the Kelly family. The constable attempts to woo Ned's younger sister Kate, to whom he has given a dress. After his mother Ellen attacks him, Fitzpatrick pulls his revolver on the family and Ned shoots him in the hand to defend them. Warrants for the arrest of Ned and his little brother Dan are issued.

Ned and Dan hide out in the hills (which, in reality, were in northeast Victoria), and are joined by their friends Steve Hart (Louis Hewison) and Ned's close mate Joe Byrne (Sean Keenan). They later become known as the Kelly Gang, as Ned more and more assumes the role of leader. The gang has a belief that they were Sons of Sieve, a historical Irish resistance group. Kelly's mother is arrested along with her baby daughter and imprisoned in Melbourne as enticement for Ned to give himself up. Ned finds and kills Fitzpatrick. Four constables are sent to kill the Gang after efforts to arrest them prove unsuccessful. The Gang ambushes them at Stringybark Creek, where Ned kills three of them during a gun battle.

In time, the Gang is discovered to be in the town of Glenrowan where they take numerous hostages and construct several suits of plate-steel armour for protection in gun battles. One of the hostages is the crippled local schoolmaster (Jacob Collins-Levy), who encourages Ned to relate the story of his life after seeing samples of Ned's writing. Ned and the gang plan to ambush a train full of constables sent to capture them by sabotaging the tracks so that the train will wreck. But the schoolmaster betrays the Gang by warning the incoming constables. The policemen surround the inn where the Gang is hiding and in a series of striking, hallucinogenic scenes, engage in a furious shootout, seriously wounding the armour-clad Ned and killing the other three members of the Gang. The twenty-five year old Ned is convicted of murdering one of the constables at Stringybark Creek, and is hanged at Old Melbourne Gaol after his mother sees him a final time and urges him to "die like a Kelly."

== Cast ==
- George MacKay as Ned Kelly
  - Orlando Schwerdt as young Ned Kelly
- Russell Crowe as Harry Power
- Nicholas Hoult as Constable Fitzpatrick
- Essie Davis as Ellen Kelly
- Sean Keenan as Joe Byrne
- Jacob Collins-Levy as Thomas Curnow
- Thomasin McKenzie as Mary Hearn
- Charlie Hunnam as Sergeant O'Neill
- Claudia Karvan as Ms. Shelton
- Marlon Williams as George King
- Gentle Ben Corbett as Red Kelly
- Earl Cave as Dan Kelly
- Louis Hewison as Steve Hart
- Anni Finsterer as Mrs Gill

== Production ==
Director Justin Kurzel mentioned he was developing the film in December 2016 while doing press for Assassin's Creed.

In November 2017, the project was officially announced, with George MacKay cast as Ned Kelly, and Russell Crowe, Nicholas Hoult and Essie Davis making up the supporting cast. Filming was announced as beginning in March 2018 in Victoria, Australia. By April, the film's production start was shifted to July. Production started on 22 July. It was revealed in September that Charlie Hunnam was cast in the film.

== Release ==
The film premiered at the Toronto International Film Festival on 11 September 2019, and was released in Australian cinemas in 2020 by Transmission Films. Australian streaming rights were acquired by Stan, which released the film on their service as a Stan original. The film was given a limited release in Australian cinemas 9 January 2020 with planned wide release on Stan on Australia Day, 26 January 2020.

Picturehouse Entertainment scheduled release of the film theatrically in the UK and Ireland starting 28 February 2020.

In September 2019, IFC Films acquired U.S. distribution rights to the film. It was released on 24 April 2020. and was number 1 at the box office.

== Reception ==
On Rotten Tomatoes, True History of the Kelly Gang holds an approval rating of 80% based on 165 reviews, with an average rating of 6.9/10. The site's critical consensus reads: "Its unusual approach won't be for all viewers, but True History of the Kelly Gang takes a distinctively postmodern look at Australia's past." On Metacritic, the film has a weighted average score of 75 out of 100, based on 27 critics, indicating "generally favorable reviews".

== See also ==
- Cultural depictions of Ned Kelly
