= Jerilderie Herald and Urana Advertiser =

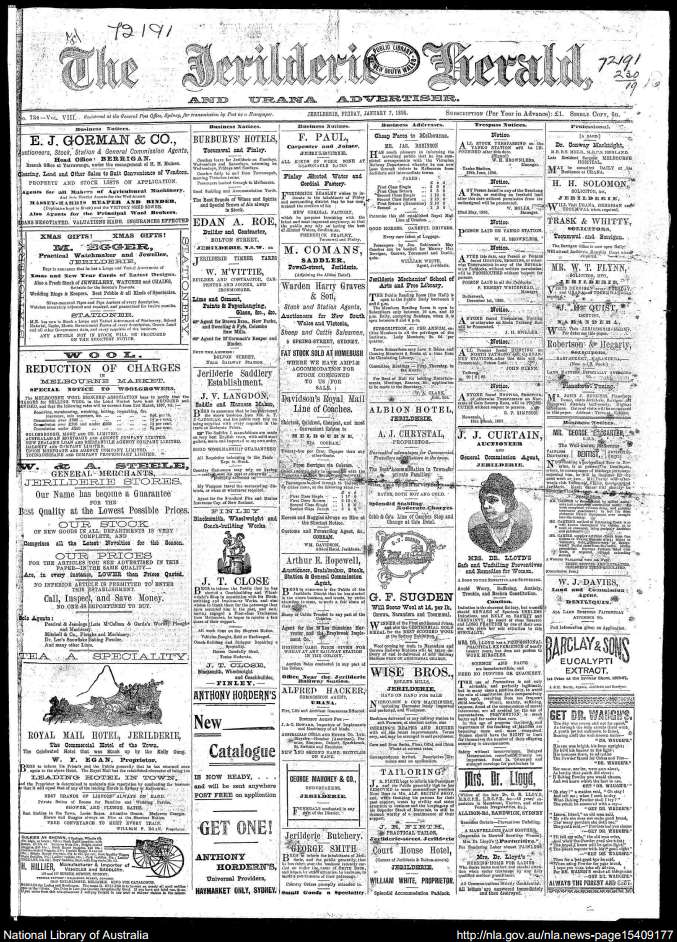
Front page of the Jerilderie Herald and Urana Advertiser on 7 January 1898.

The Jerilderie Herald and Urana Advertiser, later published as the Jerilderie-Coleambally Herald and Urana Advertiser, was a weekly newspaper published in Jerilderie, New South Wales, Australia.

== History ==
The Jerilderie Herald and Urana Advertiser was in publication by 1885 and was published under this name until 1968. In 1969 its name changed to Jerilderie-Coleambally Herald and Urana Advertiser, and it was published under this name until the newspaper ceased publication in 1972. The paper changed hands a number of times. In 1885 it was bought by William Elliott, a local schoolmaster, who then ran the paper until his death in 1934.

=== Account of the Kelly Gang at Jerilderie ===
Elliott was held hostage at the Royal Mail Hotel during the Kelly Gang's robbery of the nearby bank in 1879, and later published an account of the gang's activities at Jerilderie in the Herald. The account, based on Elliott's diaries and recollections, was published in serial form in 35 parts over 9 months from 4 July 1913 to 3 April 1914. His account is notable as it records his conversation with Joe Byrne where Byrne told Elliott the route the gang had taken to reach Jerilderie, and being based on Elliott's diaries has been identified as one of the main primary sources relating to the Jerilderie raid.

== Digitisation ==
The paper has been digitised as part of the Australian Newspapers Digitisation Program of the National Library of Australia.

== See also ==
- List of newspapers in New South Wales
