= William Bede Melville =

Australian journalist and politician

William Bede Melville (c. 1870 – 19 May 1914), commonly known as Billy Melville, was an Australian journalist and politician.

== History ==
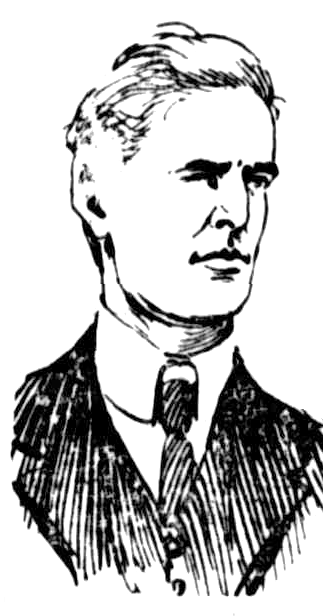
W. B. Melville

Melville was born in Molong, New South Wales and educated for the law, but was attracted to journalism, and in 1890 joined The Australian Star, a Sydney newspaper founded by W. H. Traill, to further his protectionist politics, which accorded with Melville's beliefs. Melville became an ardent campaigner for Protectionism, and tried to enter parliament on numerous occasions: three times he stood for the Legislative Assembly seat of Molong, once for the Federal Division of Calare, and one attempt on the seat of Randwick, each time unsuccessfully. He contributed a great deal of satirical writing under various pseudonyms to Australia newspapers.

He was private secretary to Sir George Dibbs around the time Dibbs was premier of New South Wales (presumably January – March 1889, not October – December 1885 or October 1891 – August 1894). They were on opposing sides on many political questions however, and Melville returned to the "Inky Way". He moved to Melbourne and started working for The Age, meanwhile contributing news of Melbourne to the Star under the heading "By Yarra's Banks".

When the various Australian States began sending troops to South Africa in support of Britain's war against the Boers, Melville gained passage to Cape Town, and began contributing racy reports to London's Daily Mail. One sensational story involved his discovery that the bushrangers Dan Kelly and Steve Hart had escaped the fire at Glenrowan, and were fighting alongside the British troops. His report was reproduced in The Argus. While talk of the Federation referendum was in the air, Melville wrote many articles in favour of the proposal.

Melville was fond of drinking with fellow bohemians, and a member of Victor Daley's "Dawn and Dusk Club". He got into irredeemable difficulties when after one such drinking session he was charged with "wilfully and obscenely exposing himself on the 21st December" 1910, and could have been observed by a lady passer-by. As it was clear he had been incapable at the time of wilfully doing anything, the charge was reduced to "offending against decency" and he was fined 20s.

Sir George Dibbs encountered Melville again, and under different circumstances: he was at the Bathurst Show in his official capacity, strutting about in a tall top hat and smoking a big cigar, when he recognised Melville who, down on his luck, had taken a position as sideshow barker.

He completed a 40-chapter novel titled A Merchant Princess in 1899 and hoped to find a publisher in England in 1902. In the end, it was serialised in The Telegraph in 1905. He also wrote a volume of some 300 short biographies, Greatest Australians, which was published in 1913 by Frank Adams Press.

In later years he was on the staff of the Country Press Association and for many years responsible for the production of Wimble's Reminder, a printers' trade magazine. At the time of his death he was editor of The Bystander.

Melville died of pneumonia at Sydney Hospital on 19 May 1914. His funeral took place at his graveside at Waverley Cemetery three days later.
