= The Australian Bystander =

Australian magazine

The Bystander was a weekly magazine published in Sydney, Australia, devoted to personalities and popular culture, along the lines of Melbourne's Table Talk. Later titled The Australian Bystander, it ran from 1914 to 1924.

== History ==
The first issue of the magazine was published in March 1914 and was praised for its production values and particularly for its illustrations, but contained egregious errors of fact.

The magazine was published by Frank Adams, managing director of N.S.W. Country Press Co-operative Company, Ltd, and proprietor of the Walgett Spectator, of which his brother George Adams was editor. (Note: They were sons of gold miner S. Adams and Mary Adams Their sister, Mary Jane Adams (c. 1867 – 7 August 1929) married Arthur Stephen Jackson (c. 1859 – 18 February 1933), a real estate maven.) Their photographer was Monte Luke. Its founding editor was William Bede Melville, who died in May 1914, shortly after the launch.

In January 1925 E. T. Kibblewhite & Co., of 29 Milford Street, Sydney, announced they had purchased the business, and intended continuing the imprint, but with more items of interest to Australian women. Publication appears never to have resumed, but the title was attached to a book of crossword puzzles, with cash prizes offered for their solution.
