= Charles O'Hea =

Irish-Australian priest (1814–1903)

- Born: 1 April 1814; County Cork, Ireland
- Died: 31 August 1903 (aged 89)
- Resting place: Grave
- Occupation: Priest
- Title: Monsignor
- Predecessor: Patrick Dunne

Monsignor Charles Adolphus O'Hea OSA (1814–1903) was an Irish Australian Catholic Priest. He began his ministry in Ireland before travelling to Melbourne, Australia where he lived until his death. He is best known for establishing a number of churches north of Melbourne and for both baptizing and administering last rites to the bushranger Ned Kelly.

== Early life ==
Charles Adolphus O'Hea was born on 1 April 1814 in County Cork to parents James O'Hea and Elizabeth de Lacey Evans. He was the youngest child of a large family, members of which eventually went on to represent various professions. Educated in Rome, he entered the Order of the Hermits of St. Augustine in Drogheda in 1844, was later ordained, and engaged himself in missionary works in Ireland.

In February 1853, O'Hea arrived at Hobsons Bay, Victoria, from London on board the barque the Koh-I-Noor along with four other priests. By chance he had met the first bishop of Melbourne, James Alipius Goold, in Rome in 1852 and volunteered to travel to Australia to assist in establishing new churches in the State. Later newspapers describe him as being "... a man of magnificent physique and dominating personality..." and a man of means. He was well known for his charitable works and his wealth allowed him to achieve much more for his ministry than would be allowable with his stipend.

== Career ==
Taking over from the Rev Patrick Dunne, O'Hea was assigned as the new Pastor to a large district which extended from Brunswick to Yan Yean 30 km north of Melbourne. The area included two churches, one at Coburg and the other in Epping and he received an annual stipend of £200 with an additional £100 from the Government for his work as prison chaplain. He made his base at St. Paul's Church, Coburg, which was opened in August 1855.

He served both the community of HM Prison Pentridge itself and the residents of the area from 1853 to 1882 when he was made Dean. In 1867 O'Hea called a public meeting to discuss the potential for changing the name of the local area, as "Pentridge" was seen as too evocative of the prison. As a result of this meeting, the name of the suburb was changed to Coburg. To show the esteem in which he was held a street was named after him in that suburb.

During his time in Melbourne, he was responsible for the building of four churches: St. John's at Beveridge, Victoria (1862); St. Ambrose Church, Brunswick (1869); and Woodstock and Epping (1879). All four were constructed from local basalt in the Gothic Revival architectural style.

The church community at Beveridge included Ned Kelly, who lived there during his early years, and the rest of the Kelly family who lived in the town. O'Hea baptised Kelly who along with his siblings attended the parish school. On 11 November 1880 O'Hea also administered the Catholic sacrament of Extreme Unction (as it was then called) to Kelly at the Old Melbourne Gaol shortly before the bushranger was hanged, and remained near Kelly during the execution. Fr O'Hea was described by Hugh McCrae "as a burly priest, developed like a Thessalonian bull, fisted like a Castor or Pollux; yet withal a learned man, a witty one, and a friend of the masses."

== Later life ==
O'Hea retired in 1882 and was given the title Monsignor around 1893 possibly for his financial support to the papal treasury. He lived in retirement in what was the Mercy Convent, Coburg, and died on 31 August 1903, aged nearly ninety. His remains were interred in the crypt for Roman Catholic priests at the chapel in Melbourne General Cemetery.

== Legacy ==
O'Hea appears briefly in the film Ned Kelly (1970), played by Gerry Duggan He is depicted conducting a secret marriage ceremony between Kelly and Caitlyn (a character believed to based upon his cousin Catherine Lloyd) on the night before Kelly's execution.. In reality, there is no evidence that Kelly was ever in a relationship.

In the 1980 miniseries The Last Outlaw, he was played by John Murphy.

== Bibliography ==
- Ebsworth, Rev. Walter (1973). Pioneer Catholic Victoria. Polding Press. ISBN 0-85884-096-0.
