= Michael Edward Ward =

- Born: 1845, Ballinasloe
- Died: 27 May 1921; Melbourne
- Burial: 28 May 1921; Melbourne General Cemetery
- Wives: Ellen McDonald (m. 1882); Margaret Mary Aiken (m. 1902)
- Issue: Charles Hayes Ward (1896–1977)
- Father: John Ward
- Mother: Mary Caulfield
- Religion: Roman Catholic

Michael Edward Ward (1845 – 27 May 1921) was an Irish-Australian detective, best known for his role in the capture of Ned Kelly and his brother Dan Kelly during the Kelly Outbreak of 1879/1880.

== Early and Family life ==
Ward was born the second son to John Ward, a large farmer, in Kidlawn (a townland in the parish of Moore) near Ballinasloe, County Galway, Ireland in about 1845. He had at least two other brothers; Peter and James. In 1865 at the age of 20, Ward emigrated from Liverpool to Melbourne on board the Marco Polo. By 1869, he had settled in the Benalla/Beechworth area where he remained for about 11 years. In 1880, he moved to Melbourne where he met his first wife, Ellen "Nellie" McDonald, whom he married in 1882. Ellen died in 1890 at the age of thirty of a pelvic abscess. Twelve years later, Ward married Margaret Mary Aiken, a native of Benalla with whom he lived until his death in 1921. The couple adopted Charles Eustace Hayes, an English orphan born in Blackpool in about 1912. Hayes had his name changed by deed poll on 12 March 1920 to Charles Hayes Ward

== Career ==
Michael E. Ward joined the police force in October 1869 and was stationed at Benalla and Beechworth. In 1876, he was promoted to the rank of detective.

In this position he was instrumental in the capture of members of the Kelly gang. A number of books have been written about the efforts of Ward and his colleagues to capture these outlaws. News reports as far away as England kept the public up to date on the chase. Ward's persistent pursuit frustrated Kelly, who sent death threats to the detective. Eventually Ward devised a trap which involved considerable trickery and misdirection; Kelly later accused him of threatening to harm his family.

Ward's experiences were the basis for a character in Rolph Bolderwood's romantic crime fiction work. Robbery Under Arms.

Following the Kelly Outbreak, Ward was transferred to Melbourne in 1880, where he served until his retirement, having reached the rank of Sub-Inspector, in 1905. Ward's career was distinguished not only for his role in the capture of the Kellys but also many other high-profile arrests such as that of Ferozi Fathay Mahommed in 1904
