= Alexander Fitzpatrick =

Australian police officer (1856–1924)

- Fitzpatrick in Beechworth, 19th century
- Born: 18 February 1856; Mount Egerton, Colony of Victoria, Australia
- Died: 6 May 1924 (aged 68); Glenferrie, Victoria, Australia

Constable Alexander Fitzpatrick (18 February 1856 – 6 May 1924) was an Australian police officer known for his association with the bushranger Ned Kelly. On 11 April 1878, he confronted Kelly's brother Dan at the Kelly family residence, resulting in a violent altercation later known as the "Fitzpatrick incident".

Conflicting accounts given by Fitzpatrick and the Kelly family have led to sharply divided historical interpretations, with some historians portraying Fitzpatrick as a drunken womaniser, while others regard him as a competent constable whose reputation was damaged by the Kelly family's claims.

== Early life ==
Alexander Fitzpatrick was born on 18 February 1856 in Mount Egerton, Victoria. His parents, Charles and Jane, were English. Charles was a carpenter.

== "Fitzpatrick incident" ==
=== Fitzpatrick's version of events ===
On 11 April 1878, Constable Strachan of Greta heard that Ned was at a shearing shed in NSW and left to apprehend him. Four days later, Constable Fitzpatrick arrived at Greta for relief duty and called at the Kellys' home to arrest Dan for horse theft. Finding Dan absent, Fitzpatrick stayed and conversed with Ellen Kelly. When Dan and his brother-in-law Bill Skillion arrived later that evening, Fitzpatrick informed Dan that he was under arrest. Dan asked to be allowed to have dinner first. The constable consented and stood guard over his prisoner.

Minutes later, Ned rushed in and shot at Fitzpatrick with a revolver, missing him. Ellen then hit Fitzpatrick over the head with a fire shovel. A struggle ensued and Ned fired again, wounding Fitzpatrick above his left wrist. Skillion and Williamson came in, brandishing revolvers, and Dan disarmed Fitzpatrick.

Ned apologised to Fitzpatrick, saying that he mistook him for another constable. Fitzpatrick fainted and when he regained consciousness Ned compelled him to extract the bullet from his own arm with a knife; Ellen dressed the wound. Ned devised a cover story and promised to reward Fitzpatrick if he adhered to it. Fitzpatrick was allowed to leave. About 1.5 km away he noticed two horsemen in pursuit, so he spurred his horse into a gallop to escape. He reached a hotel where his wound was re-bandaged, then rode to Benalla to report the incident.

=== Kelly family version of events ===
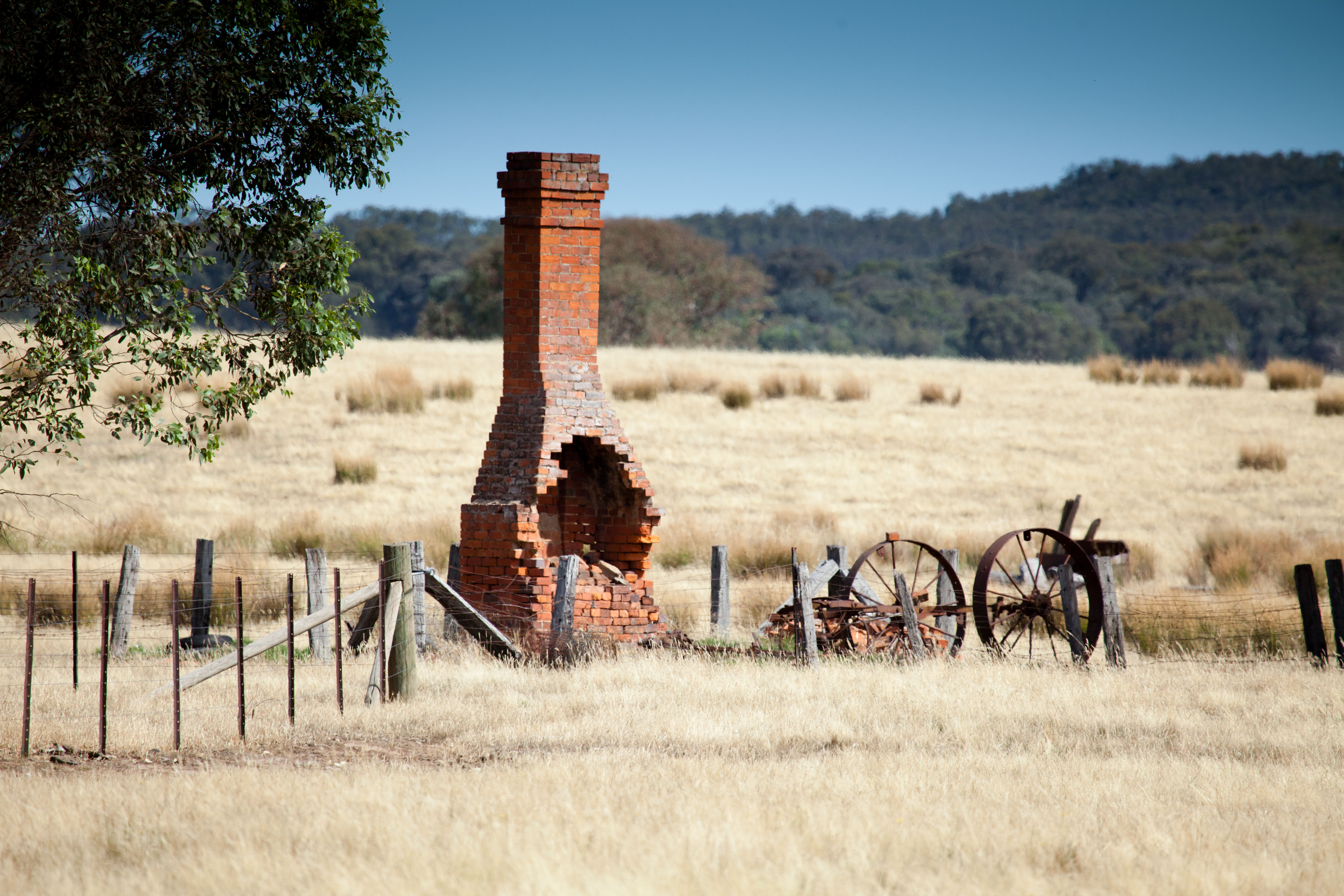
Remains of the Kelly residence at Greta, site of the Fitzpatrick incident

Kelly and members of his family gave conflicting accounts of the Fitzpatrick incident. Kelly initially claimed he was away from Greta at the time, and that if Fitzpatrick suffered any wounds, they were probably self-inflicted. In 1879, Kelly's sister Kate stated that he shot Fitzpatrick after the constable had made a sexual advance to her. After Kelly was captured in 1880, he called it "a foolish story", and three policemen gave sworn evidence that he admitted he had shot Fitzpatrick.

In 1881, Brickey Williamson, who was seeking remission for his sentence in relation to the incident, stated that Kelly shot Fitzpatrick after the constable had drawn his revolver. Many years later, Kelly's brother Jim and cousin Tom Lloyd claimed that Fitzpatrick was drunk when he arrived at the house, and while seated, pulled Kate onto his knee, provoking Dan to throw him to the floor. In the ensuing struggle, Fitzpatrick drew his revolver, Ned appeared, and with Dan seized and disarmed the constable, who later claimed a wrist injury from a door lock was a gunshot wound.

Kelly scholars Jones and Dawson conclude that Kelly shot Fitzpatrick but it was his friend Joe Byrne who was with him, not Bill Skillion.

=== Trial ===
Williamson, Skillion and Ellen Kelly were arrested and charged with aiding and abetting attempted murder; Ned and Dan were nowhere to be found. The three appeared on 9 October 1878 before Judge Redmond Barry. Fitzpatrick's doctor, who had treated his wound, gave evidence that the constable "was certainly not drunk" and that his wounds were consistent with his statement. The defence called two witnesses to give evidence that Skillion was not present, which would cast doubt on Fitzpatrick's account. One of these witnesses, a family relative, swore that Ned was in Greta that afternoon, which was damaging to the defence. Ellen Kelly, Skillion and Williamson were convicted as accessories to the attempted murder of Fitzpatrick. Skillion and Williamson both received sentences of six years and Ellen three years of hard labour.

== Death ==
Fitzpatrick died on 6 May 1924 at his residence in Glenferrie, Victoria. He did not die of liver problems, as some sources have commonly stated.

== Legacy ==
Stuart Dawson's 2015 paper Redeeming Fitzpatrick discusses the historical interpretation of Fitzpatrick, which has been divided by his own account and the Kellys' accounts. Some historians portray Fitzpatrick as a womaniser who harassed the Kelly family, while others regard him as a competent constable.

Fitzpatrick was portrayed by actor Kiri Paramore in the 2003 film Ned Kelly.
