= Stringybark Creek =

River in Victoria, Australia

Coordinates: 36°52′03″S 146°11′59″E

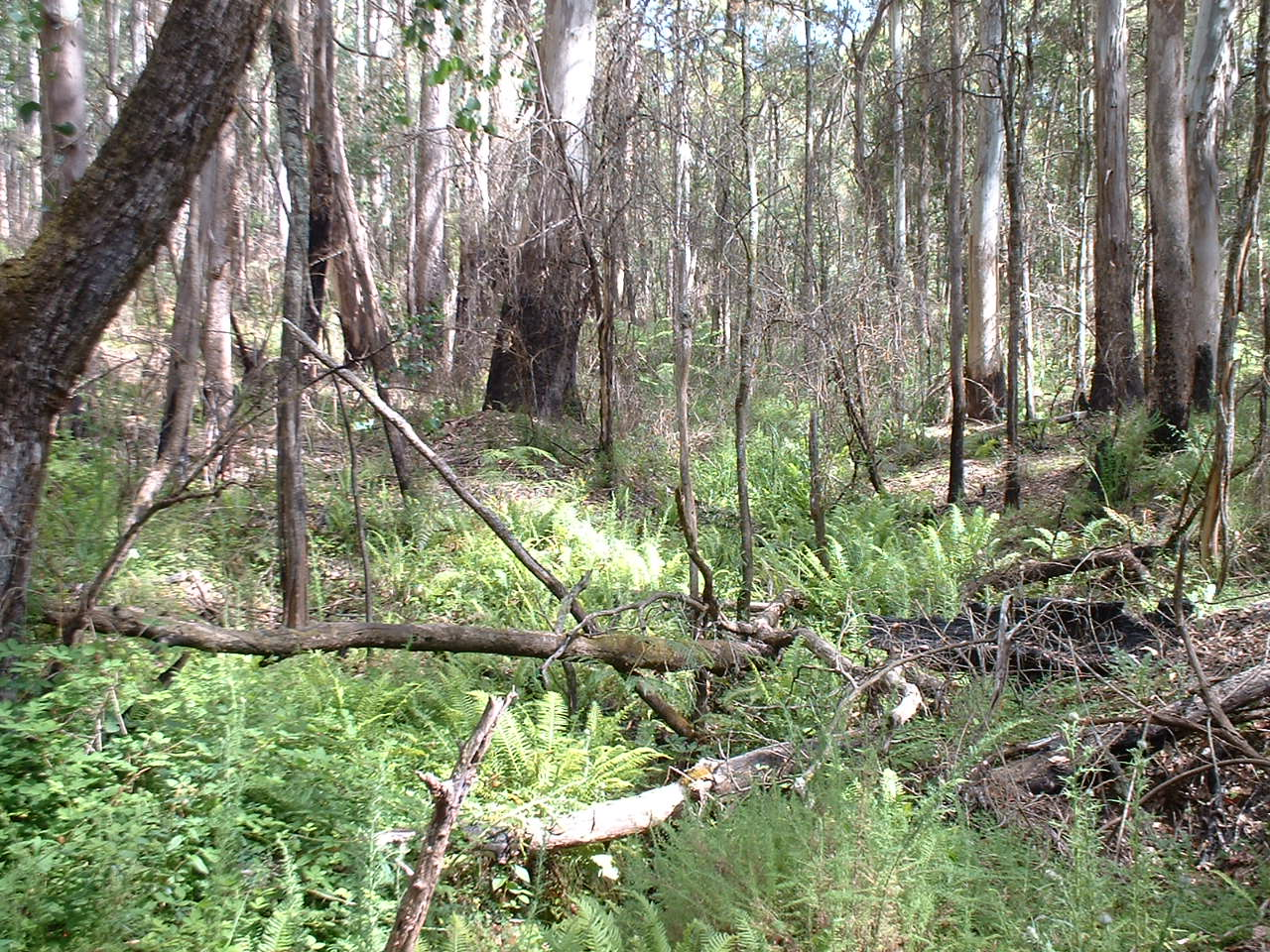
Stringybark Creek, Victoria

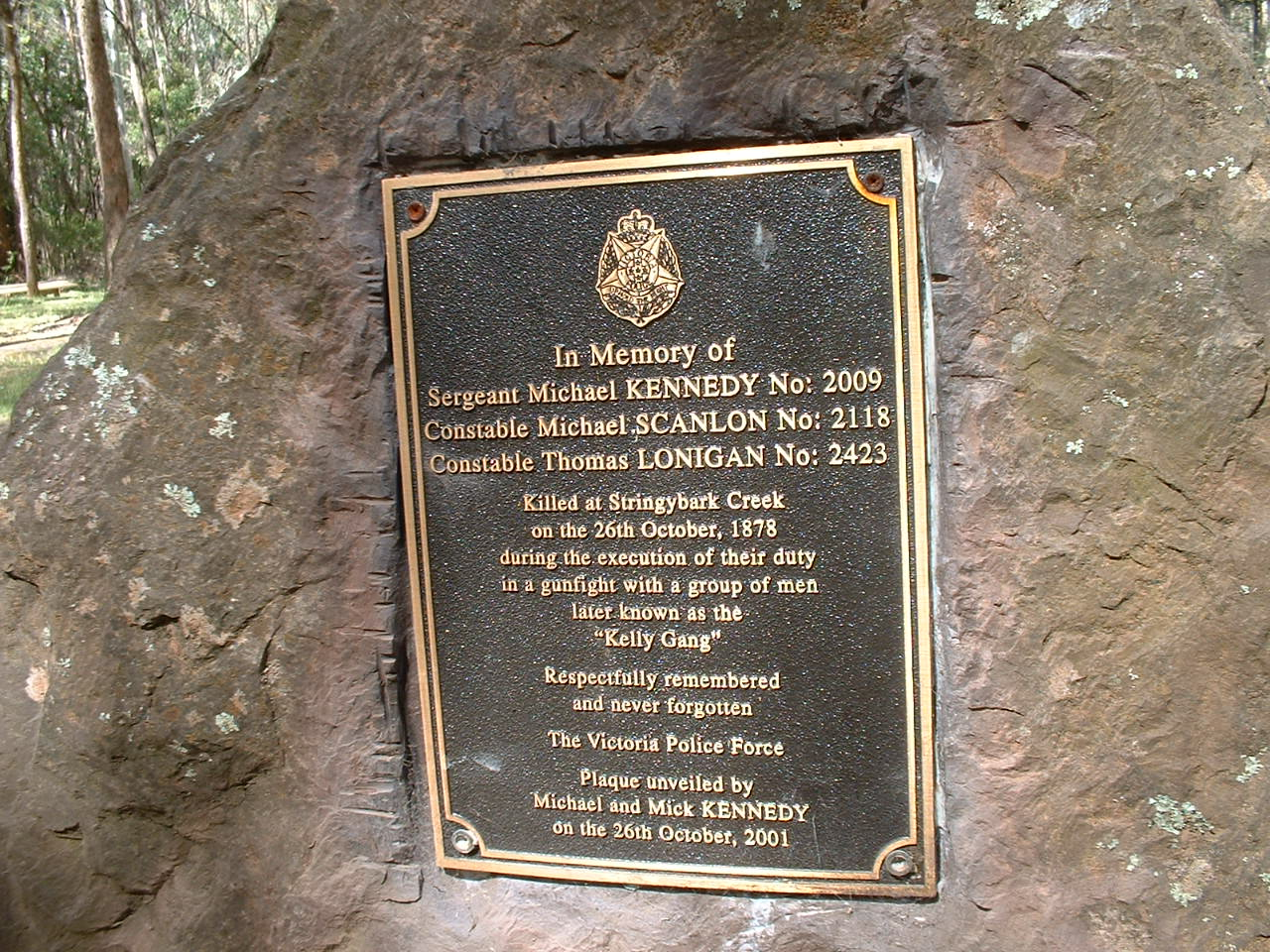
Plaque at Stringybark Creek

Stringybark Creek is a small creek in the Wombat Ranges, Victoria, Australia. It is famous for the place where three policemen were murdered on the 26th of October 1878. The policemen, Sergeant Michael Kennedy, Constable Thomas Lonigan, and Constable Michael Scanlan were searching the forest for the Kelly brothers, Ned and Dan Kelly. They were wanted for the attempted murder of another policeman, Constable Fitzpatrick.

The creek is in the Toombullup State Forest, 50km from Benalla and 36km from Mansfield. The area has been developed for visitors and includes picnic area, camping, toilets and walking tracks. A memorial stone was put in place in 2001. It is near the remains of the hut. A tree near the site of two of the murders (Lonigan and Scanlan), the Police/ Kelly Tree, was scarped by a farmer in the 1930s. He carved the names of the three murdered police into it as a memorial. It has had a small copy of Ned Kelly's helmet attached to it. This caused great upset to the families of the murdered policemen. The other murder site (Kennedy's) is approximately 400–500 metres north west. It is across the Stringybark Creek Road.

== The murders ==
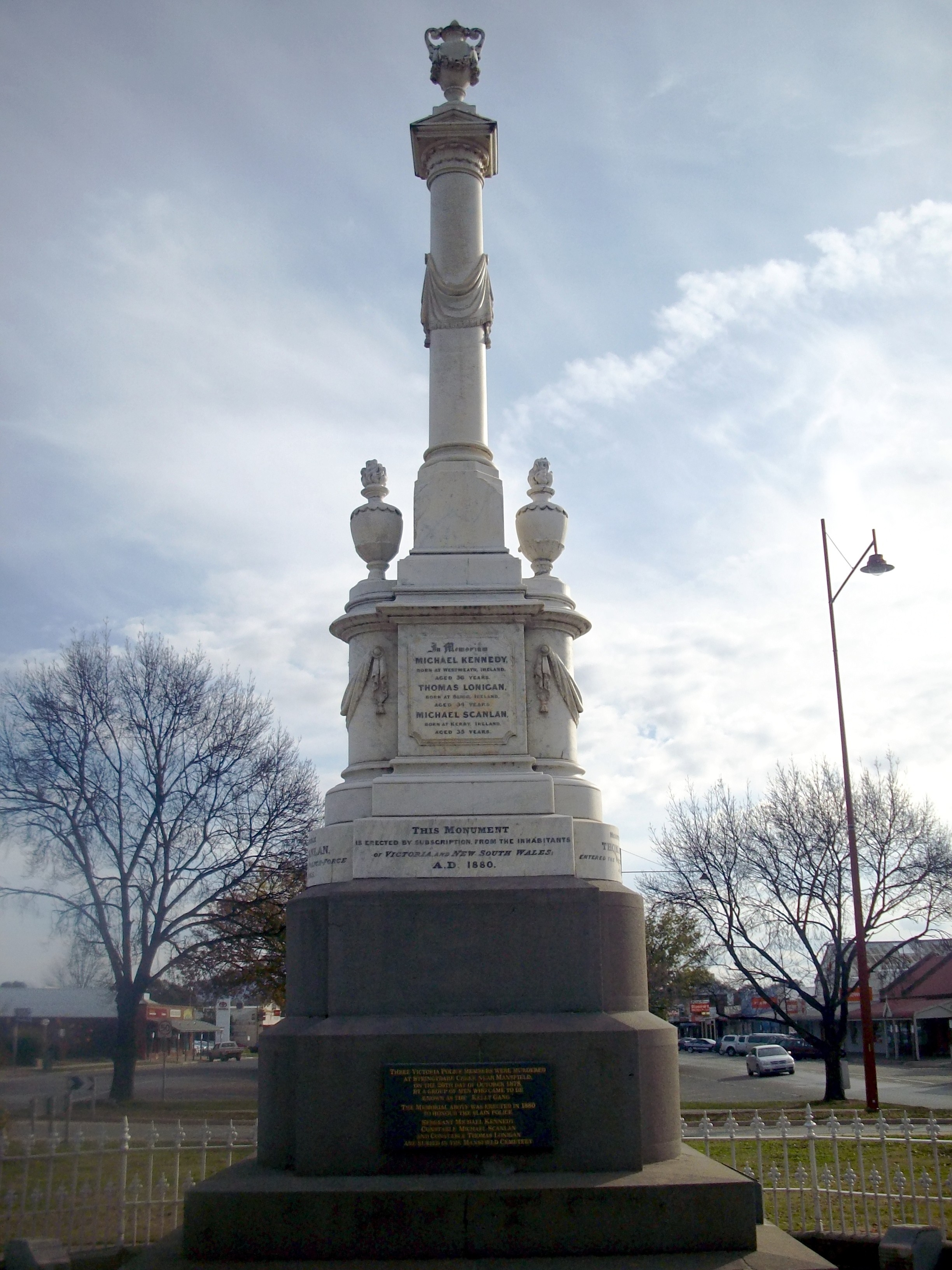
Memorial to the slain policemen, erected in Mansfield in 1880

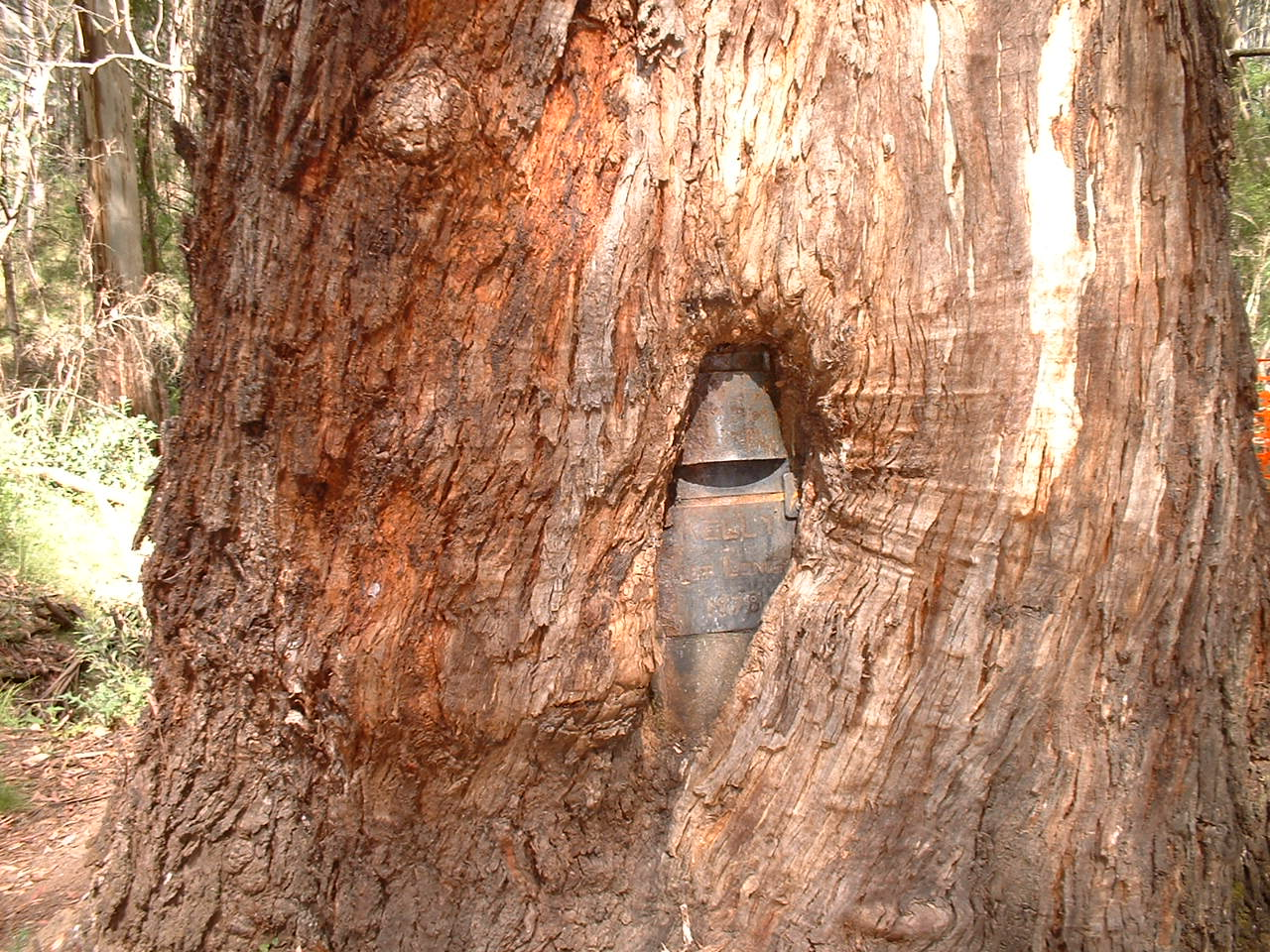
The Kelly Tree

A group of three policemen from Mansfield set out to search for the Kelly brothers who they thought were hiding in the bush near Mansfield. They set up camp at Stringbark Creek on 25 October 1878, not knowing that the Kellys were living in a small hut on Bullock Creek, less than 1km away. The next day Kennedy and Scanlan went to search the nearby forest, while Lonigan and Constable Thomas McIntyre stayed at the campsite. The Kellys heard noises from the police camp and went to investigate. Ned Kelly decided to try and capture the policemen and take their guns, horses and food. He called on the two policemen to give themselves up. McIntyre raised his hands, but Lonigan attempted to run and reached for his gun. Ned Kelly shot him in the eye.

The bushrangers then waited for Kennedy and Scanlan to return. When they rode into the camp, McIntyre warned them that the Kelly brothers were there, and to give themselves up. Scanlan went to unsling his rifle and was shot dead immediately. Kennedy jumped off his horse, and while shooting at the Kellys ran into the bush. Ned and Dan Kelly chased after him, shooting him twice as they hunted him for over 800 yards. Kennedy surrendered. Kelly walked up to him and shot him again in the chest and killed him. During the earlier shooting at Scanlan and Kennedy, McIntrye was able to get onto Kennedy's horse and escaped. He reached Mansfield on the next day to report the deaths.

Ned Kelly, Dan Kelly, Joe Byrne and Steve Hart were made outlaws, and a large reward was offered for their capture, either dead or alive. The three murdered policemen were taken to Mansfield and buried in the cemetery. A large memorial, funded by public donations, was built in the main street of Mansfield.

== In song and poem ==
In 1879, G. Wilson Hall printed a book in Mansfield called The Kelly Gang, Outlaws of the Wombat Ranges. It included a song called "Stringybark Creek" which is believed to have been written by Joe Byrne. It described in verse the story of what had happened. The first verse is:
A sergeant and three constables
Rode Out from Mansfield town,
Near the end of last October
For to hunt the Kellys down.
So they travelled to the Wombat
And they thought it quite a lark,
And they camped upon the borders
Of a creek called Stringbark.

The song has been recorded many times, including the Australian folk-rock band the Bushwackers on their 1979 album, Bushfire.

Waylon Jennings recorded Shel Silverstein's song Lonigan's Widow for the 1970 film Ned Kelly.
