= Steve Hart =

Australian bushranger (1859–1880)

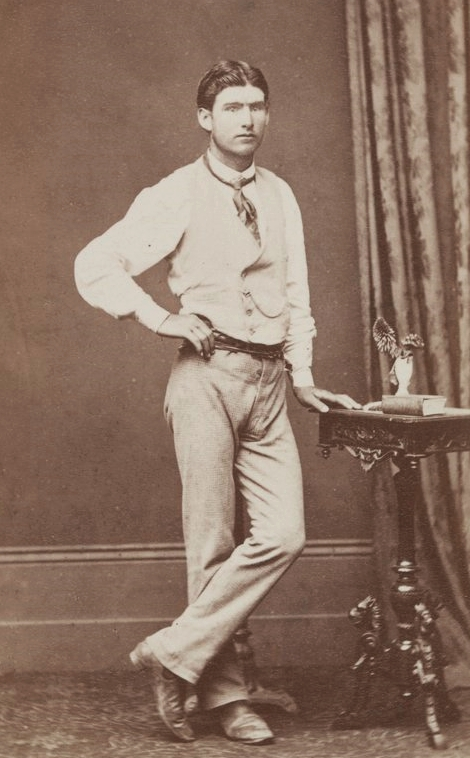
- Born: Stephen Hart; 13 February 1859; Wangaratta, Colony of Victoria
- Died: 28 June 1880 (aged 21); Glenrowan, Victoria, Australia
- Cause of death: Gunshot wound
- Resting place: Greta Cemetery
- Occupation: Bushranger
- Organization: Kelly gang
- Parents: Richard Hart; Bridget Young
- Relatives: Richard Hart Jr.; Hugh Hart; Thomas Hart; Esther "Ettie" Hart; Jane Hart; Winifred Hart; Agnes Hart

Stephen Hart (13 February 1859 – 28 June 1880) was an Australian bushranger, a member of the Kelly gang.

== Biography ==
In 1877, Hart was convicted of horse theft and illegal use of a horse and sentenced to 12 months hard labour in HM Prison Beechworth. When he was released with the usual remission period he promised to work, and he kept his promise—given that he had not specified where he would work. One of the Kelly brothers (most likely Dan, as he and Hart were friends and had likely met in gaol at some point) came to his property and asked him to help them pan for gold. This prompted Hart's most famous quote, "Here's to a short life and a merry one!" as he rode off to Bullock Creek to help the Kelly brothers and their friend Joe Byrne pan for gold.

In 1878 the party of four heard shots being fired and, when they investigated, found a police party camped nearby at Stringybark Creek. The next morning the four killed one of the police party. The other two policemen were out looking for the Kelly brothers as it was not known that Byrne and Hart had joined them. When the two policemen returned to the camp they were ambushed and killed. It is likely that Hart was not armed when the police camp was first held up, but he obtained a firearm afterward. He became an outlaw shortly thereafter, with the rest of the Kelly gang.

Hart took part in the robberies at Euroa and Jerilderie. At Euroa he met an old school friend of his, Francis "Fanny" Shaw (sometimes known as Maggie Shaw) and through her, the police found out the name of the last member of the Kelly gang. Hart also stole a watch from Robert Scott, the bank manager, and when teller Bob Booth asked him for something to remember the visit by, Hart gave him a lead bullet carved with the letter "H". At Jerilderie in 1879 Hart stole a watch from Reverend Gribble, a parson at the Protestant church, and Ned told him to return it, which Hart did, "looking daggers". After Jerilderie, Hart went into hiding with the gang and, for most of 1879, the gang remained shadowy and elusive figures although Hart did appear at a St. Kilda doctor's surgery to be treated for a foot condition.

== Death ==
In 1880 Hart took part in the siege of Glenrowan in which he, Dan Kelly and Joe Byrne were killed. Following Byrne's death from a police bullet during the night, and Ned's capture in the early morning (at roughly 7am) of the 28th, Hart and Dan Kelly found themselves trapped in the hotel and in a hopeless situation. It is believed that the two committed suicide sometime during that afternoon.

Their corpses were then badly burnt, as police (not knowing the two had already died) set the Glenrowan Inn on fire in an attempt to draw the outlaws out of the hotel. Hart's body, little more than a charred stump, was claimed by his brother Dick Hart and buried at Greta Cemetery the following day (29 June) in the same grave as Dan Kelly. He was 21 years old.

It has been rumoured that Dan Kelly and Steve Hart were not buried in Greta Cemetery but somewhere in either the Hart or the Kelly properties. It has also been rumoured that the pair survived the siege of Glenrowan to escape to either America, South Africa or simply to Queensland. The Australian journalist William Bede Melville reported to the London Daily Mail on their deeds of valour alongside British troops in the Boer War.
